= Shocklach Oviatt =

Former civil parish in Cheshire, England

Coordinates: 53.033°N 2.833°W

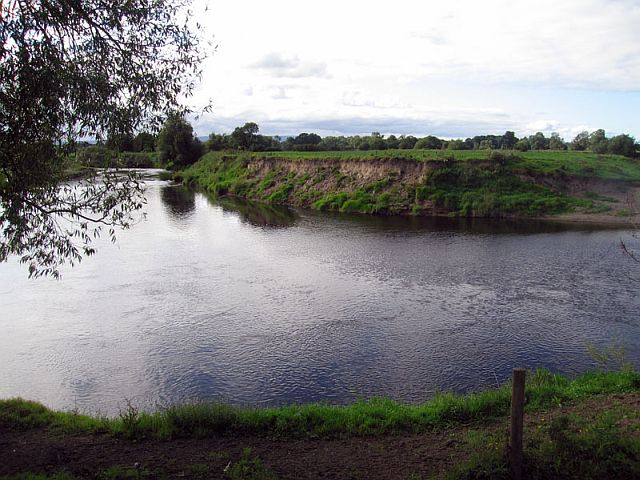
- River Dee Meandering below Dogkennel Farm, Shocklach

- Location within Cheshire
- Population: 78 (2001 census)
- OS grid reference: SJ441488
- Civil parish: Shocklach Oviatt and District
- Unitary authority: Cheshire West and Chester
- Ceremonial county: Cheshire
- Region: North West
- Country: England
- Sovereign state: United Kingdom
- Post town: MALPAS
- Postcode district: SY14
- Dialling code: 01244
- Police: Cheshire
- Fire: Cheshire
- Ambulance: North West
- UK Parliament: Chester South and Eddisbury

Shocklach Oviatt is a former civil parish, now in the parish of Shocklach Oviatt and District, in the unitary authority area of Cheshire West and Chester and the ceremonial county of Cheshire, England. The parish of Shocklach comprised the townships Shocklach Oviatt, Church Shocklach and Caldecott.

Shocklach Oviatt adjoined the border with Wales. Set beside the tributary of the River Dee between Wrexham (16 kilometres away) and Nantwich. The River Dee meanders alongside Shocklach Oviatt and is a major salmon and sea trout fishery; and one in which Shocklach fishery engages. Salmon are most often caught in the sections lying between Shocklach up to Llyn Tegid (Bala Lake).

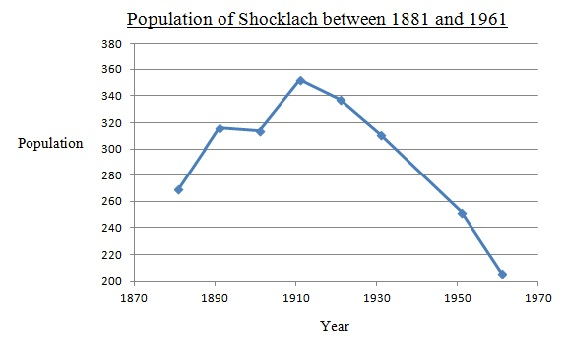
Population of Shocklach between 1881 and 1961

== Demographics ==
In the 1870s, Shocklach was described as being "on River Dee, 4½ miles N W. of Malpas, 2957 ac., pop. 325; the par. contains the townships of Shocklach Church, 1278 ac., pop. 135, and Shocklach Oviatt, 1848 ac., pop. 135".

Shocklach had a population of 290 according to the 2011 census. The total number of houses in Shocklach Oviatt parish from 1881 to 1961.

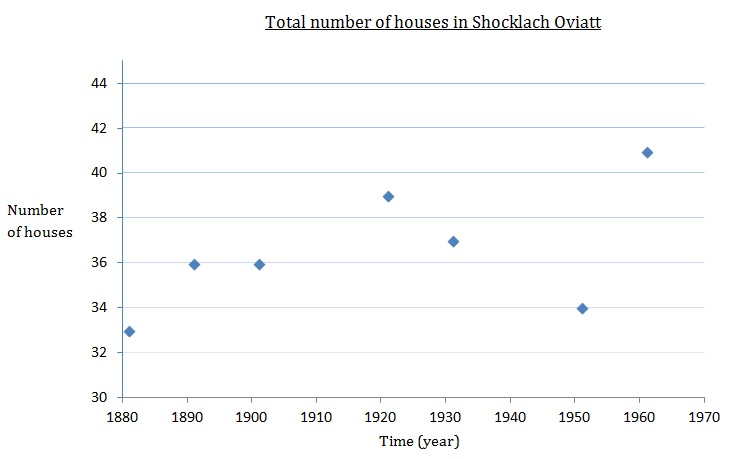
The graph shows the total number of houses in Shocklach Oviatt from 1881 to 1961

== History ==
According to the Concise Oxford Dictionary of English Place Names, the village name Shocklach means 'goblin stream'. The old English (according to the Oxford English Dictionary) for goblin "was scucca and lache which is a variant of letch which means wet ditch or bog or a stream flowing through boggy land; a muddy, ditch or hole". Similarly there is a village named Shobrooke in Devon, and the dictionary compares the original meaning of this name (goblin brook) with that of the village Shocklach.

Occupational structure of Shocklach in 1831

=== Parish history ===
The village of Shocklach has two townships in Wrexham district, Church Shocklach and Shocklach Oviatt, and a parish partly also in Great Boughton district, all in Cheshire. Shocklach Oviatt was a township in Shocklach ancient parish, Broxton hundred, which became a civil parish in 1866. It included the hamlets of Lane End, Little Green and Shocklach Green. On 1 April 2015 the parish was abolished to form Shocklach Oviatt and District.

=== Parish Council ===
Shocklach Oviatt and District Parish Council covers the parishes of Shocklach Oviatt, Shocklach Church, Caldecott and Horton. Public meetings take place every six months in Shocklach Oviatt Primary School.

The graph shows how many people were working in each occupational structure in 1881 in the civil parish Shocklach Oviatt.

== Occupational structure ==
In 1831, the largest occupational category was 'labourers and servants' (70 people), followed by 'employees and professionals' (22 people), 'middling sorts' (20 people) and others (3 people).

== Amenities ==
=== St Edith's Church ===
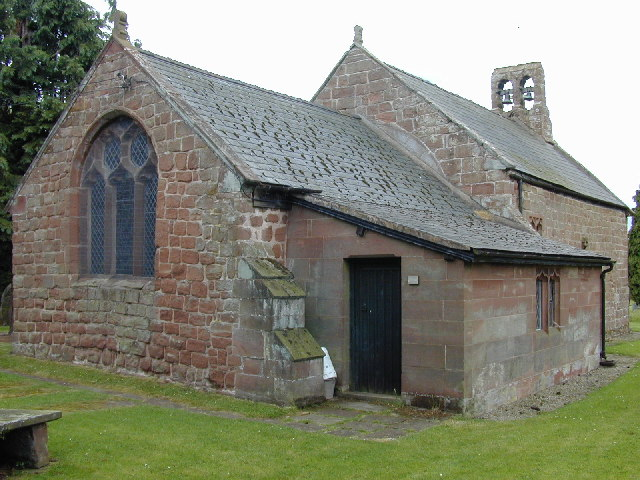
St Edith's Church, Shocklach

In 'The Buildings of England, Cheshire', St Edith's Church is described as "a small Normal building- cf. the very crudely decorated doorway with zigzag, rope, and lozenges broken by ninety degrees. Nave and chancel, and double bellcote... the odd w baptistery squeezed between the two buttresses looks a rustic job".

Today, standing in the middle of fields on its own, overlooking the River Dee and Wales, the 12th-century St Edith's Church is a Grade I listed building, situated one mile outside the village of Shocklach. The church has a beautiful Norman doorway but the level of the ground outside is higher than the base of the door.

=== Shocklach Oviatt CE Primary School ===
Shocklach Oviatt CE Primary School has achieved an International Award for Outstanding Development of the International Dimension. A report (October 2010) states that an Outreach Children's Centre opened inside the primary school on 13 October 2010 which can serve children and families of neighbouring schools and surrounding villages. The aim of the Centre was to support and improve the lives of young children and families from a wide area, also seen as a celebration of rural partnership working.

John Stephens, Director of Children and Young People's Services officially opened the Centre. He said "it has strong support from the whole community who have been involved from the outset, and it provides much needed provision within our rural areas." "The Centre will add to our already thriving community and forge even stronger links between our three schools in the future."

== Biodiversity and the environment ==
Shocklach Oviatt has a range of biodiversity. The 'Shocklach Oak' is "a wonderful tree which has a girth of 6.5 metres and has been recorder with the Woodland Trust in their Ancient Tree Record". The tree is still healthy and continues to grow strong. The Shocklach village website provides a biodiversity survey, recording a diverse range of 138 species of flora (plant life) and 303 species of fauna (animal life).

Shocklach's biodiversity includes having a Site of Biological Importance (SBI), a Site and an Area of Nature Conservation Value(SNCV and ANCV respectively) and lastly a Site of Special Scientific Interest (SSSI). Shocklach churchyard and meadows are a Grade B Site of Biological Importance and a Site of Nature Conservation value.

In 2012, 300 native trees were planted in and around Shocklach. For the Queen's Diamond Jubilee, 50 native oak trees were planted at Shocklach Oviatt Primary School, St Edith's church and also along the approach road to Shocklach.

== See also ==
- Listed buildings in Shocklach Oviatt
