= Stretton Hall =

Stretton Hall may refer to the following structures:

- Stretton Hall, Cheshire
- Stretton Lower Hall, in Cheshire
- Stretton Old Hall, in Cheshire
- Stretton Hall, Leicestershire
- Stretton Hall, Staffordshire
