= Carden, Cheshire =

Village and civil parish in England

Coordinates: 53.070°N 2.806°W

Carden
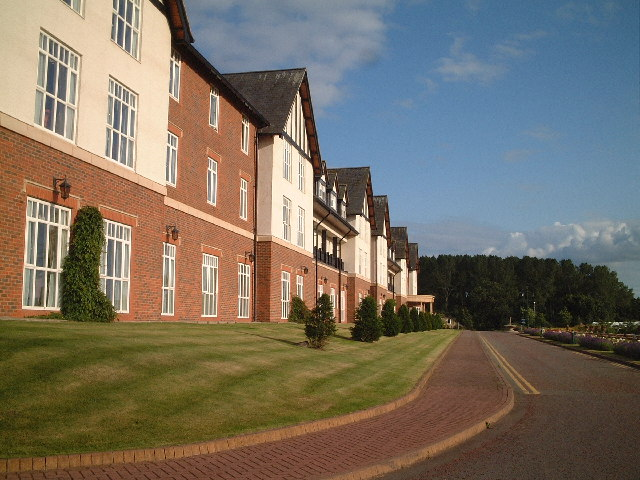
- Carden Park Hotel

- Location within Cheshire
- OS grid reference: SJ460528
- Civil parish: Carden
- Unitary authority: Cheshire West and Chester
- Ceremonial county: Cheshire
- Region: North West
- Country: England
- Sovereign state: United Kingdom
- Post town: CHESTER
- Postcode district: CH3
- Post town: MALPAS
- Postcode district: SY14
- Dialling code: 01829
- Police: Cheshire
- Fire: Cheshire
- Ambulance: North West
- UK Parliament: Chester South and Eddisbury

Carden is a small village and civil parish in the unitary authority of Cheshire West and Chester and the ceremonial county of Cheshire, England. The village of Carden consists of Higher Carden and Lower Carden. The parish includes Carden Hall (or Carden Old Hall) and Lower Carden Hall Because the civil parish is small, it shares a parish council with a number of other small civil parishes, which, in the case of Carden are Aldersey, Barton, Clutton, Coddington, and Stretton under the name of Coddington and District Parish Council. (grid reference SJ462522).

== Toponymy ==
Carden is derived from the Old English word Carrworðign that means 'enclosure at a rock'. The element worðign is relatively common in the region, while the only other local occurrence of carr is in the form Bedestonecarre recorded for Bidston Hill on the Wirral Peninsula in 1303. This type of name is difficult to date. It and could have formed at any time between the seventh century and when it was first recorded as Kauerthin in 1230.

=== Family name ===
Carden (formerly Cawarden) family name; according to Ormerod "at some point before the reign of Henry III (i.e., before 1216) a family assumed the local name Carden." About 1450 a daughter of William de Cawarden married John Leche of Chatsworth, Derbyshire, who thereby acquired Lower Carden Hall and its lands in Cheshire.

== History ==
=== Celtic Carden ===
Artefacts have been found which date back to around 12,800 to 12,000 BC (Upper Palaeolithic period) and were made by the first people to return to Britain at the end of the last glaciation. Nearly 10,000 pieces of chert and flint have been recovered from a site near the village. These include tools (and a great deal of waste material) which conform to the Mesolithic "narrow blade" tradition, and can be dated c 6800–4300 BC. There is evidence of continual Celtic occupation and Bronze Age pottery, dating from about 2200–1800 BC, was found: pots from a Beaker period were found in 1998 and burnt human bone were found.

=== Medieval Carden ===
Carden is not recorded in Domesday Book, as it was probably treated as part of Tilston. In 1066, Tilston had been part of the possessions of Edwin, Earl of Mercia (1065–70), and was evidently already subdivided, as the Bishop claimed half a hide of the manor and, after the Norman Conquest, another half hide was sublet to Ranulf Mainwaring. In 1066, the four hides of taxable arable land paid £6, making it one of the most prosperous Cheshire manors. Eight plough-teams could be accommodated on this land; one was in demesne. The recorded population consisted of four villeins, two bordars, four radmen, a reeve, a smith, a miller and two slaves who shared four plough-teams; the mill was worth eight shillings. The manor is described as being one league long and one wide (about 2.4 by 2.4 km); this is reasonable enough for the east–west measurement, but only acceptable for the north–south dimensions if the township of Horton Green is not included.

The origins of a separate manor of Carden are obscure. The descents of the manors through the Middle Ages are complicated by their division into six parts through the coheiresses Leuca, Margaret and Ellen Caurthyn. By 1419/20 Isabel, daughter and heiress of John Beston and widow of Sir Robert Aston held lands in Carden. Her interests in Carden derived from her paternal grandmother, Isabel, daughter of Cecily, heir of John Codinton, presumed descendant of Leuca and Robert Codinton. Two years later Isabel, now married to Sir John Caryngton, obtained more lands in Carden, Farndon, Cuddington, Clutton and elsewhere from Ralph de Beston.

Richard Caurthyn granted his brother William a quarter of Clutton in a charter attested by Robert Stutevile; this may have been the origin of the division of the manor. William's descendants continued to hold land in Carden throughout the Middle Ages, although the failure of one branch of the male line in the reign of Henry IV (1399–1413) brought the manors into new families. His daughter and coheir Eleanor was married to John Leche III, claimed by some to have been a younger brother of the Leche family of Chatsworth, and the manor of Nether Carden was vested in her.

The Leche family had held property in Carden as early as 1346/07, when Eva Warin released land to John Leche I and his wife Lucy, her sister. Their son, John Leche II, is said to have been surgeon to Edward III and given Castle Warin and other lands in County Kildare. Carden Hall descended through thirteen generations of John Leches (although not always father to son), until a William Leche held the manor at the start of the nineteenth century, after which it descended through another three John Leches.

The earliest mention of Carden Hall can be dated to 1570/01, when an inquisitio post mortem of John Leche VIII (who died 21 June 1569) states that he died "seised of a capital messuage called the Hall of Carthen". The construction of the Hall which survived until 1912 probably took place after this date, during the lordship of John Leche IX or John Leche X. On 12 June 1643, Carden Hall was plundered by a detachment from the Parliamentary garrison of Nantwich and took the owner, John Leche X, away with them as a prisoner.

The most picturesque incident during this period was recorded in a handbill published in 1810, which recorded the life of John Harris, known as 'The English Hermit'. The broadsheet makes a great deal of John Harris's piety, and a recent account claims that he preached in the local villages, which seems unlikely given his decision to retire from the company of other human beings.

The manor of Over Carden passed to a younger branch of the Fittons of Bollin by the marriage of Isabel, daughter of William Caurthyn to Thomas Fitton. It remained in the hands of the Fitton family until after 1662, when Owen Fitton was recorded there. Towards the end of the seventeenth century it was sold to the Bradshaws, both families endowing a charity to support a parochial school at Tilston. It later passed to Joseph Worrell, who disposed of it in several lots and the manor passed to the Leche family of Carden Hall, reuniting the two manors under the name Lower Carden. What is now known as Lower Carden Hall became a farmhouse; it survives as a much-restored seventeenth-century building, although the name, somewhat confusingly, does not refer to the manorial residence as it was the manor house of Over Carden.

=== Modern Carden ===
Since the Hall burnt down in 1912 (allegedly after someone dropped a lit cigarette at a party), the fortunes of the Park have undergone a number of changes of fortune. The Leche family moved to Stretton Hall and the estate was acquired by a leisure company in the 1980s and subsequently developed as a countryside leisure facility including an eighteen-hole golf course, a golf academy, hotel accommodation and a restaurant. It was originally hoped that, had Manchester's bid to host the Olympic Games in the year 2000 been successful, some of the events (such as archery and shooting) would have been held at Carden, attracting considerable sums of money. Following the failure of Manchester's Olympic bid, the company that owned the estate sold it on to St David's Hotels, Ltd. They built a second golf course, designed by Jack Nicklaus, and a much larger hotel and spa facility. As of 1 September 2014, Carden Park Golf Resort and Spa is an independent hotel. More recently a new Carden Hall has been erected on the site of the house burnt down in 1912. Completed in 2004 at a reputed cost in excess of £8m, it is a generic modern interpretation of a classic Georgian design.

== See also ==
- Listed buildings in Carden, Cheshire

== Notes ==
=== Sources ===
- The Carden Project: Outline History
