= Listed buildings in Church Shocklach =

Church Shocklach is a former civil parish, now in the parish of Shocklach Oviatt and District, in Cheshire West and Chester, England. It contains three buildings that are recorded in the National Heritage List for England as designated listed buildings. Of these, one is listed at Grade I, and the other two at Grade II. The parish contains part of the village of Shocklach, and is otherwise rural. The listed buildings consist of a Norman church, a Medieval cross in the churchyard, and a farmhouse that was originally timber-framed.

== Key ==
Grade	Criteria
Grade I	Buildings of exceptional interest, sometimes considered to be internationally important.
Grade II	Buildings of national importance and special interest.

== Buildings ==
Name and location	Photograph	Date	Notes	Grade
St Edith's Church; 53.0459°N 2.8490°W		c. 1150	This is one of the oldest ecclesiastical buildings in Cheshire, and has a Norman doorway. The chancel and chancel arch date from the early 14th century, the ceiling was added in 1813 and the belfry was built in 1815. During a restoration in 1974 a semicircular window was added to the west wall.	I
Medieval cross, St Edith's Churchyard; 53.04568°N 2.84898°W		Medieval	This consists of a red sandstone incised shaft standing on a restored plinth on three steps. The head and part of the shaft are missing. It is a scheduled monument.	II
Parr Green Hall; 53.0400°N 2.8302°W	—	Early 17th century	A farmhouse, basically timber-framed, encased in brick in the early 19th century. It has a slate roof and is in two storeys. The plan consists of a central portion in two bays, with a cross-wing at each end. Inside are two inglenooks.	II

== See also ==
- Listed buildings in Cuddington
- Listed buildings in Farndon
- Listed buildings in Stretton
- Listed buildings in Tilston
- Listed buildings in Malpas
- Listed buildings in Chorlton
