= Listed buildings in Carden, Cheshire =

Carden is a civil parish in Cheshire West and Chester, England. It contains ten buildings that are recorded in the National Heritage List for England as designated listed buildings. The parish is entirely rural, and all the listed buildings are domestic or related to farming.

== Key ==
Grade	Criteria
Grade I	Buildings of exceptional interest, sometimes considered to be internationally important.
Grade II	Buildings of national importance and special interest.

== Buildings ==
Name and location	Photograph	Date	Notes	Grade
Lower Carden Hall; 53.0637°N 2.8030°W	—	15th century or earlier	The hall was later enlarged and otherwise altered. It is basically timber-framed, with plaster panels on a sandstone plinth. The hall is in two storeys, with slate roofs and casement windows. There are large elaborate brick chimneystacks. In about 1984 the hall was restored, with a brick inner skin and steelwork.	I
Building, Bank Farm; 53.0710°N 2.7953°W	—	Mid-17th century	A rectangular timber-framed building that originated as a threshing barn. It was originally thatched, and now has a corrugated iron roof. Weatherboarding has been added to the gables.	II
Keeper's Cottage; 53.0806°N 2.7981°W	—	Mid-17th century	The cottage is timber-framed with brick nogging painted white and slate roofs. The end walls have been replaced with brick painted to resemble timber framing. It is in 1½ storeys with a central gabled dormer containing two windows. Inside the cottage is an inglenook.	II
Carden Green; 53.0713°N 2.7960°W	—	17th century	The cottage is constructed in sandstone and brick on a sandstone plinth, and has a thatched roof covered in corrugated iron. It is a rectangular building in 1½ storeys, with casement windows. Inside is a stone inglenook.	II
Stone House Farmhouse; 53.0637°N 2.8030°W	—	Late 17th century	The farmhouse has been altered and extended in each of the following centuries. It is constructed mainly in sandstone, with some brick, and has slate roofs. The farmhouse is in two storeys with a basement. In the entrance front is a Roman Doric doorcase with attached columns and a pediment.	II
Carden Hall Farmhouse; 53.0807°N 2.8047°W	—	c. 1721	This originated as the stables to Carden Hall. It was altered in 1828 and converted into a farmhouse and farm buildings. The building is constructed in white-painted brick with stone dressings and slate roofs. It has a projecting central gable with a clock. This is surmounted by an oak cupola containing a bell, which has a lead roof and a weathervane.	II
Ice house 53.08046°N 2.80193°W	—	Early 19th century	The ice house is located to the east of Carden Hall Farmhouse. It is constructed in brick under an artificial mound of earth, and consists of a round-domed chamber. It is entered through a barrel vaulted passage containing an angled turn.	II
Carden Bank; 53.0670°N 2.8058°W	—	1828	The house is in painted brick with a slate roof. It is a symmetrical building in two storeys. The central portion has a doorway flanked by a French window on each side. On each side of the central portion is a wing containing a square bay window in the lower storey. All the windows in the upper storey are sashes.	II
Carden Lodge; 53.07041°N 2.80620°W	—	c. 1830	The lodge to the former Carden Hall consists of a sandstone barrel vaulted archway in Ionic style. On each side is a one-bay two-storey wing. On the front of each wing is a sash window, over which is a blank round arch flanked by free-standing columns carrying an entablature. There are double pilasters on each side of the archway and on the corners. Inside the archway is a door leading to the interior of the bays.	II
Bullock's Stone; 53.0730°N 2.7964°W	—	Mid-19th century or earlier	This is a sandstone outcrop that has been shaped. It is trapezoid with a flat top and contains the remnant of an iron tethering ring. It was possibly a drovers' meeting place.	II

== See also ==
- Listed buildings in Clutton
- Listed buildings in Broxton
- Listed buildings in Duckington
- Listed buildings in Tilston
- Listed buildings in Stretton
- Listed buildings in Barton
