= Listed buildings in Clutton, Cheshire =

Known buildings in Clutton, Cheshire

Clutton is a civil parish in Cheshire West and Chester, England. It contains five buildings that are recorded in the National Heritage List for England as designated listed buildings. Of these, three are listed at Grade II*, and two at Grade II. Other than the village of Clutton, the parish is entirely rural. The three Grade II* listed buildings are associated with the entrance to the former Carden Hall (which was in the adjoining Carden parish), and the remaining two Grade II listed buildings are domestic.

== Key ==
Grade	Criteria
II*	Particularly important buildings of more than special interest.
II	Buildings of national importance and special interest.

== Buildings ==
Name and location	Photograph	Date	Notes	Grade
Holford Charity Farmhouse; 53.08521°N 2.80386°W	—	c. 1600	A timber-framed hall and cross-wing, the panels containing painted brick, and a slate roof. An extension, partly in sandstone was added in the 18th century. The farmhouse is in 1½ storeys, and contains casement windows.	II
Clutton Lodge (east); 53.08447°N 2.80533°W		c. 1830	The lodge is constructed in sandstone with a stuccoed brick roof in Baroque style. The roof is in the form of a dome, and carries a terracotta urn. The lodge has a square plan, with concave sides and canted corners. The doorway and window openings are round-headed; the windows are casements.	II*
Clutton Lodge (west); 53.08447°N 2.80564°W		c. 1830	The lodge is constructed in sandstone with a stuccoed brick roof in Baroque style. The roof is in the form of a dome, and carries a terracotta urn. The lodge has a square plan, with concave sides and canted corners. The doorway and window openings are round-headed; the windows are casements.	II*
Gate piers and railings, Clutton Lodge; 53.08443°N 2.80548°W		c. 1830	The gate piers are square and in stone. They are panelled, and topped by a cornice with a tapering finial. The railings are in wrought iron and are ornately decorated.	II*
Rose Cottage; 53.08328°N 2.79706°W	—	Mid-19th century	A cottage in concrete simulating ornate timber framing with a slate roof. It is in 1½ storeys. In the gables are shaped bargeboards, and above the entrance is a gabled dormer.	II

== See also ==
- Listed buildings in Carden
- Listed buildings in Aldersey
- Listed buildings in Chowley
- Listed buildings in Broxton
- Listed buildings in Barton
- Listed buildings in Coddington
