= Listed buildings in Coddington, Cheshire =

Coddington is a civil parish in Cheshire West and Chester, England. It contains seven buildings that are recorded in the National Heritage List for England as designated listed buildings, all of which are at Grade II. This grade is the lowest of the three gradings given to listed buildings and is applied to "buildings of national importance and special interest". The parish is entirely rural. The listed buildings consist of a church with a sundial in the churchyard, the village hall and an adjacent telephone kiosk, a farmhouse, the former rectory, and a former corn mill.

Name and location	Photograph	Date	Notes
Middle Beachin Farmhouse; 53.1041°N 2.8302°W		Early 17th century	Basically a timber-framed building, it was encased in brick probably in the late 18th century, and has a slate roof. The house is in two storeys at the front, and three at the back, and has a double-pile plan. At the right of the house is a projecting wing. Inside is an inglenook.
Coddington Mill and Mill Dam; 53.0896°N 2.8176°W		1775	Built as a corn mill, later converted into a house, retaining the mill machinery. It is in brick with a slate roof, with three storeys. The windows and lintels date from the 20th century. Features include a hoist, loading bays in the upper two storeys, and a dovecote on the ridge. The sluice is in timber and concrete.
Sundial, St Mary's Churchyard; 53.09272°N 2.81821°W		1795	The sundial stands to the south of the church, and has an octagonal stone stem. Its dial is inscribed with the names of the churchwardens and the date.
Old Rectory; 53.0928°N 2.8176°W		1820 (rebuilt)	The rectory, later used as a house, was rebuilt following a fire, and probably contains earlier elements. It is constructed in brick with slate roofs, and has a full-length verandah. The house is pebbledashed, and the verandah is rendered. It has two storeys, and a double-pile plan. The windows are sashes.
St Mary's Church; 53.0928°N 2.8182°W		1833–34	The church replaced an earlier church on the site, and was designed by John Anderson. The west porch was added in 1914. The church is built in sandstone with a slate roof, and consists of a nave, a chancel a west porch, and a north vestry. At the west end is a crenellated bellcote with a short concave spire.
Village Institute; 53.0927°N 2.8189°W		c. 1840	Built as a Sunday school, this is in brick with a slate roof. On the right side is a 20th-century lean-to porch.
Telephone kiosk 53.09264°N 2.81893°W		1935	A K6 type telephone kiosk, designed by Giles Gilbert Scott. It has a square plan, is in cast iron and has a domed top. The top panels contain unperforated crowns.

== See also ==
- Listed buildings in Aldford
- Listed buildings in Aldersey
- Listed buildings in Barton
- Listed buildings in Churton by Aldford
- Listed buildings in Churton by Farndon
- Listed buildings in Clutton
- Listed buildings in Farndon
- Listed buildings in Handley
- Listed buildings in Saighton
