= Listed buildings in Shocklach Oviatt =

Shocklach Oviatt is a former civil parish, now in the parish of Shocklach Oviatt and District, in Cheshire West and Chester, England. It contains three buildings that are recorded in the National Heritage List for England as designated listed buildings, all of which are listed at Grade II. This grade is the lowest of the three gradings given to listed buildings and is applied to "buildings of national importance and special interest". Apart from the village of Shocklach, the parish is entirely rural. The listed buildings consist of two farmhouses and a group of farm buildings.

Name and location	Photograph	Date	Notes
Pursa Farmhouse; 53.0285°N 2.8394°W	—	17th century	The farmhouse is basically timber-framed with brick nogging, the lower storey later encased in brick. It has a slate roof, is in two storeys with attics, and has three sash windows in each storey. At the rear is a single-storey extension under a lean-to roof.
Shocklach Hall; 53.0268°N 2.8484°W	—	1850s	A brick farmhouse with slate roofs. It is a substantial building, in two storeys and an attic, which formed part of a model farm. It has a symmetrical front, incorporating a doorway with a rectangular fanlight. On the sides are gables with bargeboards, each with an attic window containing a casement. The other windows are sashes with wedge lintels.
Farm buildings, Shocklach Hall; 53.0264°N 2.8487°W	—	1850s	The farm buildings are arranged symmetrically around three sides of a courtyard. They are in brick with hipped slate roofs, and incorporate shippons, stables, a barn and a cartshed. Features include a semicircular arched recess, circular pitch holes, and ventilators in the form of double crosses. In the centre of the yard is an oval pool surrounded by raised kerbs.
