= Listed buildings in Barton, Cheshire =

Barton is a civil parish in Cheshire West and Chester, England. It contains nine buildings that are recorded in the National Heritage List for England as designated listed buildings, all of which are at Grade II. This grade is the lowest of the three gradings given to listed buildings and is applied to "buildings of national importance and special interest". Other than the settlement of Barton, the parish is rural. Most of the listed buildings are domestic or related to farming, apart from a public house, the stocks, and a well.

| Name and location | Photograph | Date | Notes |
|---|---|---|---|
| Barton Farmhouse; 53.0829°N 2.8253°W | | 17th century or earlier | It is basically timber-framed, and was encased in brick in the late 18th century. It has a slate roof, and is in two storeys with attics. There is a gabled porch, and the windows are casements. |
| Millhey Farmhouse; 53.0823°N 2.8257°W | | Early 17th century (probable) | The farmhouse was later altered. The 18th or 19th-century main wing is in brick painted to resemble timber framing and has 1½ storeys. The earlier cross wing is timber-framed, and also in 1½ storeys. There is also a small 19th-century single-storey right wing. The windows are casements. |
| Cock of Barton Inn; 53.0817°N 2.8255°W | | 17th century | The inn was later extended to the rear. The front is timber-framed on a sandstone plinth, the left end is in sandstone, and the right end and rear are in brick. The roof is slated. The building consists of a two-storey main wing and cross-wing, and a right wing with a single storey and an attic. There is a massive sandstone chimney on the cross-wing, and two ornate chimneys on the gables of the main wing. |
| Rose Farm; 53.0827°N 2.8231°W | | 17th century | Originating as a farmhouse, this has been converted into a cottage. It is basically timber-framed with brick and plaster infill, and has been partly rebuilt in brick. It has a slate roof. The building is in two storeys, and has a small two-storey rear wing. Inside is a pair of sandstone inglenooks with oak bressumers. |
| Stocks; 53.08162°N 2.82661°W | | 17th century (probable) | The stocks have subsequently been restored. They consist of rectangular stone uprights with semicircular tops, containing grooves for the boards. The seat is a single block of stone. |
| Farm building 53.0816°N 2.8259°W | | Late 17th century | Partly rebuilt in the 19th century, the cottage originated as a farm building. It is timber-framed, and has brick gable ends, and a slate roof. Its features include a loading door in the upper storey, and a gabled half-dormer. |
| Rock Farmhouse; 53.0822°N 2.8252°W | | Late 18th century (probable) | Constructed in brick with slate roofs, the farmhouse has an L-shaped plan. Both the main wing and the cross-wing contain casement windows, and half-dormers. |
| Well; 53.08265°N 2.8196°W | — | 1782 (?) | The well consists of a shelter with two troughs and a water spout. The shelter is in stone, and the troughs are each cut from a single piece of sandstone. An iron spout feeds the trough to the west. |
| Higher Farmhouse; 53.0829°N 2.8258°W | | Early 19th century | The farmhouse is constructed in brick with a slate roof. It is in two storeys, and has a symmetrical front. Above the door is a fanlight, and the windows are sashes. |

== See also ==
- Listed buildings in Carden
- Listed buildings in Clutton
- Listed buildings in Coddington
- Listed buildings in Farndon
- Listed buildings in Stretton
