= Listed buildings in Duckington =

Duckington is a civil parish in Cheshire West and Chester, England. It contains three buildings that are recorded in the National Heritage List for England as designated listed buildings, all of which are at Grade II. This grade is the lowest of the three gradings given to listed buildings and is applied to "buildings of national importance and special interest". Apart from the village of Duckington, the parish is entirely rural. All the listed buildings are structures associated with Bank Farm.

Name and location	Photograph	Date	Notes
Cart house, Bank Farm; 53.0601°N 2.7625°W	—	c. 1730	The cart house was later used as a shippon. It is constructed in brick and stone, with stone dressings, and a pantile roof.
Shippons, Bank Farm; 53.0601°N 2.7621°W	—	c. 1730	This is a long range of farm buildings with shippons below and hay lofts above. It is constructed in brick and stone, with stone dressings, and a pantile roof.
Barn, Bank Farm; 53.0598°N 2.7623°W	—	Early 19th century	A barn in the style of the 1730s. It is constructed in brick with stone dressings, and has a pantile roof.

== See also ==
- Listed buildings in Carden
- Listed buildings in Larkton
- Listed buildings in Tilston
- Listed buildings in Bickerton
- Listed buildings in Broxton
