= St Edith's Church, Shocklach =

Coordinates: 53.0459°N 2.8490°W

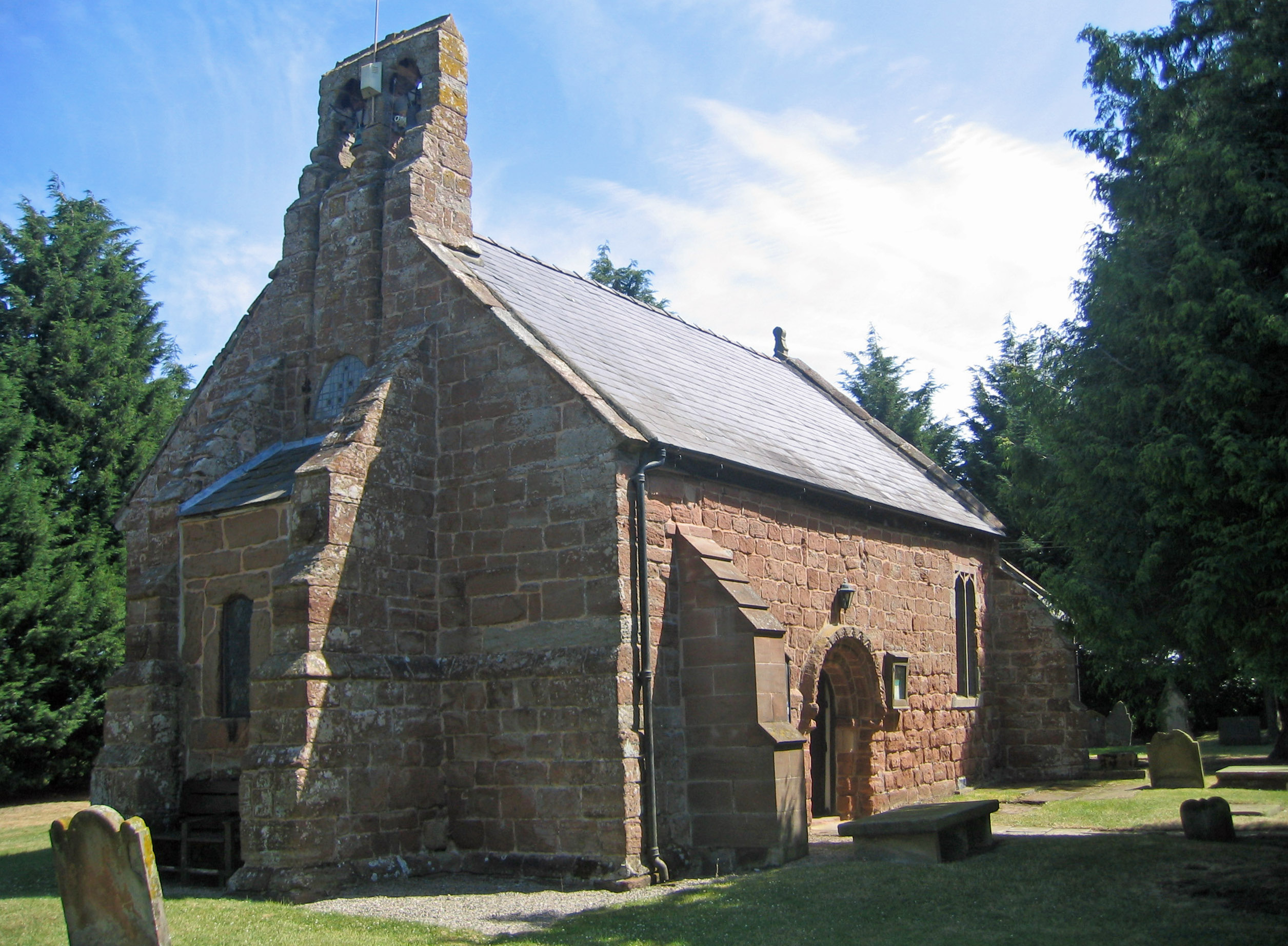
- St Edith's Church, Shocklach, from the southwest

- Location in Cheshire
- OS grid reference: SJ 431 502
- Location: Shocklach, Cheshire
- Country: England
- Denomination: Anglican
- Website: St Edith, Shocklach

History
- Status: Parish church
- Dedication: St Edith

Architecture
- Functional status: Active
- Architectural type: Church
- Style: Norman
- Groundbreaking: c. 1150
- Completed: 1926

Specifications
- Materials: Red sandstone, slate roof

Administration
- Province: York
- Diocese: Chester
- Archdeaconry: Chester
- Deanery: Malpas
- Parish: Shocklach

Clergy
- Vicar: Rev Jane Stephenson

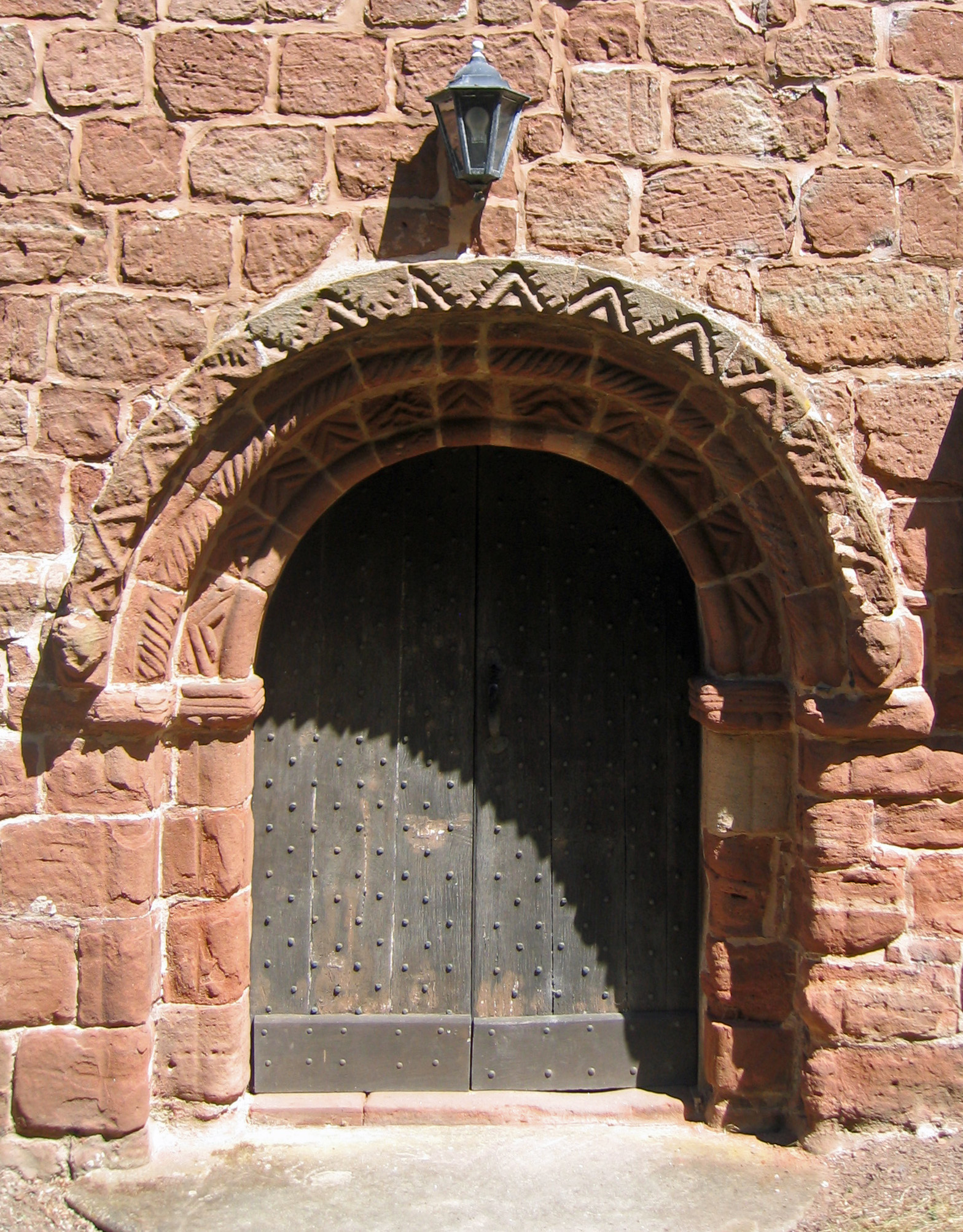
Norman doorway

St Edith's Church, Shocklach, stands at the end of an isolated lane running toward the River Dee about 1 mile (2 km) to the north of the village of Shocklach, Cheshire, England. It is a small Norman church, and is one of the oldest ecclesiastical buildings in Cheshire. The church is recorded in the National Heritage List for England as a designated Grade I listed building and its simple Norman work is considered to be unique in Cheshire. It is an active Anglican parish church in the diocese of Chester, the archdeaconry of Chester and the deanery of Malpas. Its benefice is combined with that of St Mary, Tilston.

== History ==
The church was built probably about 1150 by Thomas de Shocklach. As the church is dedicated to Saint Edith of Wilton, an Anglo-Saxon saint, it is thought that an earlier church may have stood on the site. The chancel and chancel arch date from the early 14th century. In the 17th century the west wall of the nave was restored and altered to provide a small baptistry between two buttresses. The ceiling was added in 1813 and the belfry was built in 1815. Victorian restoration was carried out in 1878 when a new wooden floor was inserted, raising its level by some 12 inches (30 cm) to 18 inches (46 cm). The churchyard was extended in 1905, and again in 1922. In 1926 the vestry was rebuilt to the north of the chancel. During a restoration in 1974 a semicircular window was added to the west wall. To celebrate the 2000 Millennium, a new stained glass window designed by the pupils of Shocklach Primary School was installed in the north wall of the nave.

== Architecture ==
=== Exterior ===
St Edith's is constructed in blocks of red sandstone with a grey slate roof. Its plan is simple and consists of a nave with a small baptistry at the west end, and a chancel with a vestry to its north. On the south side is a Norman doorway in fine condition. It has a round arch of three orders, the outer and inner ones being decorated with chevrons, the middle one with cables. It rests on square piers with weathered corbel heads. Raymond Richards considered the doorway to be one of the best Norman examples in the county. The door is of oak with iron studs. A north door has been blocked and converted into a window. The east window has three lights and contains simple tracery. It is thought that this may have been moved from another church or re-fitted because its top has been truncated. At the west end of the church is a simple open bellcote containing two bells, and on the gable at the east end is a cross finial. On the outside of the north wall is a weathered carving. It is not known what this represents, but "it is typical of restoration after the Civil War".

=== Interior ===
The nave has a curved plaster ceiling with plaster rosettes. The round chancel arch is medieval. The chancel has an arch-braced wooden roof. The pews are dated 1697, the altar rails are from the late 18th century and the two sanctuary chairs are also early. The font is unusual in that it has seven sides. The communion rail is from the 18th century. The oak pulpit is plain and is dated 1687 with brass nails. On the west wall of the nave are the royal arms of George III dated 1760 and a hatchment to the Purleston family. A pane of glass, formerly from the east window is preserved in a frame to the left of the organ. On it is scratched "I, Robert Aldersey, was here on 1st day of October 1756 along with John Massie and Mr Derbyshire. The roads were so bad that we were in danger of our lives". The parish registers date from 1538 and the churchwardens' accounts from 1725.

Incorporated into the north wall at its west end is a carved stone, measuring about 12 inches (30 cm) square. It is weathered but shows the figure of a person on horseback. The date of the carving and what is depicted has been a subject of speculation. The parish leaflet states it "seems to show a military figure on horseback", although it has been suggested that it shows the Flight into Egypt. The citation in the grading citation identifies it as a "mounted knight" and dates it possibly to the 17th century. A very different but possible explanation has been given by Dan Robinson, curator of the Grosvenor Museum, Chester. He notes that the carving depicts a single rider on a single horse, but that the horse appears to have more than four legs, possibly depicting Sleipnir, the eight-legged mount of Odin. If so, the carving would be of Viking origin.

== External features ==
In the churchyard is part of a medieval red sandstone cross. The square base has four steps and on it rests an octagonal shaft which was replaced or recut in 1896. The head of the cross is missing. It is a Grade II listed building, and a scheduled monument. The churchyard also contains the war grave of a Royal Field Artillery soldier of World War I. The hay meadows belonging to the church are a Site of Biological Importance. Outside the churchyard is a restored stable dating from about 1700.

== See also ==
- Grade I listed buildings in Cheshire West and Chester
- Grade I listed churches in Cheshire
- Norman architecture in Cheshire
- Listed buildings in Church Shocklach
