= Horton-by-Malpas =

Former civil parish in Cheshire, England

Coordinates: 53.041°N 2.815°W

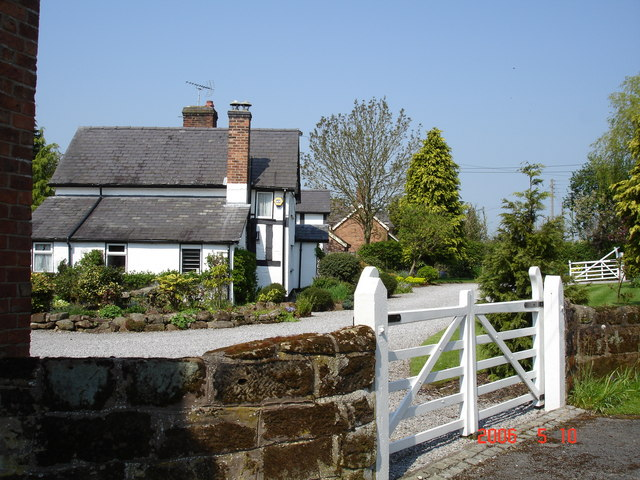
- The Grange

- Location within Cheshire
- Population: 62 (2001)
- OS grid reference: SJ4549
- Civil parish: Shocklach Oviatt and District
- Unitary authority: Cheshire West and Chester
- Ceremonial county: Cheshire
- Region: North West
- Country: England
- Sovereign state: United Kingdom
- Post town: MALPAS
- Postcode district: SY14
- Dialling code: 01829
- Police: Cheshire
- Fire: Cheshire
- Ambulance: North West
- UK Parliament: Chester South and Eddisbury

Horton-by-Malpas is a former civil parish, now in the parish of Shocklach Oviatt and District, in the borough of Cheshire West and Chester and ceremonial county of Cheshire in England. In 2001 it had a population of 62. The parish included the hamlet of Horton Green.

== History ==
The name Horton derives from Old English horu 'dirt' and tūn 'settlement, farm, estate', presumably meaning 'farm on muddy soil'.

Horton was formerly a township in the parish of Tilston, in 1866 Horton became a separate civil parish. From 1974 to 2009 it was in Chester district. On 1 April 2015 the parish was abolished to form Shocklach Oviatt and District.

Horton Grange was built in 1629 and subsequently altered. It is timber-framed with brick nogging, and partly rebuilt in brick, with slate roofs. It is in two storeys, and consists of a main wing and two cross-wings. The building is Grade II listed.

== Horton Green ==
The small hamlet of Horton Green lay within the parish. The hamlet is recorded as "Horton Green" in 1831, but had been known as "Horton" as early as 1240.
