= Stretton, Cheshire West and Chester =

Hamlet in Cheshire, England

Coordinates: 53.069°N 2.825°W

Stretton
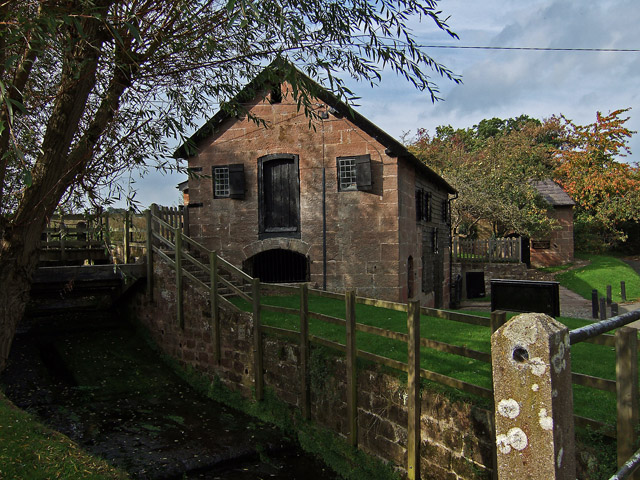
- Stretton Watermill

- Location within Cheshire
- Population: 123 (2011 census) (Barton & Stretton)
- OS grid reference: SJ447528
- Civil parish: Stretton
- Unitary authority: Cheshire West and Chester
- Ceremonial county: Cheshire
- Region: North West
- Country: England
- Sovereign state: United Kingdom
- Post town: MALPAS
- Postcode district: SY14
- Dialling code: 01606
- Police: Cheshire
- Fire: Cheshire
- Ambulance: North West
- UK Parliament: Chester South and Eddisbury

Stretton is a hamlet and civil parish in the unitary authority of Cheshire West and Chester and the ceremonial county of Cheshire, England. The small, rural parish also includes the hamlet of Wetreins Green (pronounced Wetrens or Wet-er-ans). It is near the Welsh border, approximately thirteen miles south of Chester and about eight miles east of Wrexham in Wales.

Notable landmarks within the parish are Stretton Hall, Stretton Lower Hall, Stretton Old Hall, and also the working museum Stretton Watermill.

Stretton means "settlement on a Roman road", derived from the Old English strǣt and tūn. In this case the road was the Via Devana, which ran between Whitchurch in Shropshire and Chester.

Stretton was a township in Tilston parish of Broxton Hundred, which became a civil parish in 1866. The population was recorded as 84 in 1801, then 71 in 1851, 119 in 1901 and 104 in 1951. In 2001 the village population had fallen to 51. According to the 2001 census, the civil parish was combined with neighbouring Barton civil parish and the figure was given as 122. In the 2011 census Barton and Stretton were again combined. The population had increased by one to 123.

== See also ==
- Listed buildings in Stretton, Cheshire West and Chester
