= Church Shocklach =

Former civil parish in Cheshire, England

Coordinates: 53.046°N 2.858°W

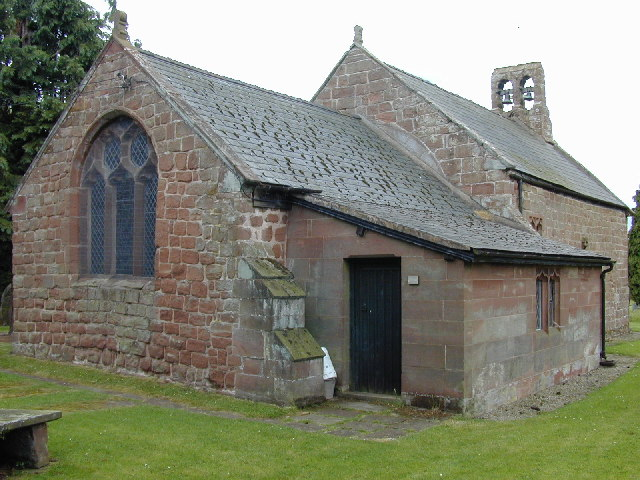
- St Edith's Church

- Location within Cheshire
- Population: 290 (2011)
- OS grid reference: SJ4250
- Civil parish: Shocklach Oviatt and District
- Unitary authority: Cheshire West and Chester
- Ceremonial county: Cheshire
- Region: North West
- Country: England
- Sovereign state: United Kingdom
- Post town: MALPAS
- Postcode district: SY14
- Dialling code: 01829
- Police: Cheshire
- Fire: Cheshire
- Ambulance: North West
- UK Parliament: Chester South and Eddisbury

Church Shocklach is a former civil parish, now in the parish of Shocklach Oviatt and District, in the borough of Cheshire West and Chester and ceremonial county of Cheshire in England. In 2001 it had a population of 113, increasing to 290 at the 2011 Census. The parish included most of the village of Shocklach. Church Shocklach was formerly a township, in 1866 Church Shocklach became a civil parish, on 1 April 2015 the parish was abolished to form Shocklach Oviatt and District.

== See also ==
- Listed buildings in Church Shocklach
