= Castletown, Cheshire =

Deserted village in Cheshire, England

Coordinates: 53°03′15″N 2°50′19″W

Castletown in the civil parish of Shocklach Oviatt and District, in Cheshire, England, is a deserted village located at SJ43885110 whose sole remains are earthworks. The site is a Scheduled Ancient Monument. The Bishop Bennet Way passes the site.

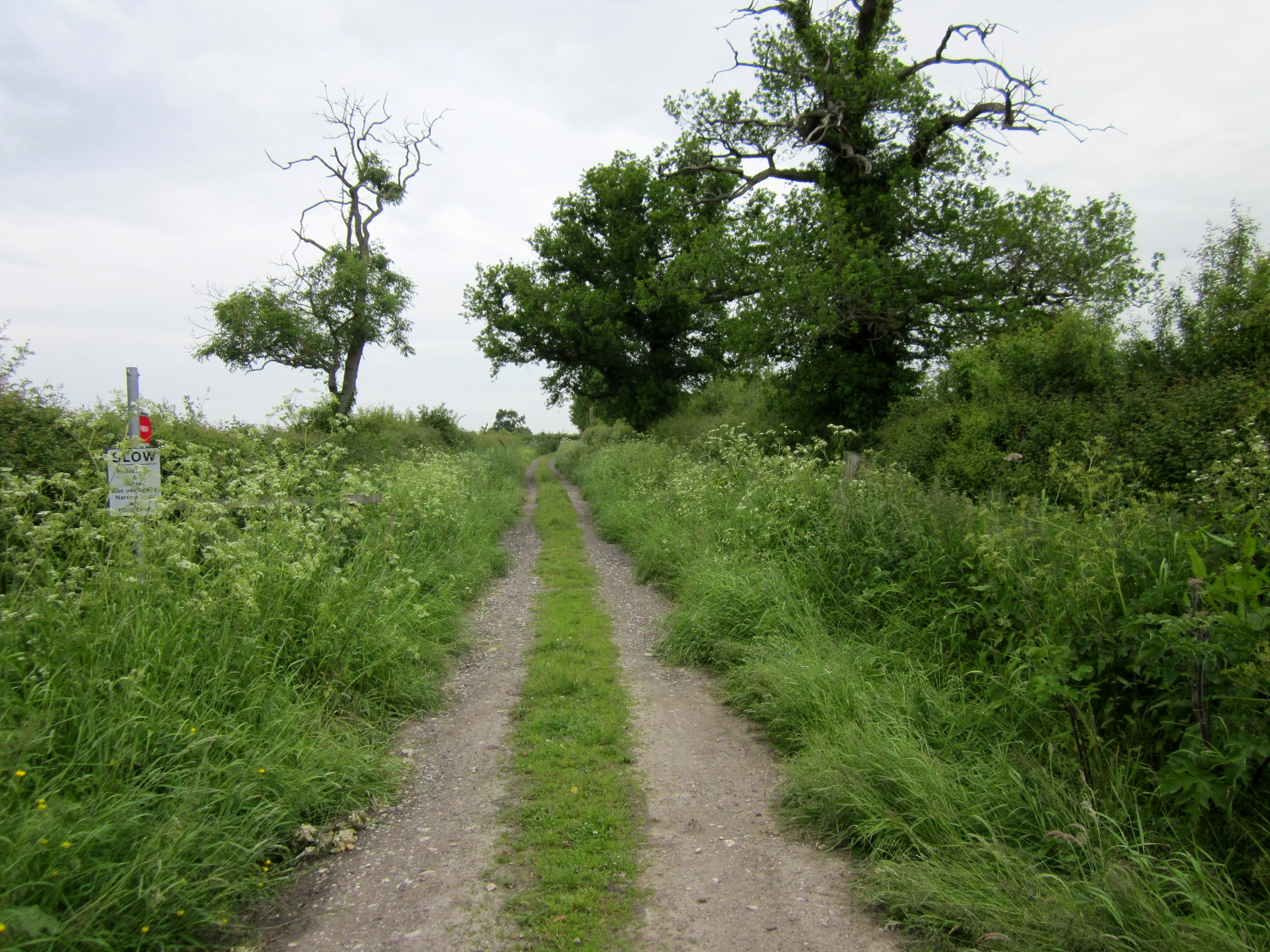
Bishop Bennet Way at Castletown
