= Clutton, Cheshire =

Village in Cheshire, England

Coordinates: 53.085°N 2.800°W

Clutton
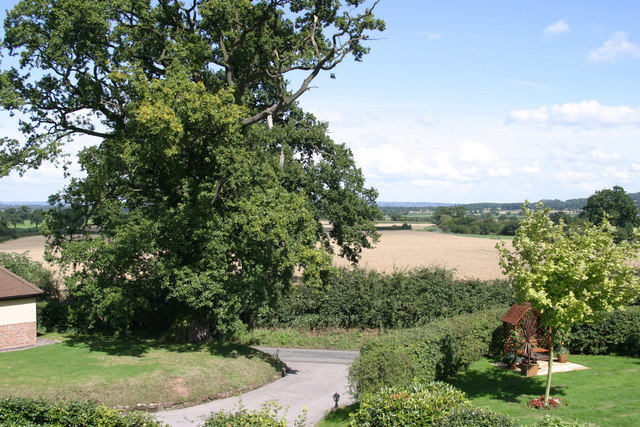
- High Cross Lane, Clutton

- Location within Cheshire
- Area: 2.387 sq mi (6.18 km^{2})
- Population: 371 (2011 census) (Clutton & Carden)
  - Density: 155/sq mi (60/km^{2})
- OS grid reference: SJ4642054344
- Civil parish: Clutton
- Unitary authority: Cheshire West and Chester
- Ceremonial county: Cheshire
- Region: North West
- Country: England
- Sovereign state: United Kingdom
- Post town: CHESTER
- Postcode district: CH3
- Dialling code: 01829
- UK Parliament: Chester South and Eddisbury

Clutton is a village and civil parish in the unitary authority of Cheshire West and Chester and the ceremonial county of Cheshire, England. It lies nine miles from Wrexham and 11 miles from Chester. It had a population of 371 according to the 2011 census.

It has a Church of England primary school.

== History ==
The name "Clutton" means 'rocky-hill farm'. It is derived from the Old English clūd (rocky hill) and tūn (farmstead or settlement). The village is also principally where the surname of Clutton originated from.

Clutton was mentioned in the Domesday Book in 1086 as Clutone, under the ownership of William fitz Nigel. It was recorded to have to four households: three were villagers and one was a Frenchman. In 1066 the landowners had been Edward of Grappenhall and Wulfwin Chit, with the value of the land being £1. By 1086 this was 8 shillings (£0.4) for two ploughlands.

In the 1870s, Clutton was described as "a township in Farndon parish, Cheshire; 5½ miles N of Malpas. Acres, 609. Real property, £947. Pop., 74. Houses, 12. Williamson, the antiquary, was a native."

Approximately 1.1 km north east of Clutton is a spring named Holy Well, situated at the settlement Holywell. It is said that the spring arose after the body of Saint Winifred was laid there on the way to Shrewsbury Abbey. This spring today now provides the drinking water for two houses.

Although the village itself does not have a church, the church that has traditionally served the village is St Chad's Church in Farndon, approximately 5 km to the west of Clutton. Although first recorded in the Domesday Book in 1086, it is likely that there were buildings as far back as Celtic times.

Clutton

Climate chart (precipitation, max. and min. temperature)
J	F	M	A	M	J	J	A	S	O	N	D
63 7 3	40 9 2	37 11 3	48 12 4	49 17 7	60 17 10	48 21 12	48 19 12	50 18 9	71 14 7	57 11 4	63 8 2
- █ Average max. and min. temperatures in °C
- █ Precipitation totals in mm
Imperial conversion
J	F	M	A	M	J	J	A	S	O	N	D
2.5 45 37	1.6 48 36	1.5 52 37	1.9 54 39	1.9 63 45	2.4 63 50	1.9 70 54	1.9 66 54	2 64 48	2.8 57 45	2.2 52 39	2.5 46 36
- █ Average max. and min. temperatures in °F
- █ Precipitation totals in inches

== Geography ==
Clutton is situated 253 km north west of London and 13.5 km south of Chester. The nearest train stations can be found in Wrexham or Chester. The nearest airport is Liverpool John Lennon Airport, 33 miles away. The village is 60 metres above sea level.

=== Geology ===
Clutton sits on sandstone formed approximately 206 to 248 million years ago during the Triassic period. The bed rock also contains sand and gravel formed by river channels. During the Triassic period the sea level was higher than current levels and parts of Cheshire were submerged by seawater. This left salt deposits across Cheshire. The geology was more recently by glacial deposition up to 2 million years ago. These glacial deposits were made up of sand and gravel.

=== Climate ===
Clutton's location means that it has a temperate climate. Average temperatures range from an average maximum of 21 °C to an average minimum of 2 °C.

== Demography ==
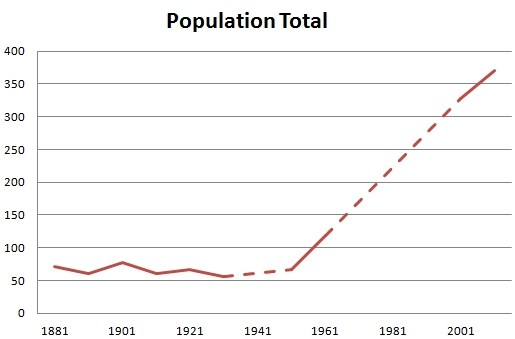
Clutton population time series 1881–2011

=== Population ===
Up until the 1950s, the population of Clutton remained under 100 people (72 in 1801, 89 in 1851, 78 in 1901 and 67 in 1951). By 2001 the village had a population of 259. According to the 2001 census, the civil parish was combined with neighbouring Carden civil parish and the figure was given as 328, with the combined figure increasing further to 371 in the 2011 census. The population of Clutton has expanded the most in the past few decades which coincided with the counter-urbanisation movement of the population in the UK.

Occupations of the population of Clutton in 1881

=== Occupation history ===
Until recent years the main industry in Clutton was agriculture. In the 2011 census the main occupation is listed as Professional Occupations. As parts of Cheshire were submerged by seawater during the Triassic period, it is likely that the workers classified as "Workers in various mineral substances" were employed to work in salt mines.

== See also ==
- Listed buildings in Clutton, Cheshire
