= Tilston =

Village and civil parish in England

Coordinates: 53.0562°N 2.80616°W

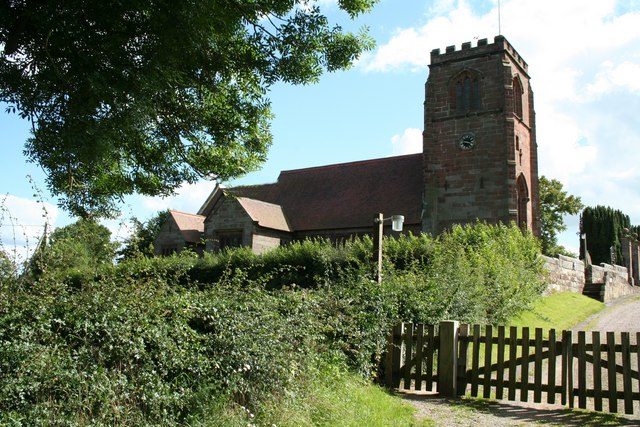
- St. Mary's Church, Tilston

- Location within Cheshire
- Population: 603 (2011 Census)
- OS grid reference: SJ4526250649
- Civil parish: Tilston
- Unitary authority: Cheshire West and Chester
- Ceremonial county: Cheshire
- Region: North West
- Country: England
- Sovereign state: United Kingdom
- Post town: MALPAS
- Postcode district: SY14
- Dialling code: 01829
- Police: Cheshire
- Fire: Cheshire
- Ambulance: North West
- UK Parliament: Chester South and Eddisbury

Tilston is a village and a civil parish in the unitary authority of Cheshire West and Chester and the county of Cheshire, England. It is located near the larger towns of Chester to the north, Wrexham to the west and Whitchurch to the south. At the 2001 Census, the population was recorded as 627, reducing to 603 at the 2011 census. Tilston is home to a primary school of approximately 100 students.

== Buildings ==
The parish is home to a number of notable buildings and structures including St Mary's Church, a Grade II* listed building. A War Memorial Hall was opened in 1976, commemorating ten parishioners lost in World War I and six in World War II.

== History ==
=== Roman history ===
Tilston stands on the site of the Roman town of Bovium, which was a staging post on the Roman road (similar to Watling Street) between the larger settlements at Deva Victrix (modern-day Chester) and Viroconium (now Wroxeter).

=== Middle Ages ===
In 1066 after the Battle of Hastings the area of present-day Tilston was taken by the Normans from the Anglo-Saxons. Initially Gerbod the Fleming and a few years later Hugh Lupus, thought to be a nephew of King William I (William the Conqueror), were given extensive areas of Cheshire by the King, to assume the titles of 1st and 2nd Earl of Chester respectively.

Lupus gave control of parts of his earldom to his supporters, with the Manor of Tilston assigned to the Norman knight Sir Eynion, who assumed the title Eynion de Tilston and passed title and manor on to his descendants. The 'Tilston lords' lived in a castle on the manor thought to be close to the current village of Shocklach, eventually losing their status during the demise of feudalism in England.

Since the Middle Ages, Tilston's history has been closely linked with that of neighboring Carden including through the activities and buildings of the Carden Estate.

=== Welsh Marches ===
The village is located in the Welsh Marches, the area along the English border with Wales. In the 12th century, Wales was not part of the Kingdom of England and the Welsh conducted frequent raids across the border into Tilston and other English 'Marcher' areas, until Wales was conquered in the late 13th Century by King Edward I ('Longshanks').

== See also ==
- Listed buildings in Tilston

== External sources ==
- Tilston Parish Council's website
- Early History of the Tillotson Family in England
- Tilson Genealogy
- Tillotson
