= Stretton Watermill =

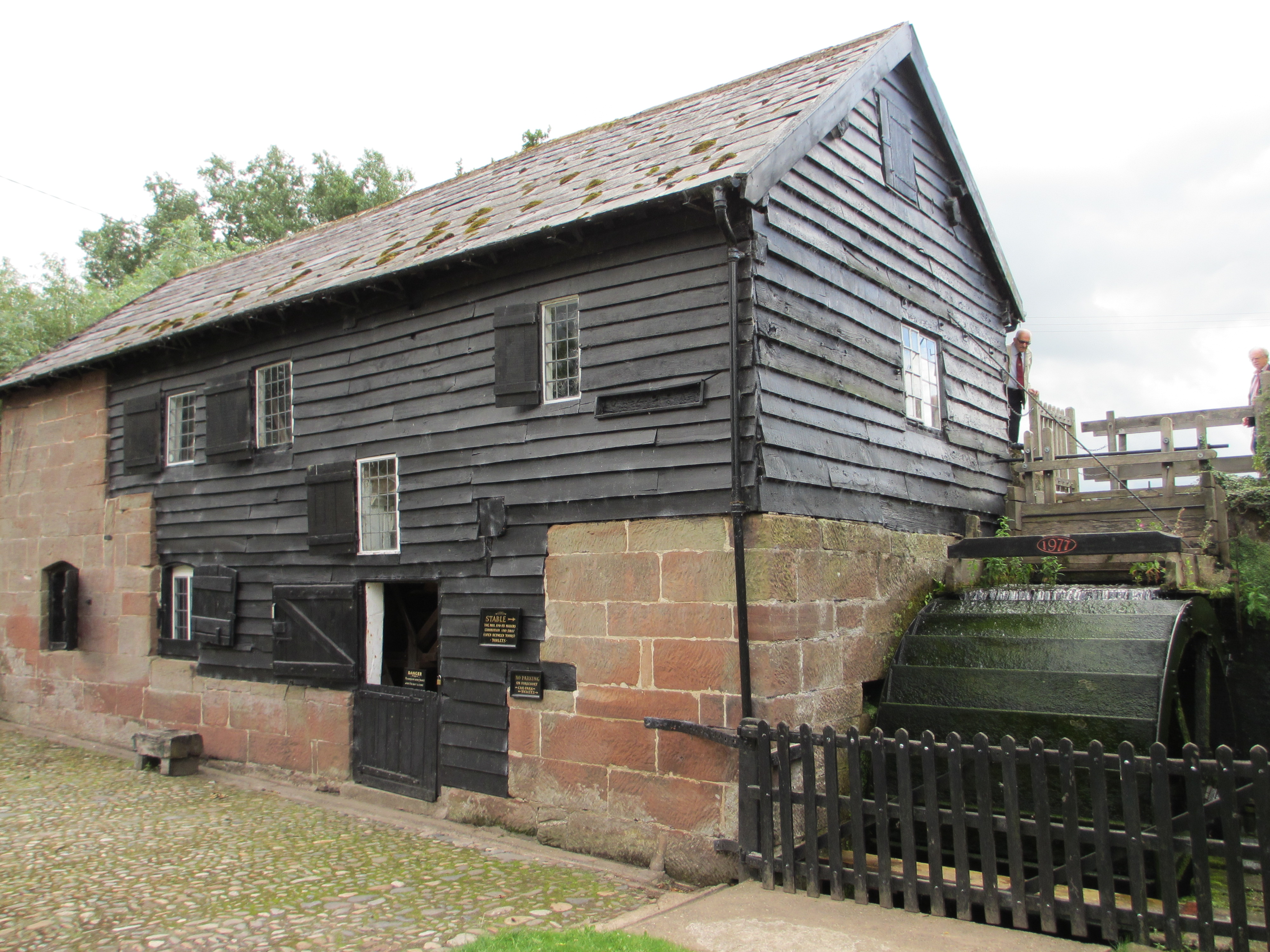
- Stretton Watermill

- Stretton Watermill in Cheshire
- 53.07156°N 2.81564°W
- Location: Stretton, Cheshire West and Chester

History
- Built: 16th century

Site notes
- Governing body: Cheshire West and Chester Council
- Website: strettonwatermill.westcheshiremuseums.co.uk

Listed Building – Grade II*
- Designated: 18 July 1972
- Reference no.: 1279423

Stretton Watermill is a working historic watermill in Stretton, Cheshire, England. It is owned and administered by Cheshire West and Chester Council. The mill is recorded in the National Heritage List for England as a designated Grade II* listed building and the mill machinery is considered to be of national importance.

== History ==
The earliest record of the mill is when it changed ownership in 1351. In the 16th century the mill was owned by the Leche family. The oldest surviving structure of the building date from 1630, at which time it was timber-framed and had a single breastshot wheel. The cobbled ground floor surface is thought to pre-date the 1630 building. In 1770 the mill was extended by William Leche, the roof was raised and the thatched roof replaced by slates. The timber framing was encased in weatherboarding and sandstone, and an overshot wheel was added. This work is commemorated by an inscribed stone on the west corner of the building. In 1852 the timber breastshot wheel was replaced by a similar type of wheel in cast iron. The mill finally ceased operation in 1959. The mill machinery was restored by Cyril & John Boucher during 1975–7, with partial funding from the Science Museum. The mill has been a museum since 1977.

== Description ==
The mill is constructed on a timber-framed core, and is cased in weatherboarding and sandstone. There is a brick extension, and a chimney in stone and brick. The roofs are slated. The mill is in two storeys, with an attic for storing grain. The windows are all casements, some with shutters. There are two working waterwheels, one on the outside, the other inside the building. The external wheel is a timber overshot wheel, which drives largely 18th-century wooden machinery. The internal wheel is in cast iron, and is breastshot; it drives Victorian mainly cast-iron machinery. The upper storey, which contains four millstones, is entered by a steep internal stairway, and the grain loft is accessed by a ladder. Outside the mill are stone steps leading up to the mill dam, and a stone-lined millrace with a sluice.

== Present day ==
The site operates as a museum, picnic area and visitor centre. It is open to the general public on advertised days during April–September between 1 p.m. and 5 p.m., and whilst access to the site is free, there is a small charge for a guided tour of the mill's interior if required. In addition to the working mill, there is a shop and exhibition area in the former stables, outdoor picnic tables, and accessible toilet facilities. Guided tours for groups (both during and outside normal opening hours) can be arranged in advance, and there is an education programme available for schools. Both storeys of the mill are fully accessible to wheelchair users, the upper storey via a ramped external pathway.

== See also ==
- Grade II* listed buildings in Cheshire West and Chester
- Listed buildings in Stretton, Cheshire West and Chester
- List of museums in Cheshire
