= St Mary's Church, Tilston =

Coordinates: 53.0497°N 2.8109°W

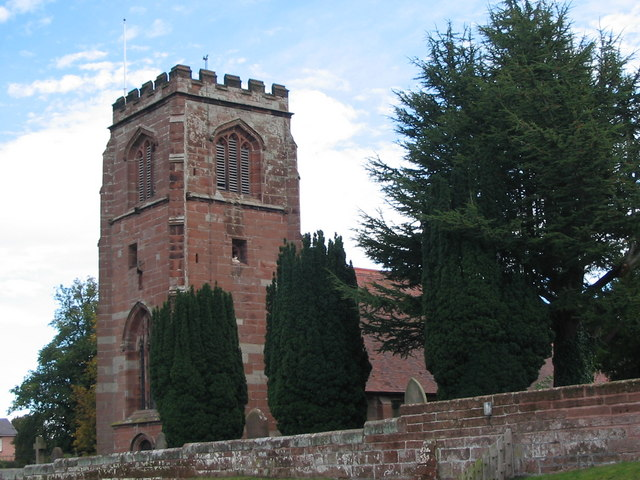
- St Mary's Church, Tilston

- Location in Cheshire
- OS grid reference: SJ 457,506
- Location: Tilston, Cheshire
- Country: England
- Denomination: Anglican
- Website: www.tilstonandshocklachchurch.co.uk

History
- Status: Parish church

Architecture
- Functional status: Active
- Heritage designation: Grade II*
- Designated: 1 March 1967
- Architect: John Douglas
- Architectural type: Church
- Style: Gothic, Gothic Revival
- Completed: 1879

Specifications
- Materials: Red sandstone, tile roof

Administration
- Province: York
- Diocese: Chester
- Archdeaconry: Chester
- Deanery: Malpas
- Parish: Tilston

Clergy
- Rector: Revd Tim Robinson

St Mary's Church stands in an isolated position to the south of the village of Tilston, Cheshire, England. The church is recorded in the National Heritage List for England as a designated Grade II* listed building. It is an active Anglican parish church in the diocese of Chester, the archdeaconry of Chester, and the deanery of Malpas. Its benefice is combined with that of St Edith, Shocklach.

== History ==
An earlier church stood on the site of the present church and there is a list of rectors dating from 1301. The oldest part of the present church is the tower which dates from the 15th century. The chapel on the north side is dated 1659 and is known as the Leche Chapel, or the Stretton Hall Chapel. Most of the rest of the church, including the chancel, vestry and nave roof, was rebuilt by John Douglas between 1877 and 1879.

== Architecture ==
=== Exterior ===
The church is built in red sandstone with a steeply pitched tile roof. At the west end is the three-stage embattled tower. This has corner buttresses, a west doorway, a west window of three lights, belfry windows of three lights on all sides and ringers' windows, the one on the west face being placed north of the centre. The west door has a Tudor head. The tower leads into the nave through a fine arch. The original Elizabethan roof was dismantled in the 19th-century rebuild, and some of the timbers were used in the chancel roof. The south door has been blocked off, and entry is through the north porch. In the north porch is part of a curved beam taken from a gallery which was dismantled in 1879, and which bears the arms of Peter and Ann Warburton. The beam is dated 1618.

=== Interior ===
The altar rails are dated 1677, and the holy table is from the same period. The octagonal pulpit is early Georgian in style, and it stands on a stone base from a later period. Most of the glass dates from the 19th century, but some painted medieval glass remains. There were originally a ring of 4 bells cast in 1672 and 1678, these were recast and augmented to 6 bells ring, cast in 1924 and installed in 1925 by John Taylor and Company. The parish registers date from 1558 but are incomplete. The churchwardens' accounts are from 1688. The clock installed in the tower is dated 1750 and bears a makers mark of "Joseph Smith Chester Fecit" together with the names John Barker and John Jones Churchwardens (See photograph)

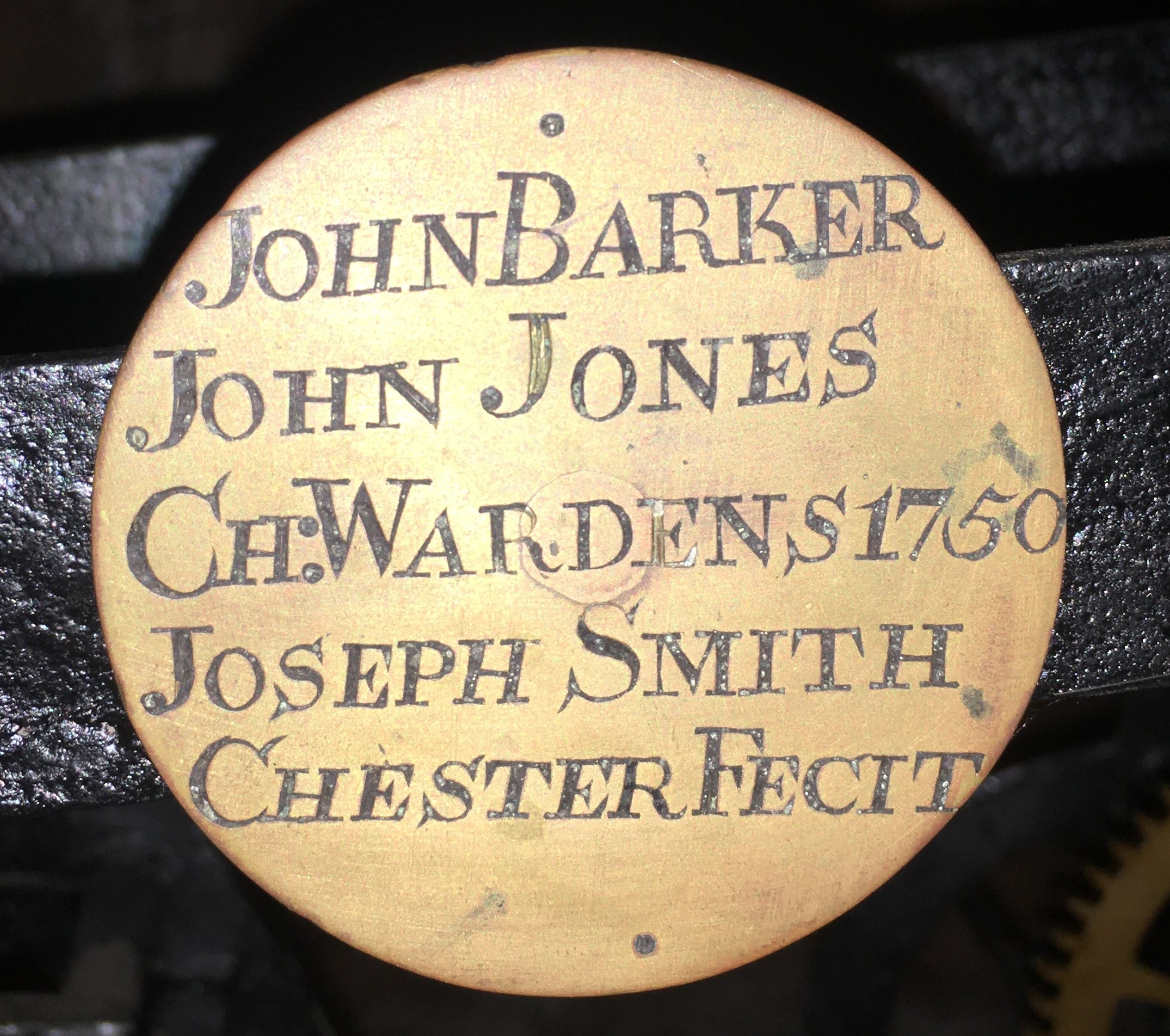
St Mary's Church Clock, Makers Plate

== External features ==
In the churchyard is a sundial with an octagonal shaft on the base of an ancient cross. The head is elaborately shaped. The gates, gate piers and churchyard wall to the west of the church are listed at Grade II. On the west side of the gate piers is the date 1687 and the initials "LP" and "LL". On the south side of the posts there are skull and crossbones symbols and on the east side is the inscription Memento Mori. The churchyard also contains the war graves of a soldier of World War I, and another of World War II.

== See also ==
- Grade II* listed buildings in Cheshire West and Chester
- Listed buildings in Tilston
- List of church restorations, amendments and furniture by John Douglas
