= Zaanse Time Museum =

Museum in Zaanse Schans, Netherlands

- Museum Zaanse Tijd
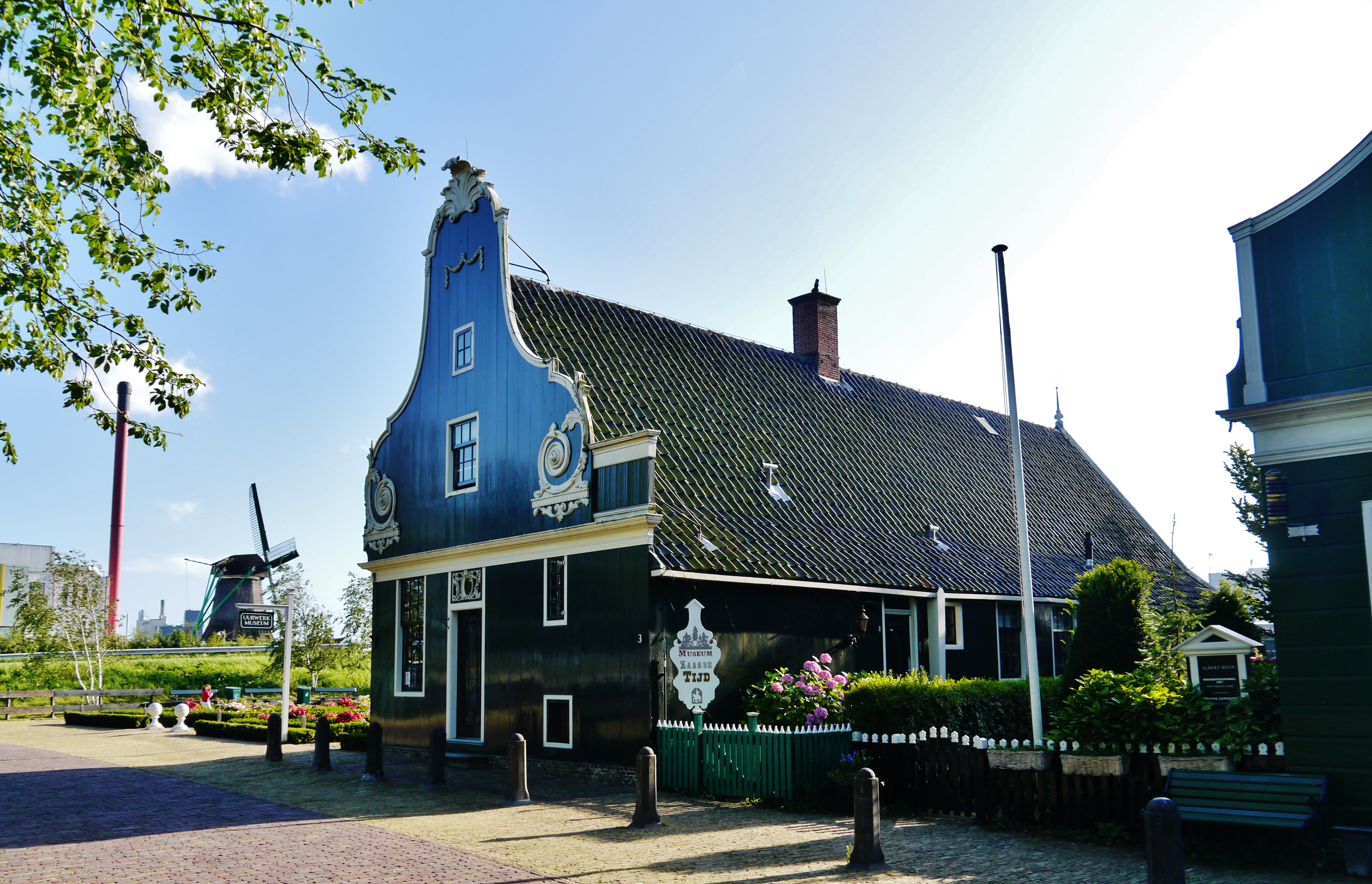
- Established: 3 February 1976
- Location: Zaanse Schans
- Coordinates: 52°28′18.6″N 4°48′55.7″E
- Accreditation: Rijksmonument
- Key holdings: Clocks and watches
- Owner: Zaans Uurwerken Museum Foundation

The Zaanse Time Museum (Dutch: Museum Zaanse Tijd) is a clock museum located in the Zaanse Schans in the North Holland municipality of Zaanstad.

== History ==
The museum was founded at the initiative of the municipality of Zaandam and opened by Prince Claus on 3 February 1976. In 1985, it was threatened with closure but saved through fundraising and the establishment of the Zaans Uurwerken Museum Foundation.

== Collection ==
The collection consists of Zaanse and Dutch clocks, timepieces, and watches. Significant attention is given to the Zaanse clock of the Dutch Golden Age, which has remained popular at various times since then.

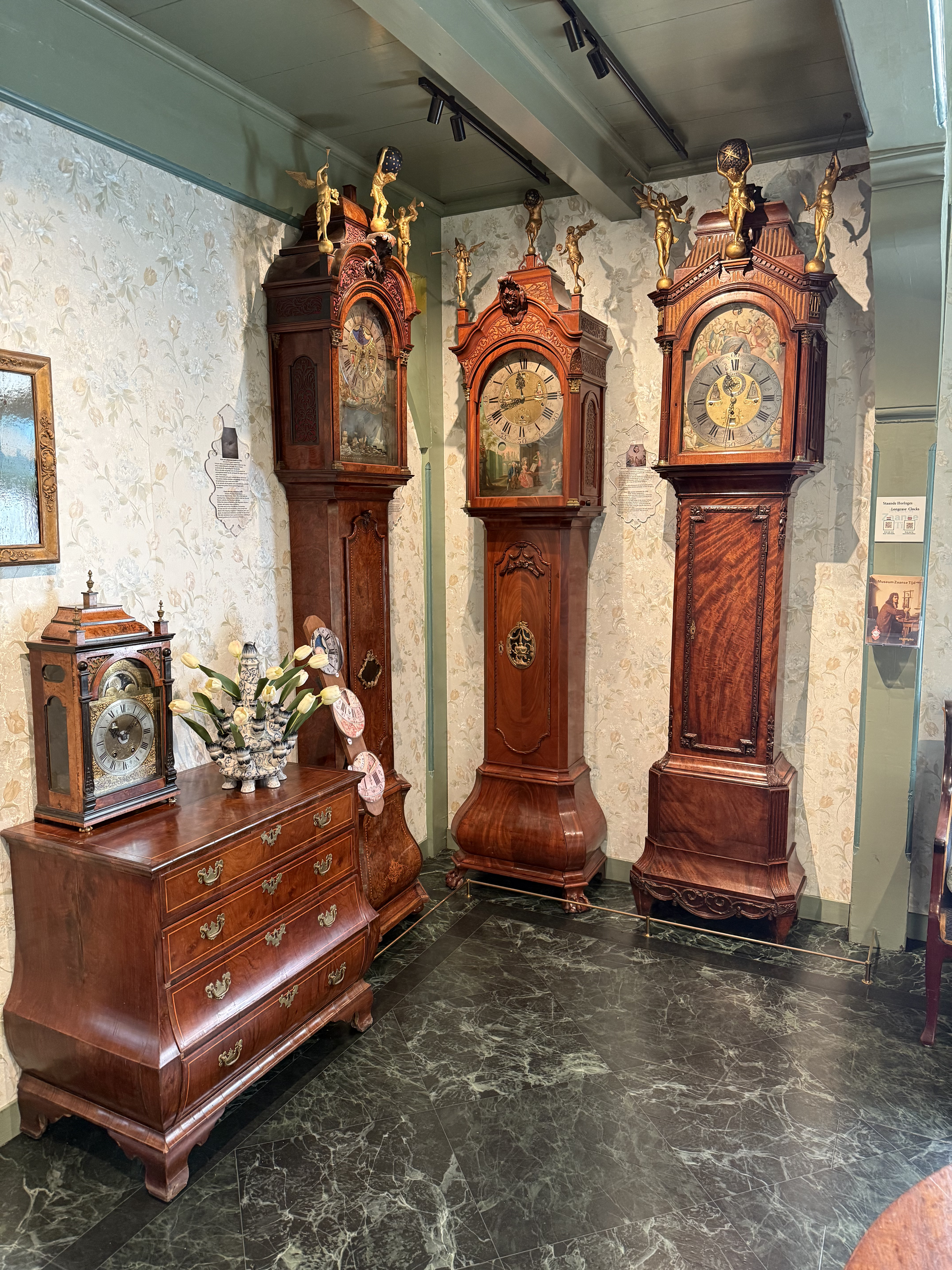
Longcase and table clocks

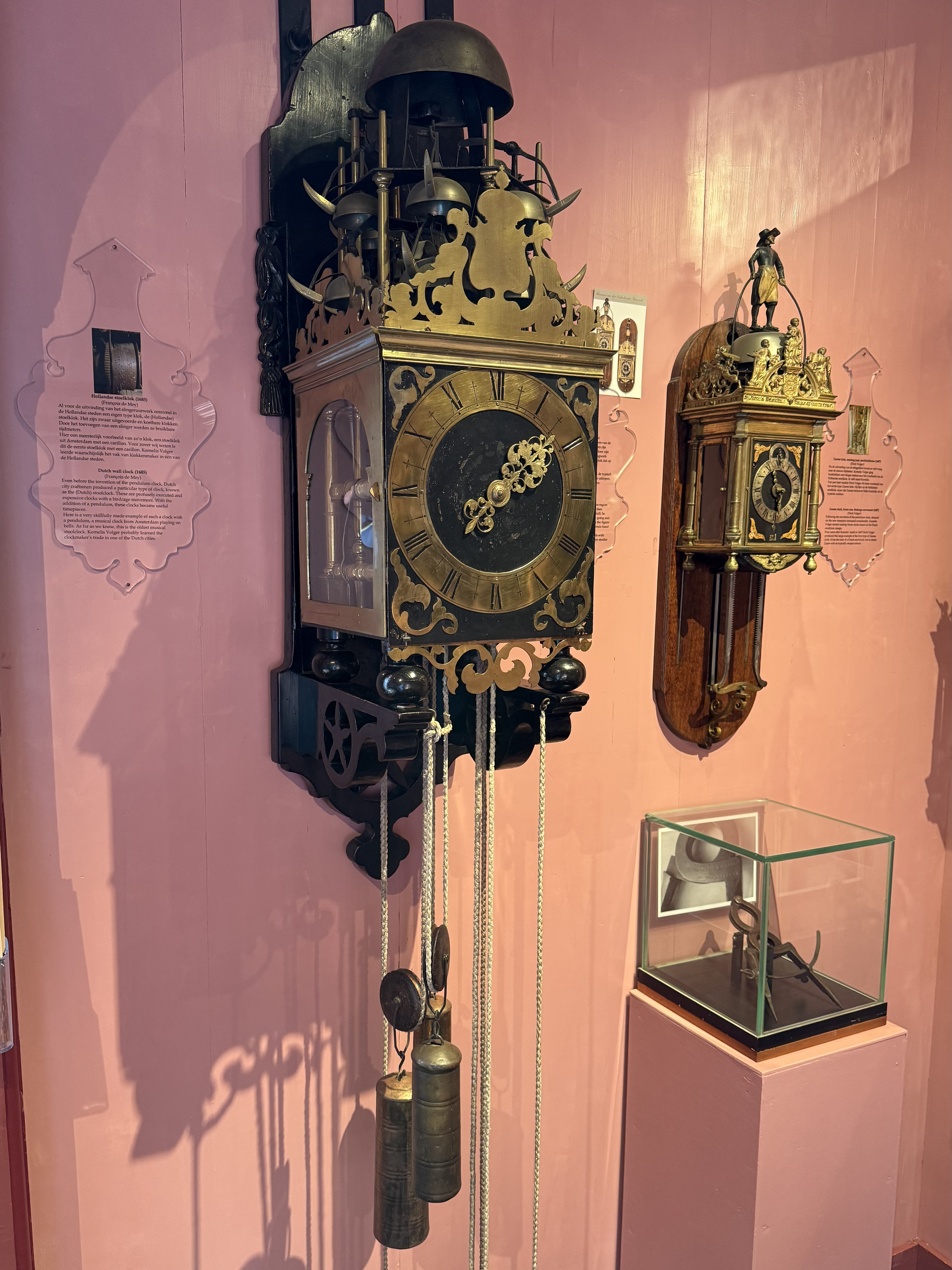
Dutch wall clock of 1685

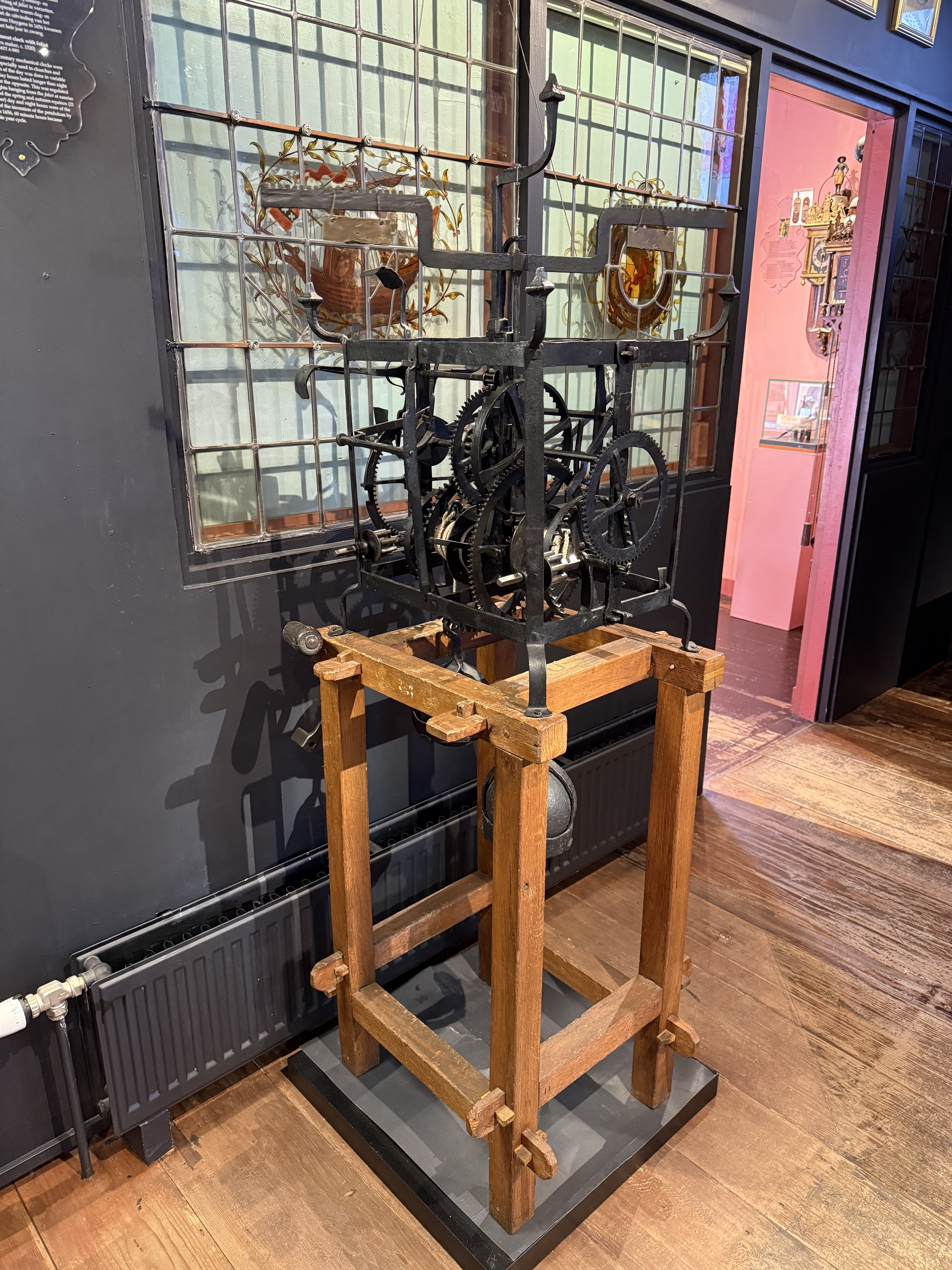
Late mediæval turret clock with foliot

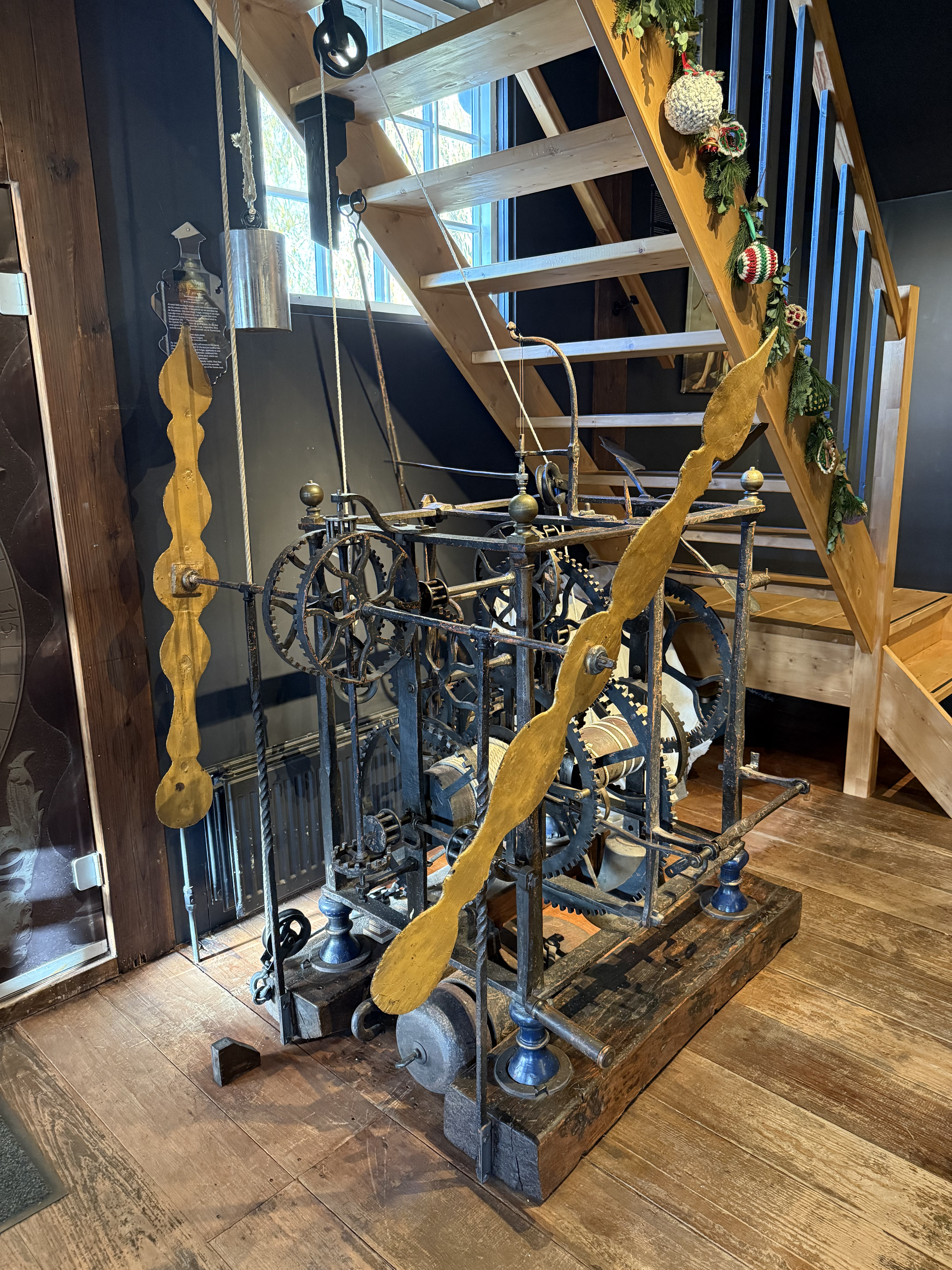
Turret clock by Dirck Volger 1690

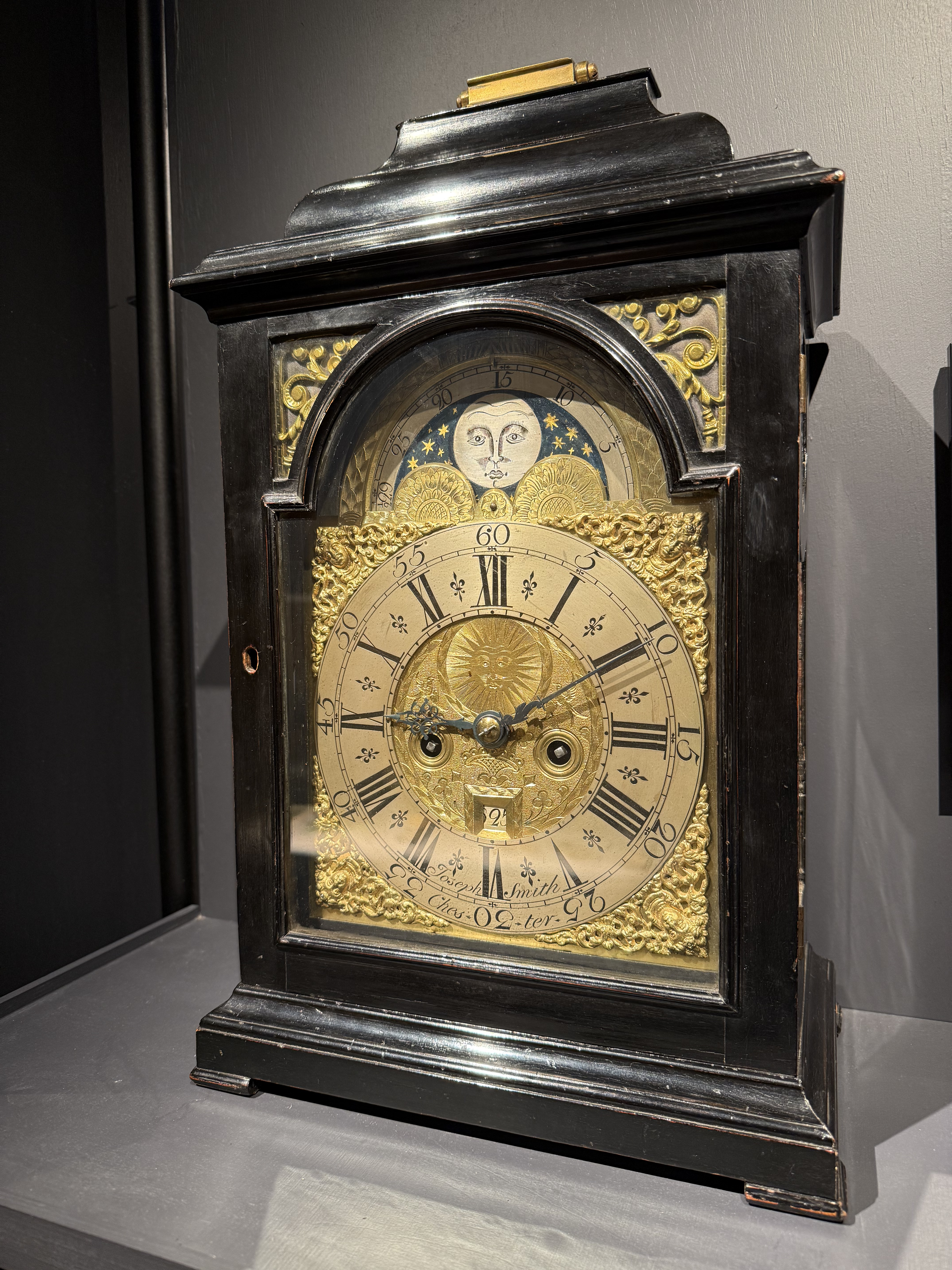
English table clock by Joseph Smith of Chester ca. 1750

== Building ==
The museum is housed in a 17th-century national monument, a sailcloth weaver's house brought from Assendelft which has been furnished with period rooms.
