= Joseph Smith (clockmaker) =

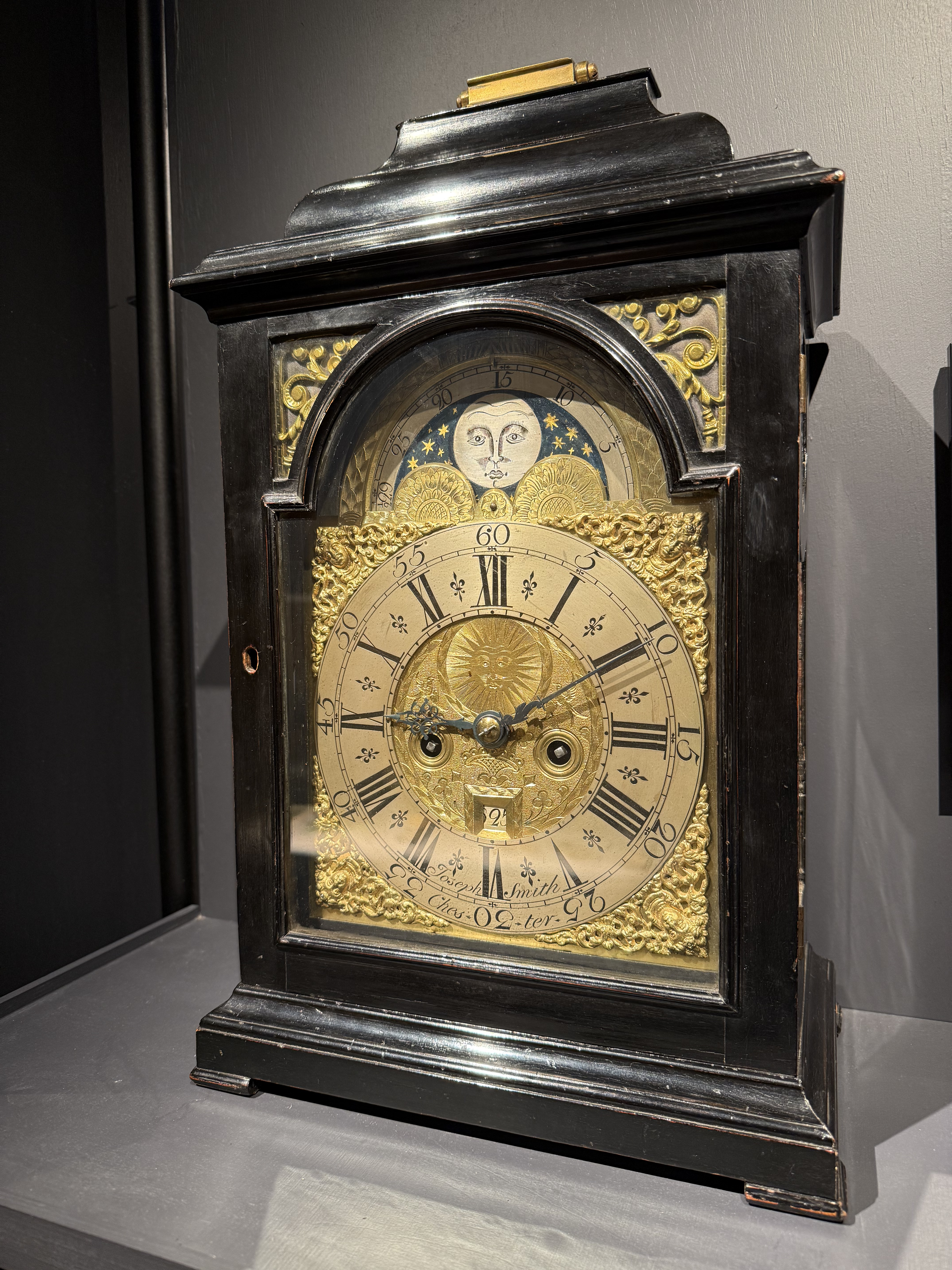
Table clock ca. 1750 in the Zaanse Time Museum

Joseph Smith (b. ca. 1688) was a clockmaker based in Chester in the early part of the 18th century.

== Life ==
Joseph was born ca .1688 in Barthomley, the son of Gabriel Smith (1655–1743) a clockmaker, and Ann Whittingham (1655–1738).

Around 1721 Gabriel Smith moved his family to Nantwich, and in 1724-25 Joseph left home and moved to the Gloverstone area of Chester. Just after he settled in the city, he was commissioned to make a new turret clock for Chester Cathedral. As part of this commission he was paid 16s annually (equivalent to £150 in 2023) for its maintenance. The clock had no dial, but chimed the quarters with a ting-tang on two bells and struck the hour. The pendulum period was 1¼ seconds.

In addition to turret clocks, he produced long case and mantel clocks. An example of a mantel clock was auctioned as Lot 59 by Bonhams on 11 July 2018 and made £5,250 and another exists in the collection of the Zaanse Time Museum in Holland.

He married Mary Hulse (1698–1761) in Acton, Nantwich on 24 February 1717/18 and had five sons who attended King's School, Chester and one daughter.

- John Smith (1718–1784)
- Joseph Smith (b. 1720)
- Mary Smith (b. 1722)
- Gabriel Smith (1726–1810)
- Thomas Smith (b. 1728)
- Samuel Smith (b. 1733)

== Turret clocks ==
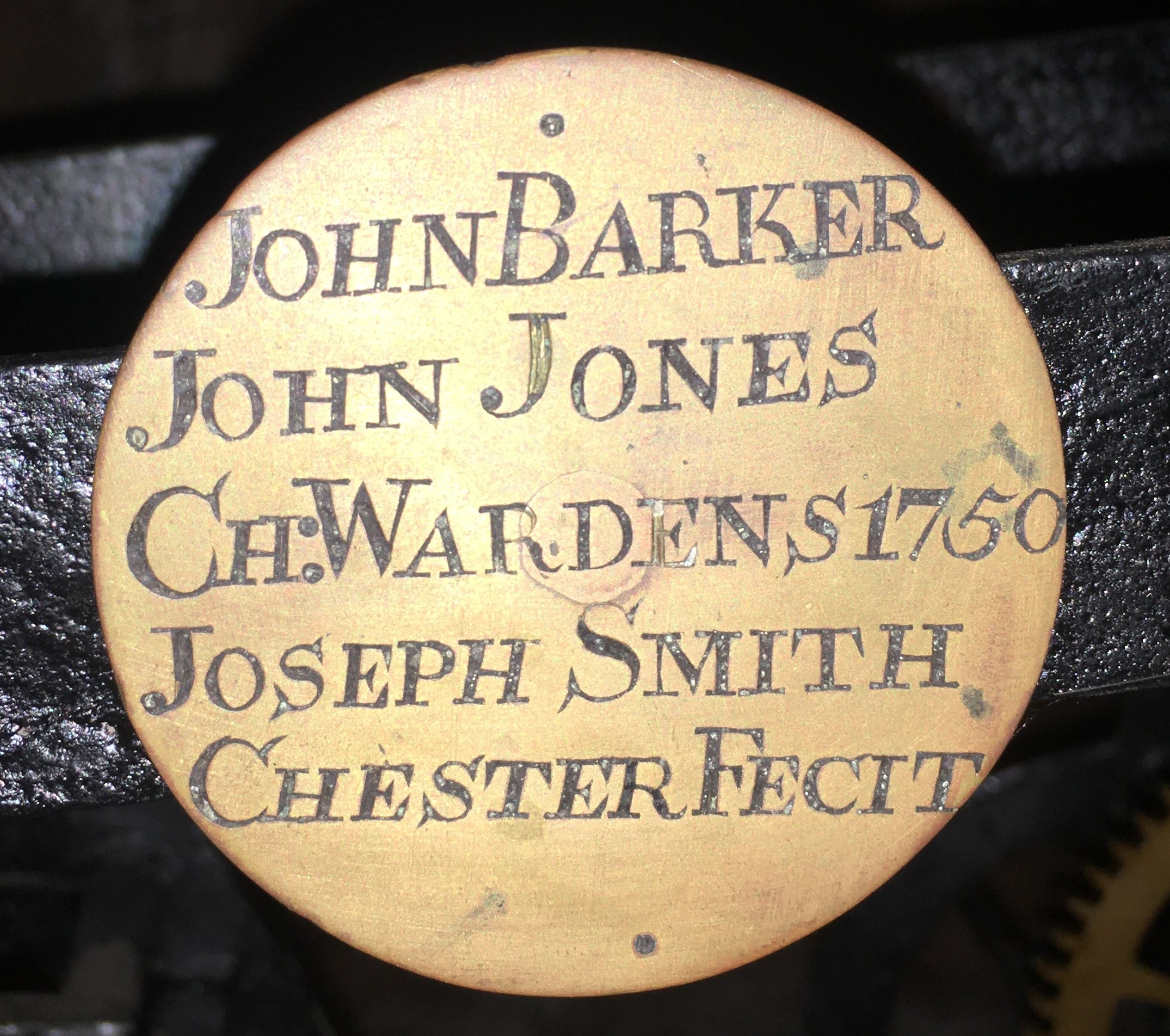
Maker's plate on the clock in St Mary's Church, Tilston

- Chester Cathedral 1725 (replaced 1872). Auctioned by Christies on 7 December 2005 and made £3,600.
- St Michael's Church, Shotwick 1726
- St Peter's Church, Little Budworth 1727 for the sum of £10 (equivalent to £1,879 in 2023).
- St Lawrence's Church, Stoak 1732
- St Helen's Church, Tarporley 1736 for £5 5s. (equivalent to £1,138 in 2023).
- St John the Baptist's Church, Chester 1746 (replaced)
- St Mary's Church, Tilston 1750
- St Nicholas’ Church, Burton 1751
- St Mary's Church, Mucklestone
- St Alban's Church, Tattenhall (attributed)
- Poulton Hall 1755
- Adlington Hall 1755
- Pengwern Hall
- Whitemore Hall
