= Eynion de Tilston =

Norman nobleman in England

Eynion de Tilston (born c. 1126) was a Norman knight and first lord of the manor of Tilston in the English county of Cheshire.

== Lord of Tilston ==
In the 12th century, William de Malpas gave Eynion the manor of Tilston in Cheshire, near the Welsh border. Sir Eynion was given the Manor of Tilston by the Earl of Chester in return for military service. He and his descendants were constantly alert, because of Welsh raids upon the border areas.

== Marriage, family and descendants ==
In 1154 Eynion married Beatrix de Gernons, daughter of Ranulf de Gernon, Earl of Chester. They had at least one son born around 1156. The name of his son is unknown, possibly Einion de Tilston born around 1156.

== Resources ==
- Cheshire towns and villages including Tilston

Preceded by New Creation	Lord of Tilston	Succeeded by ? de Tilston
