= Gabriel Smith (d.1743) =

Gabriel Smith (1655–1743) was a clockmaker based in Barthomley and Nantwich.

== Life ==
He was born on 4 April 1655 in Audley, Staffordshire, the son of Humphrey Smith/Smithe (1619–1699)

He married Ann Whittingham (1655–1738) on 3 June 1682 in Barthomley and they had the following children

- Gabriel Smith (24 December 1685–1708)
- Abraham Smith (b. 15 May 1865)
- Joseph Smith (b. ca. 1688)
- Samuel Smith (2 June 1688 - 20 June 1688)
- Ann Smith (b. 20 March 1696)

He took John Yeomans as an apprentice in 1714 and John Penlington as another in 1717, and his son Joseph followed him into the business, eventually leaving Nantwich and setting up business in Chester.

Around 1721 Gabriel Smith moved his family to Nantwich where he was also described as a bellfounder, carpenter and millwright. He manufactured several turret clocks for churches in Cheshire, and also manufactured lantern, bracket and 30 hour clocks which still come up for auction. The Nantwich Museum has some examples of his work.

He died on 30 April 1743 in Nantwich, Cheshire and was buried on 3 May 1743 in St Bertoline's Church, Barthomley.

== Turret clocks ==
- St Michael and All Angels, Middlewich 1708
- Sheppenhall Hall (unknown date) (removed in 1935)
