= Caldecott, Cheshire =

Former civil parish in England

Coordinates: 53.056°N 2.849°W

Caldecott
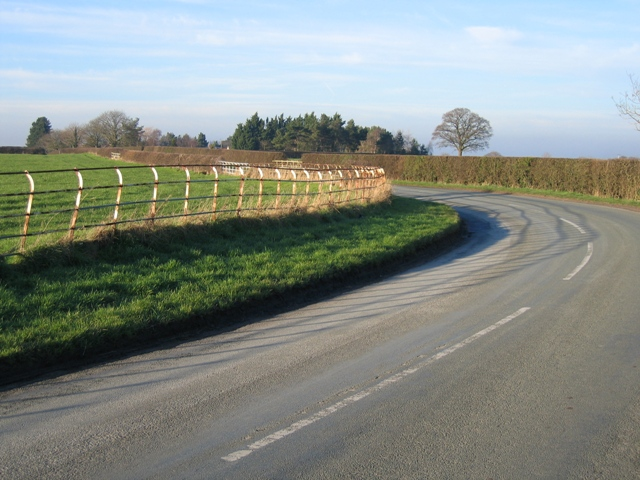
- Caldecott

- Location within Cheshire
- Population: 24 (2001)
- OS grid reference: SJ4351
- Civil parish: Shocklach Oviatt and District
- Unitary authority: Cheshire West and Chester
- Ceremonial county: Cheshire
- Region: North West
- Country: England
- Sovereign state: United Kingdom
- Post town: CHESTER
- Postcode district: CH3
- Dialling code: 01829
- Police: Cheshire
- Fire: Cheshire
- Ambulance: North West
- UK Parliament: Chester South and Eddisbury

Caldecott is a former civil parish, now in the parish of Shocklach Oviatt and District, in the Borough of Cheshire West and Chester and ceremonial county of Cheshire in England. In 2001 it has a population of 24. The main settlement in the parish was Caldecott Green. Caldecott was formerly a township in the parish of Shocklach, in 1866 Caldecott became a separate civil parish, on 1 April 2015 the parish was abolished to form Shocklach Oviatt and District.
