= Stretton Lower Hall =

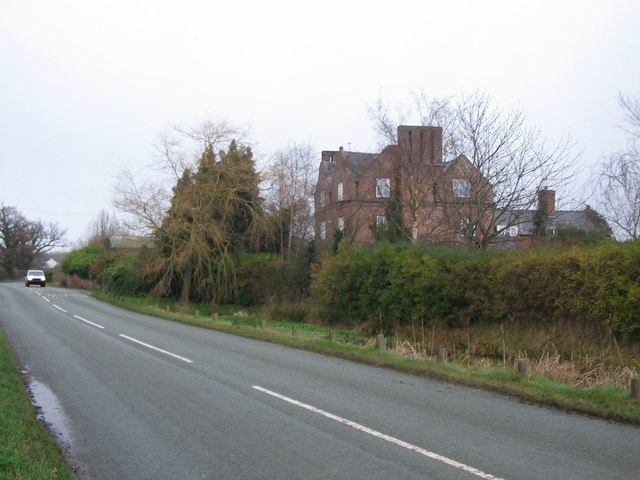
- The Hall in 2007

- Location within Cheshire
- 53.07207°N 2.82390°W
- Location: Stretton, Cheshire

Listed Building – Grade II
- Official name: Stretton Lower Hall
- Designated: 1 March 1967
- Reference no.: 1229207

Stretton Lower Hall is in the parish of Stretton in Cheshire, England. It was built in 1660, on a site that was originally moated. The house is constructed in brick with a slate roof and a sandstone cellar. It has three storeys plus a cellar, with a symmetrical front containing shaped gables. There are dentil bands of brick between the storeys. The house is recorded in the National Heritage List for England as a designated Grade II listed building.

== See also ==
- Listed buildings in Stretton, Cheshire West and Chester
- Stretton Hall, Cheshire
- Stretton Old Hall
