= Barton, Cheshire =

Village and civil parish in England

Coordinates: 53.082°N 2.825°W

Barton
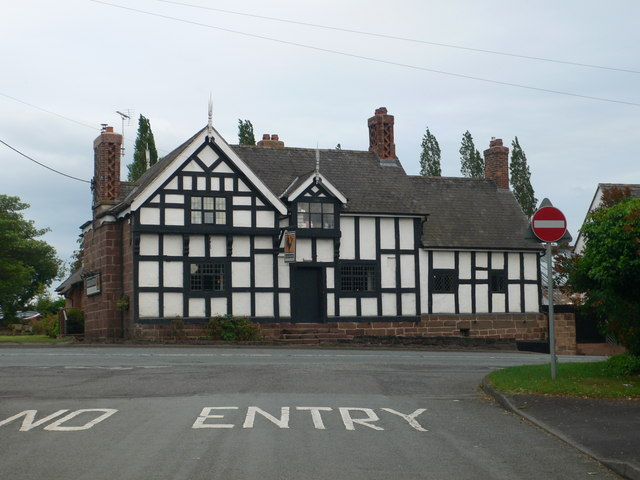
- The Cock o' Barton

- Location within Cheshire
- Population: 123 (2011 census) (Barton & Stretton)
- OS grid reference: SJ448541
- Civil parish: Barton
- Unitary authority: Cheshire West and Chester
- Ceremonial county: Cheshire
- Region: North West
- Country: England
- Sovereign state: United Kingdom
- Post town: MALPAS
- Postcode district: SY14
- Dialling code: 01829
- Police: Cheshire
- Fire: Cheshire
- Ambulance: North West
- UK Parliament: Chester South and Eddisbury

Barton is a village and civil parish in the unitary authority of Cheshire West and Chester and the ceremonial county of Cheshire, England. The village is located near the Welsh border, about twelve miles south of Chester and about eight miles east of Wrexham in Wales.

The name Barton means 'barley farm/settlement', derived from the Old English bere (barley) and tūn (a farmstead or settlement).

Barton was a township in Farndon parish of Broxton Hundred, which became a civil parish in 1866. The population was recorded as 143 in 1801, 146 in 1851, 126 in 1901 and had fallen to 109 by 1951. In 2001 the village had a population of 71. According to the 2001 census, the civil parish was combined with neighbouring Stretton civil parish and the figure was given as 122. In the 2011 census Barton and Stretton were again combined. The population had increased by one to 123.

The A534 road passes through the village. The National Cycle Network Regional Route 70 passes just to the south of the village.

The ancient church serving Barton is at Farndon, St. Chad's.

The pub is the "Cock o' Barton".

== See also ==
- Listed buildings in Barton, Cheshire
