= Stretton Old Hall =

- Location within Cheshire
- 53.07003°N 2.82449°W
- Location: Stretton, Cheshire

Listed Building – Grade II
- Official name: Old Hall Farmhouse
- Designated: 1 March 1967
- Reference no.: 1279171

Stretton Old Hall is in the parish of Stretton in Cheshire, England. It was built in the 17th century, and extended in the 19th century. It is constructed in brick with a slate roof. The entrance front includes a two-storey porch with a shaped gable and a larger shaped gable on a cross wing to the right. It is recorded in the National Heritage List for England as a designated Grade II listed building.

== See also ==
- Listed buildings in Stretton, Cheshire West and Chester
- Stretton Hall, Cheshire
- Stretton Lower Hall
