= Aldersey =

Civil parish in Cheshire, England

Coordinates: 53.09°N 02.80°W

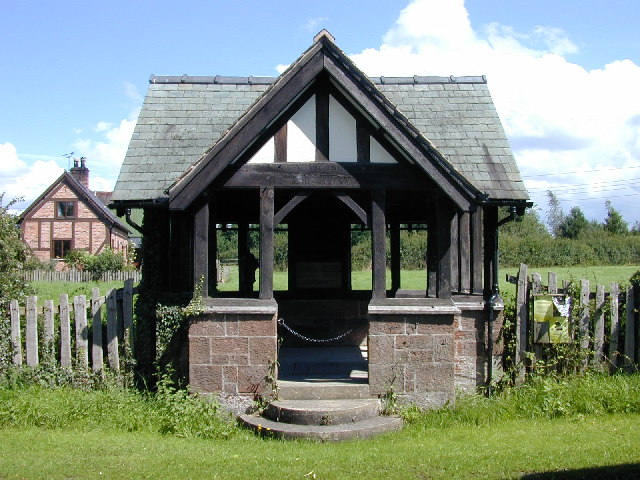
- War Memorial

- Location within Cheshire
- Population: 132 (2011)
- OS grid reference: SJ4656
- Civil parish: Aldersey
- Unitary authority: Cheshire West and Chester
- Ceremonial county: Cheshire
- Region: North West
- Country: England
- Sovereign state: United Kingdom
- Post town: Chester
- Postcode district: CH3
- Police: Cheshire
- Fire: Cheshire
- Ambulance: North West
- UK Parliament: Chester South and Eddisbury

Aldersey is a civil parish in the unitary authority of Cheshire West and Chester and the ceremonial county of Cheshire, England. It contains the villages of Aldersey Green grid reference SJ461567 and Aldersey Park SJ459561, and is about 9 miles (14 km) south-east of Chester. According to the 2001 census the parish had a population of 72, increasing to 132 at the 2011 census.

== See also ==
- Listed buildings in Aldersey
