= Lower Carden Hall =

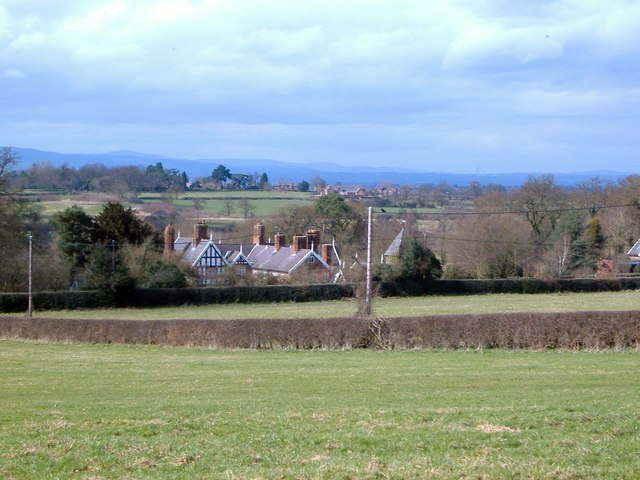

- Location in Cheshire
- 53.06458°N 2.80692°W
- OS grid reference: SJ 462 521

History
- Built: 15th century

Listed Building – Grade I
- Designated: 22 October 1952
- Reference no.: 1229918

Lower Carden Hall is a historic house in the civil parish of Carden, Cheshire, England. It is recorded in the National Heritage List for England as a designated Grade I listed building.

The oldest part of the house is the north wing which dates back to the 15th century, or earlier. A south cross-wing was added in the middle of the 16th century and the north wing was enlarged and re-fronted in the early 17th century. Alterations and additions were made to the rear of the house in the late 19th century. The major part of the house is timber-framed with oak frames and plaster panels on a sandstone plinth. The north end gable is built in stone and brick. The rear wing is of brick with steeply pitched grey slate roofs. On the north gable and on south wall of the cross-wing are massive projecting chimneys of stone and brick. The house was substantially restored in about 1984 with a brick inner skin and steelwork.

== See also ==
- Grade I listed buildings in Cheshire
- Listed buildings in Carden, Cheshire West and Chester
