= Shocklach Oviatt and District =

Civil parish in Cheshire, England

Coordinates: 53.0401°N 2.8377°W

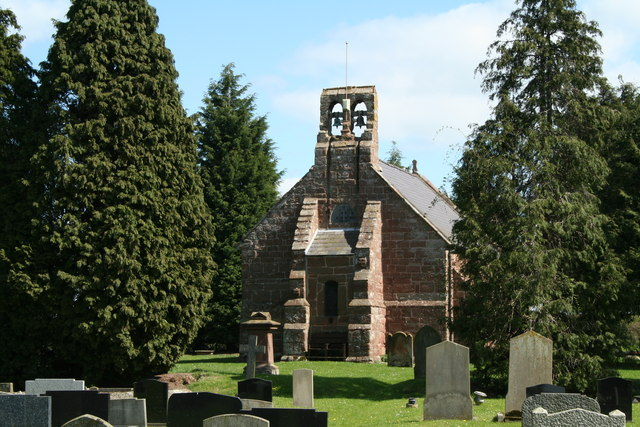
- Shocklach church

- Location within Cheshire
- Population: 310 (2015)
- Civil parish: Shocklach Oviatt and District
- Unitary authority: Cheshire West and Chester
- Ceremonial county: Cheshire
- Region: North West
- Country: England
- Sovereign state: United Kingdom
- Post town: Malpas
- Postcode district: SY14
- UK Parliament: Chester South and Eddisbury

Shocklach Oviatt and District is a civil parish in the Cheshire West and Chester unitary authority, in the county of Cheshire, England.

The parish was created in 2015, combining the previous civil parishes of Caldecott, Church Shocklach, Horton by Malpas and Shocklach Oviatt. Settlements in the parish include Caldecott Green, Shocklach, Horton Green, Castletown, Green Croft, Lane End, Little Green, Lordsfields, Port Green, Shocklach Green and The Saughans.

It has a parish council, the lowest tier of local government.

The 2015 mid-year estimate of the parish population was 310.
