= Stretton Hall, Cheshire =

Stretton Hall
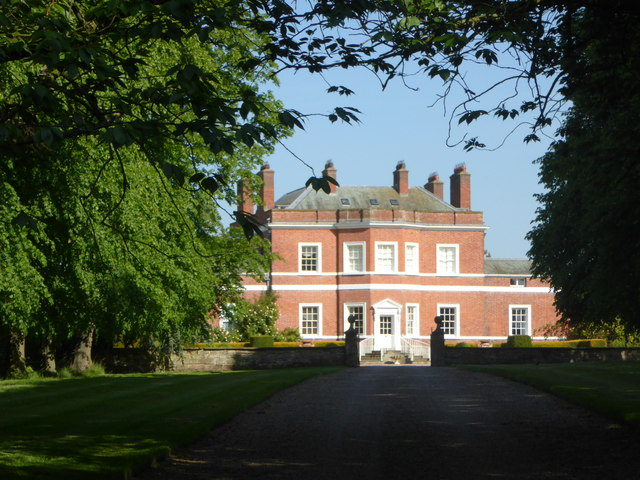
- The Hall in 2015

- Location within Cheshire
- 53.06891°N 2.82691°W
- Location: Stretton, Cheshire

Listed Building – Grade II
- Official name: Stretton Hall and adjoining stable wing
- Designated: 22 October 1952
- Reference no.: 1229257

Stretton Hall is a country house in the parish of Stretton in Cheshire, England. It was built in about 1763 for John Leche. The house is constructed in brick on a sandstone basement, with painted stone dressings, and a slate roof. It has three symmetrical elevations. The entrance front is in three two-storey bays with a single-storey wing on each side. The central bay is canted, with five steps leading up to a doorway with a pediment. The windows are sashes. The garden front has similar windows, other than the wings, each of which contains a Venetian window. To the right of the house is attached a further wing, converted from the 17th-century stable of an earlier house. The house and former stable area is recorded in the National Heritage List for England as a designated Grade II* listed building. The sandstone garden walls are listed at Grade II.

== See also ==
- Grade II* listed buildings in Cheshire West and Chester
- Listed buildings in Stretton, Cheshire West and Chester
- Stretton Lower Hall
- Stretton Old Hall
