= Listed buildings in Aldersey =

Aldersey is a civil parish in Cheshire West and Chester, England. It contains eleven buildings that are recorded in the National Heritage List for England as designated listed buildings, all of which are at Grade II. This grade is the lowest of the three gradings given to listed buildings and is applied to "buildings of national importance and special interest". The parish is entirely rural, and contains the villages of Aldersey Green and Aldersey Park. Other than a war memorial, all the listed buildings are domestic or related to farming, and most are clustered around Aldersey Green.

Name and location	Photograph	Date	Notes
Aldersey Manor; 53.1051°N 2.8063°W		c. 1600 (probable)	Basically timber-framed, much of the farmhouse was encased in brick in the 19th century. The right wing was added in 1635, and an extension in the 20th century. The farmhouse stands on a sandstone plinth, and has a slate roof. On the ridge is a massive brick chimney with three detached diagonal flues. Inside, the former great hall contains an inglenook with massive chamfered beams.
Barn, Manor Farm; 53.1054°N 2.8065°W		Early 17th century	Originally a barn, it has been altered to contain a swimming pool. The building is timber-framed with brick infill on a sandstone plinth, and has a slate roof.
Manor Farm Cottage; 53.1047°N 2.8053°W		17th century	A timber-framed cottage, encased in brick probably in the early 19th century. It has a slate roof, and is in two storeys. The windows are casements. Inside the cottage is an inglenook.
Pool Farmhouse; 53.1048°N 2.8047°W		17th century	The farmhouse has a rendered front painted to give the appearance of timber framing. It is in two storeys, with a slate roof, its front having three gables. The farmhouse has a Georgian door in a pedimented wooden doorcase.
Pump House Cottage; 53.1062°N 2.8056°W		17th century	This timber-framed building was originally a barn or shippon. It has brick nogging, and a corrugated iron roof. It is a rectangular building, with gables in a single storeys. The windows are 19th-century casements.
Yew Tree Farmhouse; 53.0952°N 2.8023°W	—	1654	A timber-framed farmhouse with brick nogging and a steeply pitched slate roof. At each end is a cross-gable, subsequently rebuilt. On the ridge is a massive brick chimney, and there is a central gabled dormer. The windows are 19th-century casements.
Manor Cottage; 53.1056°N 2.8070°W		Mid-18th century (probable)	A brick house, altered in about 1930, with a slate roof and a stone parapet. It is in two storeys, and has a symmetrical entrance front. The windows are casements. Inside the house is an inglenook with chamfered beams.
Green Farmhouse; 53.1064°N 2.8077°W		Early 19th century	The farmhouse is constructed in brick on a stuccoed plinth and has a slate roof. It is in three storeys, with a symmetrical entrance front. The windows are sashes.
Gatepiers, Aldersey Lodge; 53.10421°N 2.80568°W		c. 1850	A pair of square gate-piers in sandstone with ball finials. They stand at the entrance to the former Aldersey Lodge, which has been demolished and the gates removed.
Gatepiers, Top Lodge; 53.09617°N 2.80593°W	—	c. 1850	A pair of square gate-piers in sandstone. They have overhanging cornices decorated with voluting, arabesque motifs, and fleur-de-lis.
War memorial 53.10593°N 2.80599°W		c. 1919	The memorial is in the form of a well-house; the well is now sealed. It is surrounded by timber-framed walls on a sandstone plinth, with a Westmorland slate roof. Inside are oak seats on sandstone supports.
