= Shocklach =

Village in Cheshire, England

Coordinates: 53.03699°N 2.838511°W

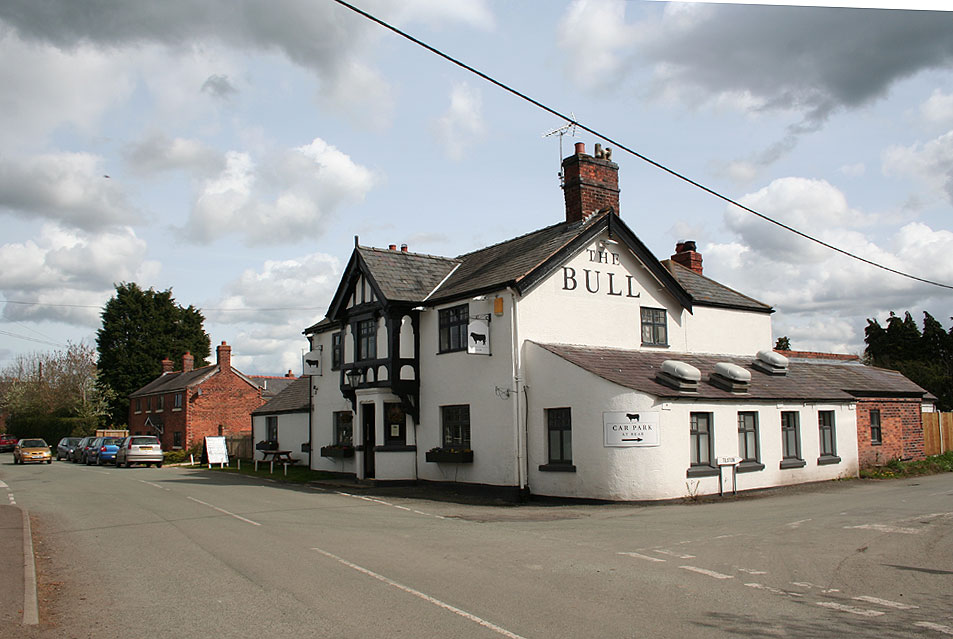
- The Bull Inn at Shocklach

- Location within Cheshire
- OS grid reference: SJ438491
- Civil parish: Shocklach Oviatt and District
- Unitary authority: Cheshire West and Chester
- Ceremonial county: Cheshire
- Region: North West
- Country: England
- Sovereign state: United Kingdom
- Post town: MALPAS
- Postcode district: SY14
- Dialling code: 01829
- UK Parliament: Chester South and Eddisbury
- Website: Shocklach website

Shocklach is a village in the civil parish of Shocklach Oviatt and District, in the Cheshire West and Chester district, in the county of Cheshire, England. Shocklach village is in the southwestern corner of Cheshire, approximately 1 kilometre (0.6 mi) from the border between Wales and England, the River Dee. The village lies between Wrexham, 10 kilometres (6 mi) to the west, and Nantwich, 21 kilometres (13 mi) to the east.

== Demographics ==
In the 1870s, Shocklach was described as being "on River Dee, 4½ miles N W. of Malpas, 2957 ac., pop. 325; the par. contains the townships of Shocklach Church, 1278 ac., pop. 135, and Shocklach Oviatt, 1848 ac., pop. 135".

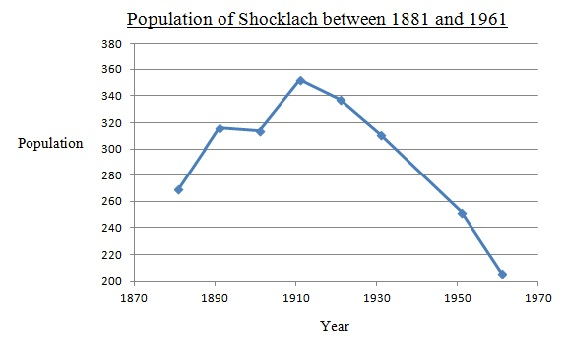
Population of Shocklach between 1881 and 1961

Shocklach had a population of 290 according to the 2011 census.

== History ==
According to the Concise Oxford Dictionary of English Place Names, the village name Shocklach means 'goblin stream'. The old English (according to the Oxford English Dictionary) for goblin "was scucca and lache which is a variant of letch which means wet ditch or bog or a stream flowing through boggy land; a muddy, ditch or hole". Similarly there is a village named Shobrooke in Devon, and the dictionary compares the original meaning of this name (goblin brook) with that of the village Shocklach.

== Occupational structure ==
Occupational structure of Shocklach in 1831

In 1831, the largest occupational category was 'labourers and servants' (70 people). The next category was 'employees and professionals' (22 people), followed by 'middling sorts' (20 people) and others (3 people). "Based on contemporary ideas than on modern definitions of social class: ‘middling sorts' combines small farmers not employing labourers with both masters and skilled workers in urban manufacturing and handicrafts".

== Landmarks and buildings ==
The "well-preserved" remains of an early post-Conquest motte castle lie on the northern edge of the parish, near the hamlet of Castletown. The castle is situated on what is thought to have been an ancient trackway, and was built by the Barons of Malpas in around 1100 to protect the region from frequent Welsh raids. The site is a Scheduled Ancient Monument.

St Edith's Church, standing in the middle of fields on its own a mile north of the village overlooking the River Dee and Wales, is a Grade I listed building. The church has a Norman doorway but the level of the ground outside is higher than the base of the door. In The Buildings of England: Cheshire, it is described thus: “a small Normal building – cf. the very crudely decorated S doorway with zigzag, rope, and lozenges broken by ninety degrees. Nave and chancel, and double bellcote... the odd W baptistery squeezed between the two buttresses looks a rustic C17 job”.

Another building standing close to St Edith's church is the 'Old Stable'. In spring 1993, a few enthusiasts from Shocklach managed to save from demolition an old and apparently insignificant building close to St Edith's church. Some older residents refer to the stable as "the old school" but there is little evidence for this. There are still remains of the building today. For example, there are the remains of an old fireplace in the south west corner of this interesting first floor.

== Biodiversity and the environment ==
Shocklach has a range of biodiversity. The 'Shocklach Oak' is "a wonderful tree which has a girth of 6.5 metres and has been recorder with the Woodland Trust in their Ancient Tree Record". The inside of the Oak is hollow, allowing generations of children to have played inside. The tree however is still healthy and continues to grow strong. The Shocklach village website provides a biodiversity survey, recording a vast range of plants and animals from March 2009 up to December 2012. The biodiversity survey recorded 138 species of flora (plant life) and 303 species of fauna (animal life). Species of fauna broken down include 59 species of birds, 11 species of mammals and 233 species of insects including 18 species of butterfly and 188 species of moth.

Shocklach's connections to biodiversity include having a Site of Biological Importance (SBI), a Site and an Area of Nature Conservation Value(SNCV and ANCV respectively) and lastly a Site of Special Scientific Interest (SSSI). Shocklach churchyard and meadows are a Grade B Site of Biological Importance and a Site of Nature Conservation value. These meadows are very important as it is "an ancient hay meadow comprising species-rich grassland which has not been affected by agricultural improvement". Cheshire Wildlife Trust (1996) undertook an inventory of grasslands which revealed "that the total area of unimproved neutral and acid grassland in Cheshire amounts to 2,865 hectares (1.36% of the surface area of Cheshire) in 284 separate sites". This shows how valuable the SBI (sites of biological importance) at Shocklach churchyard and meadows is.

In 2012, 300 native trees were planted in and around Shocklach, that "will replace the ageing oaks and ashes which form part of the landscape which most of us take for granted". For the Queen's Diamond Jubilee, 50 native oak trees were planted at Shocklach Primary School, St Edith's church and along the approach road to Shocklach. According to the village's website, "half survived and just before Christmas, 26 trees were replaced with strong, new saplings".

The River Dee is a major salmon and sea trout fishery: “Salmon are most often caught in the sections lying between Shocklach up to Bala Lake".

== See also ==
- Listed buildings in Church Shocklach
