= Listed buildings in Tilston =

Tilston is a civil parish in Cheshire West and Chester, England. It contains 13 buildings that are recorded in the National Heritage List for England as designated listed buildings. Of these, one is listed at Grade II*, the middle grade, and the others are at Grade II. Apart from the village of Tilston, the parish is rural. The listed buildings include the village church and associated structures, houses and farmhouses, a public house, and the village stocks.

== Key ==
Grade	Criteria
II*	Particularly important buildings of more than special interest
II	Buildings of national importance and special interest

== Buildings ==
Name and location	Photograph	Date	Notes	Grade
St Mary's Church; 53.0497°N 2.8109°W		15th century	The oldest part of the church is the tower. The Leche Chapel on the north side is dated 1659, and the rest of the church results from a major restoration by John Douglas in 1877–79. The church is built in sandstone with a tiled roof, and consists of a nave with a north doorway, a chancel, a north chapel and vestry, and a west tower.	II*
The Close; 53.0567°N 2.8092°W		17th century	The house was extended in the late 19th century with a north wing and other alterations in the style of the 17th century. It is a brick house with false timber-framed gables. The house has two storeys and an asymmetrical façade with three gables topped by five-spiked finials, the left gable projecting to form an L-shaped plan. The windows are casements. At the rear, and integral to the house, is a three-storey water tower with a pyramidal roof surmounted by a weather vane. Inside the house are inglenooks.	II
Garage/workshop; 53.05444°N 2.81046°W		Mid- to late 17th century	This originated as a cottage. It is timber-framed with brick nogging and some brickwork. The building is in a single storey, and has a three-bay front. It has a corrugated iron roof. There are no windows.	II
Little Hill Farmhouse; 53.05174°N 2.79380°W	—	Late 17th century	The farmhouse is timber-framed with brick nogging and stone infill on a stone plinth. It has a slate roof. The farmhouse is in two storeys and has a two-window front.	II
Gates, gate piers and walls, St Mary's Church; 53.04978°N 2.81123°W		1687	The gate piers are in sandstone. They are square with a cornice and ball finials. The churchyard walls are also in sandstone, and are inscribed with the date 1688. The iron gates date from the late 18th century.	II
Well House Antiques; 53.05158°N 2.79848°W		1723	Originating as an inn, this was later converted for use as a house and a shop. It is built in brick on a rendered plinth, and has a slate roof. To the rear is a stable block. The windows are sashes. The doorway on the north side has a pedimented canopy.	II
Carden Arms; 53.05707°N 2.80885°W		Mid-18th century	Originating as an inn, later used as a public house and restaurant, this is a pebbledashed building on a rendered plinth, with a slate roof and a tiled ridge. It is in two storeys, and has a front of two blocks, each with two bays, the left block projecting slightly forwards. There is a canted bay window in the right block. Most of the windows are sashes, with some casements in the north wall and at the rear.	II
Ivy Dene; 53.05628°N 2.80577°W	—	Mid-18th century	The house was altered in the 19th century, including replacing the façade. It is in brick on a stone plinth, and has a slate roof with a tiled ridge. The house is rectangular, it in two storeys with attics, and has a three-bay front. At the top of the house is a stone parapet and a fluted frieze, and in the central bay is a gable. The windows are sashes. The porch has fluted pilasters and a broken pediment.	II
Old Rectory; 53.0508°N 2.8100°W		Mid- to late 18th century	The Rectory was altered in the 19th century. It is in brick with a slate roof and a tiled ridge. The building is rectangular with a double-pile plan, and is in two storeys. The windows are a mix of casements and sashes.	II
Lowcross Farmhouse; 53.0476°N 2.7932°W		Late 18th to early 19th century	The farmhouse is built in brick on a stone plinth and has a slate roof with a tiled ridge. It is in two storeys with attics, and has a symmetrical three-bay front. The windows are casements, and above the door is a fanlight.	II
Tilston Cottage; 53.05654°N 2.80759°W		c. 1810	The house was later extended to the rear. It is in rendered brick on a stone plinth with a slate roof. The house has two storeys and a symmetrical three-bay front. The outer bays are bowed, and the roof curves over them. The windows are casements. The doorway has a Gothic arch, and contains three Gothic-shaped windows.	II
House adjacent to Well House Antiques; 53.0517°N 2.7984°W		Mid-19th century	The house is built in stuccoed brick and has a slate roof. It is in two storeys, and has a three-bay front. The windows are sashes, and above the door is a fanlight.	II
Stocks; 53.05688°N 2.80838°W		Undated	The stocks are in red sandstone. They are three-sided with square piers at the front holding wooden stocks. Behind these is a two-stepped seat.	II
