= Site of Biological Importance =

A Site of Biological Importance (or SBI) is one of the non-statutory designations used locally by the Greater Manchester, Cheshire and Staffordshire County Councils in England to protect locally valued sites of biological diversity which are described generally as Local Wildlife Sites by the UK Government. The term SBI should not be confused with Site of Special Scientific Interest.

The guidance from Her Majesty's Government concerning Local Sites states that:

The series of non-statutory Local Sites seek to ensure, in the public interest, the conservation, maintenance and enhancement of species, habitats, geological and geomorphological features of substantive nature conservation value

SBIs have no legal protection, but do receive some protection through different policies, and they must be taken into consideration by the local authority when planning applications affect the site. Sites are selected using a number of attributes that include; habitat type, diversity and rarity of the species present, and the site's naturalness.
