= Listed buildings in Stretton, Cheshire West and Chester =

Stretton is a civil parish in Cheshire West and Chester, England. It contains seven listed buildings that are recorded in the National Heritage List for England. Of these, two are listed at Grade II*, the middle of the three grades, and the others are at Grade II, the lowest grade. The listed buildings consist of a country house and its garden wall, a smaller house, a farmhouse and associated barn, and a watermill that has been converted into a museum with its associated former stable.

== Key ==
Grade	Criteria
II*	Particularly important buildings of more than special interest
II	Buildings of national importance and special interest

== Buildings ==
Name and location	Photograph	Date	Notes	Grade
Stretton Watermill; 53.07159°N 2.81561°W		16th century	The watermill was extended during the following centuries, and has been converted into a museum. It is in sandstone on a plinth, with weatherboarding, a brick extension at the rear, and a grey slate roof. There are two storeys and an attic grain store, and on the front is a divided oak door, and casement windows with oak shutters. To the right is an external waterwheel in timber, and there are stone steps leading up to the mill dam, and a millrace with a sluice. Inside the mill is working machinery, including another waterwheel.	II*
Old Hall Farmhouse; 53.07004°N 2.82453°W	—	17th century	The house, which was extended in the 19th century, is in brown brick with dentil bands, and a grey slate roof. It consists of a cross-wing on the right with two storeys and an attic and a shaped gable, a range to the left with one storey and an attic, and in the junction is a two-storey porch with a shaped gable. The doorway and the windows, which are casements, have camber-arched heads.	II
Barn and outbuilding, Old Hall Farmhouse; 53.06965°N 2.82487°W		17th century	The barn is timber framed with brick nogging, partly rebuilt in brick, on a sandstone plinth and bedrock, and has some weatherboarding and a thatched roof. It contains a doorway, loading doors, and diamond-shaped vents. At the rear is a 19th-century extension in brick with an external stone stair.	II
Stretton Lower Hall; 53.07210°N 2.82393°W		1660	The house, which was extended in the 19th century, is in brown brick with dentil bands, and a grey slate roof with shaped gables on the front and coped gables elsewhere. There are two storeys and a symmetrical front of three bays, the outer bays gabled. In the centre is a doorway, and the windows are casements. On the sides are large projecting chimneys.	II
Garden wall, Stretton Hall; 53.06828°N 2.82765°W	—	18th century (or earlier)	The wall surrounds three sides of the garden, and is in red sandstone. It is mainly about 1 metre (3 ft 3 in) high, rising on the northwest side to 3 metres (9.8 ft) and buttressed, and dropped in two parts to allow for views of the Dee valley.	II
Stretton Hall and stable 53.06888°N 2.82689°W		1763	A country house in red brick with a buff sandstone basement, stone dressings, bands, a moulded cornice, a parapet, and a grey slate roof. There are two storeys, basements and attics, a symmetrical front of five bays, the middle three bays canted, and flanking single-storey single-bay wings. In the centre, divided curved steps lead up to a doorway with a pediment on consoles. The windows are sashes in architraves, in the basement they are horizontally sliding, and at the rear of the wings are Venetian windows with Tuscan pilasters. The stable wing is in red sandstone and red brick with a grey slate roof.	II*
Stretton Mill Stable; 53.07173°N 2.81580°W		1813	The stable for Stretton Watermill, later an information centre, it is in sandstone with a grey slate roof. There are two storeys and a rear extension. The building contains a broad camber-arched doorway with a datestone above.	II
