= Chester (non-metropolitan district) =

Local government district in England

Coordinates: 53°11′N 2°53′W

City of Chester
- Area
  - 1974: 110,729 acres (448.10 km^{2})
- Population
  - 1973: 116,820
  - 1992: 119,500
  - 2001: 118,210
- History
  - Origin: Chester County Borough; Chester Rural District; Tarvin Rural District
  - Created: 1 April 1974
  - Abolished: 31 March 2009
  - Succeeded by: Cheshire West and Chester
- Status: Non-metropolitan district, city
- ONS code: 13UB
- Government: Chester City Council
  - HQ: Chester
  - Motto: Antiqui Colant Antiquum Dierum (Let the Ancients worship the Ancient of Days)
- Subdivisions
  - Type: Civil parishes

Chester was a non-metropolitan local government district of Cheshire, England, from 1974 to 2009. It had the status of a city and a borough, and the local authority was called Chester City Council.

Apart from Chester itself, which was the principal settlement, the district covered a large rural area. Other settlements included Malpas and Tarvin.

== History ==
The district was formed on 1 April 1974, under the Local Government Act 1972, by the merger of the existing city and county borough of Chester with the Chester Rural District and Tarvin Rural District. It was a non-metropolitan district, with county-level services for the area provided by Cheshire County Council.

The new district was awarded borough status from its creation, allowing the chairman of the council to take the title of mayor. The city status which had previously attached to the old county borough of Chester was extended to cover the enlarged district on 28 May 1974, a few weeks after the changes came into effect, allowing the council to call itself Chester City Council.

In 2006 the Department for Communities and Local Government considered reorganising Cheshire's administrative structure as part of the 2009 structural changes to local government in England. The decision to merge Vale Royal with the districts of Chester and Ellesmere Port and Neston to create a single unitary authority was announced on 25 July 2007, following a consultation period in which a proposal to create a single Cheshire unitary authority was rejected.

The Chester district was abolished on 31 March 2009, with the area becoming part of the new unitary authority of Cheshire West and Chester from 1 April 2009. Chester's city charter is retained through the appointment of charter trustees.

=== Lord mayoralty and shrievalty ===
The office of mayor of Chester was continued in 1974 by virtue of the charter, the title being borne by the chairman of the council. The mayor of Chester had, since at least 1528, enjoyed the additional honorific title of "Admiral of the Dee". The title was confirmed by letters patent dated 15 May 1974. In 1992, as part of celebrations of the fortieth anniversary of the accession of Elizabeth II, the mayor's title was raised to Lord Mayor of Chester by letters patent dated 10 March 1992.

Under the charter granted in 1974 the new council was permitted to continue to appoint any traditional "officers of dignity" that the predecessor city and county borough had been entitled to appoint. Accordingly, in June 1974 it was decided to continue the office of Sheriff of Chester that dated from the early twelfth century.

The offices of lord mayor and sheriff of Chester were held by serving councillors, and there was an annual rotation of the posts between the three main parties.

=== Coat of arms ===
In 1977 the city council was regranted a "differenced" version of the sixteenth century arms of the predecessor Corporation of the City and County Borough of Chester. The historic arms of Chester was based on the Royal Arms of England (three golden lions on a red shield) combined with three gold wheatsheaves on blue of the Earldom of Chester. A gold border bearing acorns was added to the arms to represent the rural areas added in 1974. The crest of the corporation was a depiction of the city sword. To this was added two branches of oak for the two rural districts combined with the county borough. The supporters of the city arms were a gold lion representing England and a white wolf for Hugh Lupus, 1st Earl of Chester. In 1977 they were altered slightly by the addition of red castles hanging about their necks. The Latin motto was Antiqui Colant Antiquum Dierum or Let the ancients worship the ancient of days.

== Civil parishes ==
Chester district contained a comparatively large number of civil parishes. There were 46 parish councils operating in the district in 2008, some of which were grouped parish councils covering more than one civil parish. Some smaller parishes were not covered any parish council, leaving parish level representation to be administered through a parish meeting.

- Agden
- Aldersey
- Aldford
- Ashton Hayes
- Bache
- Backford
- Barrow
- Barton
- Beeston
- Bickley
- Bradley
- Bridge Trafford
- Broxton
- Bruen Stapleford
- Buerton
- Burton
- Burwardsley
- Caldecott
- Capenhurst
- Carden
- Caughall
- Chester Castle
- Chidlow
- Chorlton
- Chorlton by Backford
- Chowley
- Christleton
- Church Shocklach
- Churton by Aldford
- Churton by Farndon
- Churton Heath
- Claverton
- Clotton Hoofield
- Clutton
- Coddington
- Cotton Abbotts
- Cotton Edmunds
- Crewe by Farndon
- Croughton
- Cuddington
- Dodleston
- Duckington
- Duddon
- Dunham on the Hill
- Eaton
- Eccleston
- Edge
- Edgerley
- Elton
- Farndon
- Foulk Stapleford
- Golborne Bellow
- Golborne David
- Grafton
- Great Boughton
- Guilden Sutton
- Hampton
- Handley
- Hapsford
- Harthill
- Hatton
- Hockenhull
- Hoole Village
- Horton by Malpas
- Horton cum Peel
- Huntington
- Huxley
- Iddinshall
- Kelsall
- Kings Marsh
- Larkton
- Lea Newbold
- Lea by Backford
- Ledsham
- Little Stanney
- Littleton
- Lower Kinnerton
- Macefen
- Malpas (town)
- Marlston cum Lache
- Mickle Trafford
- Mollington
- Moston
- Mouldsworth
- Newton by Malpas
- Newton by Tattenhall
- Oldcastle
- Overton
- Picton
- Poulton
- Prior's Heys
- Puddington
- Pulford
- Rowton
- Saighton
- Saughall
- Shocklach Oviatt
- Shotwick
- Shotwick Park
- Stockton
- Stoke
- Stretton
- Tarvin
- Tattenhall
- Thornton le Moors
- Threapwood
- Tilston
- Tilstone Fearnall
- Tiverton
- Tushingham cum Grindley
- Upton by Chester
- Waverton
- Wervin
- Wigland
- Willington
- Wimbolds Trafford
- Woodbank
- Wychough

Map of civil parishes within the former City of Chester district

The main built-up part of Chester was an unparished area, corresponding to the area of the former county borough. One anomaly was that there was a small civil parish just covering the area around Chester Castle, which was surrounded by the unparished area. This was the civil parish of Chester Castle, which had not been part of the pre-1974 Chester County Borough, but had been a detached part of the Chester Rural District.

== Political control ==
The city of Chester had been a county borough, independent from any county council, from 1889 to 1974. The first elections to the enlarged district created under the Local Government Act 1972 were held in 1973, initially operating as a shadow authority until the new arrangements came into effect on 1 April 1974. Political control of the council from 1974 until its abolition in 2009 was held by the following parties:

Party in control	Years
Conservative	1974–1986
No overall control	1986–2007
Conservative	2007–2009

=== Leadership ===
The leaders of the council were:

Councillor	Party	From	To
Cecil Eimerl	Conservative	1 Apr 1974	9 May 1976
Hugh Jones	Conservative	19 May 1976	May 1979
Derek Owens-Kaye	Conservative	May 1979	May 1985
Cecil Eimerl	Conservative	May 1985	21 May 1986
John Bramall	Conservative	21 May 1986	May 1989
Richard Short	Conservative	May 1989	May 1990
John Price	Labour	21 May 1990	May 1991
Richard Short	Conservative	May 1991	20 May 1992
No leader		20 May 1992	Jan 1993
Richard Short	Conservative	Jan 1993	May 1993
No leader		May 1993	May 1995
John Price	Labour	May 1995	14 May 2003
David Evans	Liberal Democrats	14 May 2003	2006
Paul Roberts	Liberal Democrats	2006	2007
Margaret Parker	Conservative	2007	2009

== Premises ==
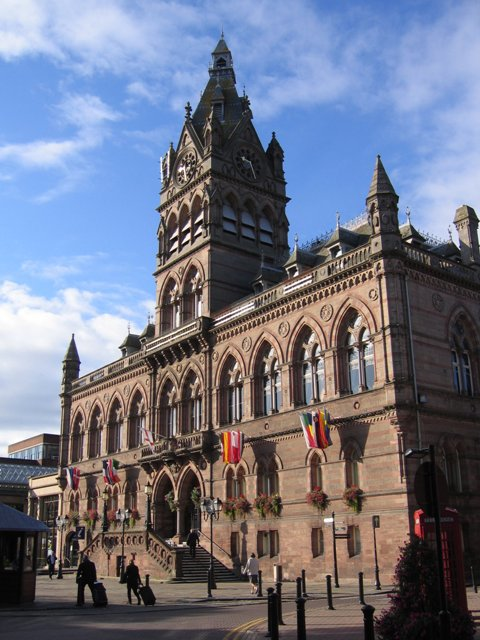
Chester Town Hall, Northgate Street, with The Forum shopping centre and municipal offices in background to its left.

The council held its meetings at Chester Town Hall, and had its main offices at The Forum on Northgate Street, Chester, being offices above a shopping centre adjoining the Town Hall. The offices at The Forum had been opened on 4 April 1973 for the old city council when it was a county borough, but in anticipation of the reforms due to come into effect in 1974.

== Council elections ==
- 1973 Chester City Council election
- 1976 Chester City Council election
- 1979 Chester City Council election (New ward boundaries)
- 1980 Chester City Council election
- 1982 Chester City Council election
- 1983 Chester City Council election
- 1984 Chester City Council election
- 1986 Chester City Council election
- 1987 Chester City Council election
- 1988 Chester City Council election (City boundary changes took place but the number of seats remained the same)
- 1990 Chester City Council election
- 1991 Chester City Council election
- 1992 Chester City Council election
- 1994 Chester City Council election
- 1995 Chester City Council election
- 1996 Chester City Council election
- 1998 Chester City Council election
- 1999 Chester City Council election (New ward boundaries)
- 2000 Chester City Council election
- 2002 Chester City Council election
- 2003 Chester City Council election
- 2004 Chester City Council election
- 2006 Chester City Council election
- 2007 Chester City Council election

=== 2006 Election ===
The Conservative Party gained 5 seats in Lache, Newton St. Michael's, Handbridge, Elton and Upton Grange. Labour lost three seats to the Conservatives, and avoided losing Boughton and City to the Conservatives, and College to the Liberal Democrats. The Liberal Democrats lost two seats to the Conservatives, and only avoided losing a safe seat, Vicars Cross, to the Conservatives. In addition, a Liberal Democrat Councillor (Jeff Clarke, Waverton) defected to the Conservatives. The Conservatives also won a by-election in Autumn 2006, taking another seat from the Liberal Democrats.

=== 2007 Election ===
The Conservative party gained 7 seats in Lache, Newton Brook, Huntington, Tattenhall, Upton Grange, Kelsall and Boughton Heath. They also regained Christleton after the seat had been vacant for four months. The Liberal Democrats were defeated in five seats, Labour in one, and one long-serving Independent (Doug Haynes, Tattenhall) was beaten. Labour were beaten into fourth place in one ward (Malpas) by the English Democrats. The Liberal Democrats narrowly avoided finishing in fourth place in Blacon Hall and Blacon Lodge. Labour held College by just 7 votes, with the Liberal Democrats in second place.

=== 2008 Election ===
The 2008 elections were cancelled due to local government re-organisation. Elections to a shadow Cheshire West and Chester (CWC) unitary authority were instead held. This meant that councillors elected in 2004 served for an additional year before the city council was disbanded. Therefore, the Conservatives remained the governing party until April 2009, when the new CWC Council replaced the city council.

== Results maps ==
1980 results map

1982 results map

1983 results map

1984 results map

1986 results map

1987 results map

1988 results map

1990 results map

1991 results map

1992 results map

1994 results map

1995 results map

1996 results map

1998 results map

1999 results map

2000 results map

2002 results map

2003 results map

2004 results map

2006 results map

2007 results map

=== By-election results ===
Vicars Cross By-Election 1 May 1997
Party	Candidate	Votes	%	±%
Liberal Democrats	Kenneth Holding	1,466	42.5	−8.3
Labour	Sara Barnsley	1,151	33.3	−0.3
Conservative	Peter Moore-Dutton	834	24.2	+8.7
Majority		315	9.2	
Turnout		3,451		
Liberal Democrats hold		Swing		

College By-Election 26 June 1997
Party	Candidate	Votes	%	±%
Labour		664	74.9	+6.3
Conservative		120	13.5	−4.6
Independent		53	6.0	+6.0
Liberal Democrats		50	5.6	−2.5
Majority		544	61.4	
Turnout		887	16.0	
Labour hold		Swing		

Newton Brook By-Election 21 September 2000
Party	Candidate	Votes	%	±%
Liberal Democrats	Robert Jordan?	572	55.1	+11.2
Conservative		401	38.6	−5.6
Labour		65	6.3	−5.6
Majority		171	16.5	
Turnout		1,038	33.8	
Liberal Democrats hold		Swing		

College By-Election 7 June 2001
Party	Candidate	Votes	%	±%
Labour		1,150	51.8	−2.8
Liberal Democrats		570	25.6	+6.0
Conservative		502	22.6	−3.2
Majority		580	26.2	
Turnout		2,222		
Labour hold		Swing		

Hoole Groves By-Election 7 June 2001
Party	Candidate	Votes	%	±%
Labour	Alex Black	886	41.4	+12.9
Liberal Democrats		811	37.9	−20.2
Conservative		406	19.1	+7.6
Independent		35	1.6	+0.7
Majority		75	3.5	
Turnout		2,103		
Labour gain from Liberal Democrats		Swing		

Malpas By-Election 6 September 2001
Party	Candidate	Votes	%	±%
Conservative	Keith Ebben	482	54.3	−19.5
Liberal Democrats		405	45.7	+31.4
Majority		77	8.6	
Turnout		887	20.8	
Conservative gain from Independent		Swing		

Blacon Hall By-Election 1 August 2002
Party	Candidate	Votes	%	±%
Labour	Alan Tushingham	592	77.1	+2.3
Independent		119	15.5	+15.5
Liberal Democrats		57	7.4	+7.4
Majority		473	61.6	
Turnout		768	13.8	
Labour hold		Swing		

Blacon Hall By-Election 14 August 2003
Party	Candidate	Votes	%	±%
Labour	Norman Stainthorp	714	66.2	+0.2
Conservative	Charles Isaac	204	18.9	+5.8
Liberal Democrats		160	14.8	+8.2
Majority		510	47.3	
Turnout		1,078	20.0	
Labour hold		Swing		

Boughton By-Election 29 July 2004
Party	Candidate	Votes	%	±%
Labour	Susan Atkinson	427	44.9	−7.9
Conservative	Mark Williams	377	39.6	+11.0
Liberal Democrats	Joanne Crotty (?)	147	15.5	+4.5
Majority		50	5.3	
Turnout		951	35.0	
Labour hold		Swing		

Blacon Lodge By-Election 18 November 2004
Party	Candidate	Votes	%	±%
Labour	Ethel Price	505	62.9	+4.1
Conservative	John Burke ?	243	30.3	+6.2
Liberal Democrats		55	6.8	−10.3
Majority		262	32.6	
Turnout		803	21.5	
Labour hold		Swing		

Hoole All Saints By-Election 5 May 2005
Party	Candidate	Votes	%	±%
Liberal Democrats	Barry Sullivan	765	51.2	−8.6
Labour		496	33.2	+10.9
Conservative		233	15.6	+7.0
Majority		269	18.0	
Turnout		1,494	65.0	
Liberal Democrats hold		Swing		

Curzon & Westminster By-Election 27 October 2005
Party	Candidate	Votes	%	±%
Conservative	Max Drury	875	63.8	−1.1
Liberal Democrats	Allan Stobie	258	18.8	+1.9
Labour	Alexandra Tate	238	17.4	−0.8
Majority		617	45.0	
Turnout		1,371	41.0	
Conservative hold		Swing		

Newton St. Michaels By-Election 26 October 2006
Party	Candidate	Votes	%	±%
Conservative	Adrian Walmsley	518	41.9	−0.1
Liberal Democrats	Molly Hale	497	40.2	+8.1
Labour	Alex Black	197	15.9	−2.9
Green	Diana Wilderspin-Jones	24	1.9	−5.2
Majority		21	1.7	
Turnout		1,236	46.2	
Conservative gain from Liberal Democrats		Swing		
