= Claverton =

Claverton may refer to the following places in England:

- Claverton, Somerset
- Claverton, Cheshire
