= 1996 Chester City Council election =

1996 English local election

← 1995	2 May 1996	1998 →

20 out of 60 seats to Chester City Council 31 seats needed for a majority

	First party	Second party
Party	Labour	Liberal Democrats
Last election	23 seats, 45.3%	16 seats, 23.6%
Seats won	9	7
Seats after	27	18
Seat change	▲4	▲2
Popular vote	13,645	7,515
Percentage	45.5%	25.1%
Swing	▲0.2%	▲1.5%
	Third party	Fourth party
Party	Conservative	Independent
Last election	13 seats, 26.8%	2 seats, 3.9%
Seats won	3	1
Seats after	13	2
Seat change	▼6	Steady
Popular vote	8,160	582
Percentage	27.2%	1.9%
Swing	▲0.4%	▼2.0%
- Winner of each seat at the 1996 Chester City Council election
Council control before election
No overall control
Council control after election
No overall control

The 1996 Chester City Council election took place on 2 May 1996 to elect members of Chester City Council in Cheshire, England. This was on the same day as other local elections.

== Summary ==
=== Election result ===
1996 Chester City Council election
Party	This election			Full council			This election		
Party	Seats	Net	Seats %	Other	Total	Total %	Votes	Votes %	+/−
Labour	9	▲4	45.0	18	27	45.0	13,645	45.5	+0.2
Liberal Democrats	7	▲2	35.0	11	18	30.0	7,515	25.1	+1.5
Conservative	3	▼6	15.0	10	13	21.7	8,160	27.2	+0.4
Independent	1	Steady	5.0	1	2	3.3	582	1.9	–2.0
Ratepayer	0	Steady	0.0	0	0	0.0	87	0.3	±0.0

== Ward results ==
=== Blacon Hall ===
Blacon Hall
Party	Candidate	Votes	%	±%
Labour	J. Randall*	992	86.2	–2.9
Conservative	C. Isaac	112	9.7	+2.6
Liberal Democrats	H. Chrusciezl	47	4.1	+0.3
Majority		880	76.5	–5.5
Turnout		1,151	28.6	–2.0
Registered electors		4,022		
Labour hold		Swing	▼2.8	

=== Boughton ===
Boughton
Party	Candidate	Votes	%	±%
Labour	J. Vernon*	679	70.5	+13.2
Conservative	P. Power	192	19.9	–9.2
Liberal Democrats	P. Brett	92	9.6	–4.1
Majority		487	50.6	+22.4
Turnout		963	37.6	–4.4
Registered electors		2,560		
Labour hold		Swing	▲11.2	

=== Christleton ===
Christleton
Party	Candidate	Votes	%	±%
Conservative	B. Bailey*	872	52.7	+5.4
Labour	S. Wardman	639	38.6	+5.7
Liberal Democrats	R. Yakan	144	8.7	–11.1
Majority		233	14.1	–0.3
Turnout		1,655	43.7	–2.3
Registered electors		3,790		
Conservative hold		Swing	▼0.2	

=== College ===
College
Party	Candidate	Votes	%	±%
Labour	C. Russell*	1,162	68.6	+1.1
Conservative	S. Barclay	307	18.1	–1.1
Liberal Democrats	J. Indermaur	137	8.1	+0.7
Ratepayer	D. Taylor	87	5.1	–0.7
Majority		855	50.5	+2.2
Turnout		1,693	37.0	–0.6
Registered electors		4,573		
Labour hold		Swing	▲1.1	

=== Curzon ===
Curzon
Party	Candidate	Votes	%	±%
Labour	E. Mercer	792	56.0	+2.9
Conservative	J. Price*	546	38.6	+1.6
Liberal Democrats	G. Ralph	77	5.4	–4.5
Majority		246	17.4	+1.3
Turnout		1,415	49.6	–10.4
Registered electors		2,852		
Labour gain from Conservative		Swing	▲0.7	

=== Dee Point ===
Dee Point
Party	Candidate	Votes	%	±%
Labour	J. Featherston*	1,007	83.4	+0.2
Conservative	J. Jaworzyn	147	12.2	+0.8
Liberal Democrats	K. Prydderch	53	4.4	–1.0
Majority		860	71.3	–0.6
Turnout		1,207	30.2	+0.2
Registered electors		4,003		
Labour hold		Swing	▼0.3	

=== Farndon ===
Farndon
Party	Candidate	Votes	%	±%
Liberal Democrats	P. Roberts	397	46.5	N/A
Conservative	S. Rowlandson*	380	44.5	–33.5
Labour	S. Floyd	76	8.9	–13.1
Majority		17	2.0	N/A
Turnout		853	49.8	+9.5
Registered electors		1,712		
Liberal Democrats gain from Conservative				

=== Grosvenor ===
Grosvenor
Party	Candidate	Votes	%	±%
Labour	I. Evans	1,110	52.8	+3.5
Conservative	P. Connolly*	764	36.3	+1.8
Liberal Democrats	T. Crossland	229	10.9	–5.3
Majority		346	16.5	+1.7
Turnout		2,103	48.9	–3.1
Registered electors		4,296		
Labour gain from Conservative		Swing	▲0.9	

=== Hoole ===
Hoole
Party	Candidate	Votes	%	±%
Liberal Democrats	J. Nuttall	1,132	50.4	–2.6
Labour	D. Kelly	1,011	45.0	–2.0
Conservative	G. Beattie	105	4.7	N/A
Majority		121	5.4	–0.7
Turnout		2,248	48.2	+0.3
Registered electors		4,665		
Liberal Democrats hold		Swing	▼0.3	

=== Malpas ===
Malpas
Party	Candidate	Votes	%	±%
Independent	C. Higgie*	508	49.1	N/A
Conservative	R. Clutton	352	34.0	–28.7
Labour	C. Byrne	147	14.2	–13.1
Liberal Democrats	U. Gerstl	28	2.7	–7.4
Majority		156	15.1	N/A
Turnout		1,035	34.1	–1.7
Registered electors		3,038		
Independent hold				

=== Newton ===
Newton
Party	Candidate	Votes	%	±%
Liberal Democrats	R. Biddle	849	46.8	+3.4
Conservative	J. Ebo*	506	27.9	–0.2
Labour	W. Megarrell	460	25.3	–3.2
Majority		343	18.9	+3.9
Turnout		1,815	46.2	+0.5
Registered electors		3,931		
Liberal Democrats gain from Conservative		Swing	▲1.8	

=== Plas Newton ===
Plas Newton
Party	Candidate	Votes	%	±%
Liberal Democrats	T. Ralph*	775	45.9	–10.1
Labour	G. Craig	708	41.9	–2.1
Conservative	H. Wood	205	12.1	N/A
Majority		67	4.0	–8.0
Turnout		1,688	46.3	+1.1
Registered electors		3,465		
Liberal Democrats hold		Swing	▼4.0	

=== Saughall ===
Saughall
Party	Candidate	Votes	%	±%
Conservative	A. Coughlan*	548	37.3	–1.6
Labour	A. Porter	503	34.2	+3.7
Liberal Democrats	J. Pemberton*	419	28.5	–2.1
Majority		45	3.1	–5.2
Turnout		1,470	49.4	–2.8
Registered electors		2,974		
Conservative hold		Swing	▼2.6	

=== Sealand ===
Sealand
Party	Candidate	Votes	%	±%
Labour	R. Bott*	1,038	78.7	–2.0
Conservative	A. Van Der Zwan	187	14.2	+3.9
Liberal Democrats	B. Yakan	94	7.1	–2.0
Majority		851	64.5	–5.9
Turnout		1,319	35.0	–2.0
Registered electors		3,764		
Labour hold		Swing	▼3.0	

=== Tattenhall ===
Tattenhall
Party	Candidate	Votes	%	±%
Conservative	M. Jones*	448	48.3	+28.3
Liberal Democrats	M. Richardson	294	31.7	+17.6
Labour	A. Pegrum	186	20.0	N/A
Majority		154	16.6	N/A
Turnout		928	35.3	–6.7
Registered electors		2,632		
Conservative hold		Swing	▲5.4	

=== Upton Grange ===
Upton Grange
Party	Candidate	Votes	%	±%
Liberal Democrats	C. Bain*	792	55.9	–6.2
Conservative	J. Cliffe	370	26.1	+5.1
Labour	J. Baker	255	18.0	+1.2
Majority		422	29.8	–11.3
Turnout		1,417	44.7	–5.3
Registered electors		3,171		
Liberal Democrats hold		Swing	▼5.7	

=== Upton Heath ===
Upton Heath
Party	Candidate	Votes	%	±%
Labour	S. Duffus	1,036	52.5	+4.0
Conservative	N. Fitton*	648	32.8	+2.6
Liberal Democrats	N. McGlinchey	217	11.0	–6.5
Independent	J. Starkey	74	3.7	±0.0
Majority		388	19.6	+1.3
Turnout		1,975	49.2	–4.8
Registered electors		4,017		
Labour gain from Conservative		Swing	▲0.7	

=== Vicars Cross ===
Vicars Cross
Party	Candidate	Votes	%	±%
Liberal Democrats	K. Holding*	975	50.8	–4.2
Labour	R. Harrison	645	33.6	+5.7
Conservative	C. Dodman	298	15.5	–1.6
Majority		330	17.2	–10.0
Turnout		1,918	46.3	+2.0
Registered electors		4,146		
Liberal Democrats hold		Swing	▼5.0	

=== Waverton ===
Waverton
Party	Candidate	Votes	%	±%
Liberal Democrats	C. Walley*	568	69.1	+19.7
Conservative	H. Broad-Davies	184	22.4	–21.1
Labour	C. Davies	70	8.5	+1.3
Majority		384	46.7	+40.8
Turnout		822	57.0	–4.3
Registered electors		1,442		
Liberal Democrats hold		Swing	▲20.4	

=== Westminster ===
Westminster
Party	Candidate	Votes	%	±%
Labour	S. Davies	1,129	48.8	–4.3
Conservative	R. Short*	989	42.7	+15.8
Liberal Democrats	H. Prydderch	196	8.5	N/A
Majority		140	6.1	–20.1
Turnout		2,314	45.3	–3.0
Registered electors		5,111		
Labour gain from Conservative		Swing	▼10.1	
