= 2004 Chester City Council election =

2004 English local election

← 2003	10 June 2004	2006 →

20 out of 60 seats to Chester City Council 31 seats needed for a majority

	First party	Second party
Party	Liberal Democrats	Conservative
Last election	21 seats, 30.3%	18 seats, 33.2%
Seats won	9	8
Seats after	22	20
Seat change	▲1	▲2
Popular vote	10,566	12,801
Percentage	32.7%	39.6%
Swing	▲2.4%	▲6.4%
	Third party	Fourth party
Party	Labour	Independent
Last election	20 seats, 28.4%	1 seat, 5.4%
Seats won	3	0
Seats after	17	1
Seat change	▼3	Steady
Popular vote	8,466	348
Percentage	26.2%	1.1%
Swing	▼2.2%	▼4.3%
- Winner of each seat at the 2004 Chester City Council election
Council control before election
No overall control
Council control after election
No overall control

The 2004 Chester City Council election took place on 10 June 2004 to elect members of Chester City Council in Cheshire, England. This was on the same day as other local elections.

== Summary ==
=== Election result ===
2004 Chester City Council election
Party	This election			Full council			This election		
Party	Seats	Net	Seats %	Other	Total	Total %	Votes	Votes %	+/−
Liberal Democrats	9	▲1	45.0	13	22	36.7	10,566	32.7	+2.4
Conservative	8	▲2	40.0	12	20	33.3	12,801	39.6	+6.4
Labour	3	▼3	15.0	14	17	28.3	8,466	26.2	–2.2
Independent	0	Steady	0.0	1	1	1.7	348	1.1	–4.3
Green	0	Steady	0.0	0	0	0.0	172	0.5	–0.4

== Ward results ==
=== Blacon Hall ===
Blacon Hall
Party	Candidate	Votes	%	±%
Labour	Judith Stainthorp	1,098	57.9	–8.1
Conservative	Charles Isaac	478	25.2	+12.1
Liberal Democrats	Sandra Clyne	319	16.8	+10.2
Majority		620	32.7	–19.0
Turnout		1,895	36.6	+15.3
Registered electors		5,185		
Labour hold		Swing	▼10.1	

=== Blacon Lodge ===
Blacon Lodge
Party	Candidate	Votes	%	±%
Labour	Fiona Beddows	823	58.8	–14.9
Conservative	John Burke	338	24.1	N/A
Liberal Democrats	David Simpson	239	17.1	+5.7
Majority		485	34.6	–24.1
Turnout		1,400	37.3	+17.9
Registered electors		3,752		
Labour hold				

=== Boughton Heath ===
Boughton Heath
Party	Candidate	Votes	%	±%
Liberal Democrats	James Latham*	927	50.6	–2.6
Conservative	Jill Houlbrook	688	37.6	+0.3
Labour	Ethel Price	217	11.8	+2.4
Majority		239	13.0	–2.9
Turnout		1,832	59.6	+16.0
Registered electors		3,076		
Liberal Democrats hold		Swing	▼1.5	

=== City & St. Annes ===
City & St. Annes
Party	Candidate	Votes	%	±%
Conservative	Edward Jonas	438	40.5	+13.0
Labour	Martyn Delaney	418	38.7	–17.4
Liberal Democrats	Gillian Jordan	225	20.8	+9.0
Majority		20	1.9	N/A
Turnout		1,081	39.9	+11.0
Registered electors		2,707		
Conservative gain from Labour		Swing	▲15.2	

=== College ===
College
Party	Candidate	Votes	%	±%
Liberal Democrats	David Mead	507	32.9	+8.0
Conservative	Felicity McNae	432	28.0	+5.7
Labour	Stephen Davies*	431	28.0	–15.0
Green	Hugh Bromley	172	11.2	+1.5
Majority		75	4.9	N/A
Turnout		1,542	33.9	+14.7
Registered electors		4,546		
Liberal Democrats gain from Labour		Swing	▲1.2	

=== Dodleston ===
Dodleston
Party	Candidate	Votes	%	±%
Liberal Democrats	Mia Jones*	485	48.0	–5.5
Conservative	Stephen Shakeshaft	448	44.4	+3.8
Labour	Sara Barnsley	77	7.6	+1.7
Majority		37	3.7	–9.1
Turnout		1,010	62.1	+6.8
Registered electors		1,626		
Liberal Democrats hold		Swing	▼4.7	

=== Farndon ===
Farndon
Party	Candidate	Votes	%	±%
Liberal Democrats	Paul Roberts	608	61.2	+1.1
Conservative	Derek Dutton	347	34.9	–1.3
Labour	Steven Duffus	39	3.9	+0.2
Majority		261	26.3	+2.4
Turnout		994	64.0	+12.3
Registered electors		1,553		
Liberal Democrats hold		Swing	▲1.2	

=== Handbridge & St. Marys ===
Handbridge & St. Marys
Party	Candidate	Votes	%	±%
Conservative	Stephen Mosley*	1,138	51.9	+10.9
Labour	Pamela Stanley	799	36.5	–13.5
Liberal Democrats	Trevor Jones	254	11.6	+2.6
Majority		239	15.5	N/A
Turnout		2,191	62.2	+8.0
Registered electors		3,360		
Conservative hold		Swing	▲12.2	

=== Hoole Groves ===
Hoole Groves
Party	Candidate	Votes	%	±%
Liberal Democrats	David Hull*	918	52.5	+8.8
Labour	Alex Black	585	33.4	–6.9
Conservative	Thomas Lewis	246	14.1	+3.4
Majority		333	19.0	+15.5
Turnout		1,749	55.9	+7.0
Registered electors		3,127		
Liberal Democrats hold		Swing	▲7.8	

=== Lache Park ===
Lache Park
Party	Candidate	Votes	%	±%
Labour	David Hughes*	828	42.9	–14.0
Conservative	Charles Pearson	463	24.0	+0.7
Independent	Arthur Harada	348	18.0	+6.6
Liberal Democrats	Allan Stobie	292	15.1	+6.7
Majority		365	18.9	–14.8
Turnout		1,931	44.9	+16.3
Registered electors		4,296		
Labour hold		Swing	▼7.4	

=== Malpas ===
Malpas
Party	Candidate	Votes	%	±%
Conservative	Eveleigh Moore Dutton*	932	66.8	+7.9
Liberal Democrats	Robert Flannery	342	24.5	–8.1
Labour	Margaret Violet	122	8.7	+0.3
Majority		590	42.3	+16.0
Turnout		1,396	43.3	+10.0
Registered electors		3,226		
Conservative hold		Swing	▲8.0	

=== Newton Brook ===
Newton Brook
Party	Candidate	Votes	%	±%
Conservative	John Ebo*	741	46.9	+12.4
Liberal Democrats	Barbara Yakan	540	34.2	–13.5
Labour	Hilary Harrison	298	18.9	+1.1
Majority		201	12.7	N/A
Turnout		1,579	53.0	+16.6
Registered electors		2,981		
Conservative hold		Swing	▲13.0	

=== Newton St. Michaels ===
Newton St. Michaels
Party	Candidate	Votes	%	±%
Liberal Democrats	Terry Ralph*	588	42.1	–3.2
Labour	Peter Griffiths	511	36.6	+0.9
Conservative	Trudy Ryall-Harvey	298	21.3	+2.3
Majority		77	5.5	–4.1
Turnout		1,397	52.4	+9.7
Registered electors		2,981		
Liberal Democrats hold		Swing	▼2.1	

=== Saughall ===
Saughall
Party	Candidate	Votes	%	±%
Conservative	Jeanne Storrar*	954	62.5	+7.7
Labour	Thomas Andrews	338	22.1	–14.5
Liberal Democrats	Jo Pemberton	235	15.4	+6.8
Majority		616	40.3	+22.0
Turnout		1,527	53.0	+13.7
Registered electors		2,666		
Conservative hold		Swing	▲11.1	

=== Tarvin ===
Tarvin
Party	Candidate	Votes	%	±%
Conservative	Barbara Roberts*	1,108	59.7	–12.4
Liberal Democrats	Andrew Garman	446	24.0	+12.8
Labour	Anthony Pegrum	302	16.3	–0.5
Majority		662	35.7	–19.6
Turnout		1,856	56.0	+21.7
Registered electors		3,310		
Conservative hold		Swing	▼12.6	

=== Tattenhall ===
Tattenhall
Party	Candidate	Votes	%	±%
Conservative	Michael Jones*	1,058	68.7	N/A
Liberal Democrats	Vera Roberts	259	16.8	N/A
Labour	John Vernon	222	14.4	+2.2
Majority		799	51.9	N/A
Turnout		1,539	50.7	+17.9
Registered electors		3,037		
Conservative hold				

=== Upton Grange ===
Upton Grange
Party	Candidate	Votes	%	±%
Liberal Democrats	Jean Evans*	1,149	47.5	–4.1
Conservative	Christopher Green	881	36.4	+3.7
Labour	Brenda Southward	388	16.0	+0.2
Majority		268	11.1	–7.8
Turnout		2,418	49.3	+15.7
Registered electors		4,908		
Liberal Democrats hold		Swing	▼3.9	

=== Upton Westlea ===
Upton Westlea
Party	Candidate	Votes	%	±%
Conservative	Patricia Lott	753	47.9	+2.0
Labour	Richard Taylor*	490	31.2	–10.0
Liberal Democrats	Michael Main	328	20.9	+8.1
Majority		263	16.7	+12.0
Turnout		1,571	53.8	+7.3
Registered electors		3,011		
Conservative gain from Labour		Swing	▲6.0	

=== Vicars Cross ===
Vicars Cross
Party	Candidate	Votes	%	±%
Liberal Democrats	Paul Cheetham	1,288	55.9	+1.0
Conservative	Peter Moore-Dutton	682	29.6	–4.0
Labour	Christine Davies	333	14.5	+3.0
Majority		606	26.3	+5.0
Turnout		2,303	52.7	+17.8
Registered electors		4,373		
Liberal Democrats hold		Swing	▲2.5	

=== Waverton ===
Waverton
Party	Candidate	Votes	%	±%
Liberal Democrats	Jeffrey Clarke	617	54.0	+3.7
Conservative	Stuart Parker	378	33.1	–9.9
Labour	Paul Cornwell	147	12.9	+6.1
Majority		239	20.9	+13.6
Turnout		1,142	68.2	+15.2
Registered electors		1,675		
Liberal Democrats hold		Swing	▲6.8	
