= 1994 Chester City Council election =

1994 English local election

← 1992	5 May 1994	1995 →

20 out of 60 seats to Chester City Council 31 seats needed for a majority

	First party	Second party
Party	Conservative	Labour
Last election	23 seats, 40.0%	19 seats, 31.4%
Seats won	4	10
Seats after	23	19
Seat change	Steady	Steady
Popular vote	10,247	15,809
Percentage	29.2%	45.1%
Swing	▼11.8%	▲13.7%
	Third party	Fourth party
Party	Liberal Democrats	Independent
Last election	16 seats, 23.9%	2 seats, 3.3%
Seats won	6	0
Seats after	16	2
Seat change	Steady	Steady
Popular vote	8,754	N/A
Percentage	25.0%	N/A
Swing	▲1.1%	▼3.3%
- Winner of each seat at the 1994 Chester City Council election
Council control before election
No overall control
Council control after election
No overall control

The 1994 Chester City Council election took place on 5 May 1994 to elect members of Chester City Council in Cheshire, England. This was on the same day as other local elections.

== Summary ==
=== Election result ===
1994 Chester City Council election
Party	This election			Full council			This election		
Party	Seats	Net	Seats %	Other	Total	Total %	Votes	Votes %	+/−
Conservative	4	Steady	20.0	19	23	37.7	10,247	29.2	–11.8
Labour	10	Steady	50.0	9	19	31.1	15,809	45.1	+13.7
Liberal Democrats	6	Steady	30.0	10	16	26.2	8,754	25.0	+1.1
Ratepayer	0	Steady	0.0	0	0	0.0	168	0.5	+0.2
Green	0	Steady	0.0	0	0	0.0	102	0.3	+0.2

== Ward results ==
=== Barrow ===
Barrow
Party	Candidate	Votes	%	±%
Conservative	E. Johnson	860	54.5	–14.3
Labour	R. Barlow*	717	45.5	+14.3
Majority		143	9.1	–28.4
Turnout		1,577	41.0	–3.0
Registered electors		3,860		
Conservative hold		Swing	▼14.3	

=== Blacon Hall ===
Blacon Hall
Party	Candidate	Votes	%	±%
Labour	J. Price*	1,218	92.5	+14.5
Conservative	J. Shanklin	99	7.5	–14.5
Majority		1,119	85.0	+29.1
Turnout		1,317	31.0	+5.2
Registered electors		4,315		
Labour hold		Swing	▲14.5	

=== Boughton ===
Boughton
Party	Candidate	Votes	%	±%
Labour	R. Rudd*	684	57.3	+5.8
Conservative	G. Robinson	347	29.1	–10.6
Liberal Democrats	M. Ford	163	13.7	+4.9
Majority		337	28.2	+16.4
Turnout		1,194	42.0	–8.6
Registered electors		2,863		
Labour hold		Swing	▲8.2	

=== Boughton Heath ===
Boughton Heath
Party	Candidate	Votes	%	±%
Liberal Democrats	J. Kennerley*	1,259	53.0	+4.9
Conservative	M. Binns	661	27.8	–11.9
Labour	E. Davies	454	19.1	+6.9
Majority		598	25.2	+16.8
Turnout		2,374	51.0	–12.3
Registered electors		4,624		
Liberal Democrats hold		Swing	▲8.4	

=== College ===
College
Party	Candidate	Votes	%	±%
Labour	S. Rudd	1,290	68.1	+12.1
Conservative	G. Vickers	435	23.0	–4.9
Ratepayer	D. Taylor	168	8.9	+4.5
Majority		855	45.2	+17.1
Turnout		1,893	36.0	–4.4
Registered electors		5,231		
Labour hold		Swing	▲8.5	

=== Curzon ===
Curzon
Party	Candidate	Votes	%	±%
Labour	A. Murphy*	968	53.1	+12.6
Conservative	T. Lewis	675	37.0	–10.8
Liberal Democrats	H. Prydderch	181	9.9	–1.8
Majority		293	16.1	N/A
Turnout		1,824	60.0	+2.3
Registered electors		3,046		
Labour hold		Swing	▲11.7	

=== Dee Point ===
Dee Point
Party	Candidate	Votes	%	±%
Labour	R. Jones*	1,199	85.7	+19.3
Conservative	J. Jaworzyn	200	14.3	–12.6
Majority		999	71.4	+31.9
Turnout		1,399	31.0	+0.9
Registered electors		4,454		
Labour hold		Swing	▲16.0	

=== Elton ===
Elton
Party	Candidate	Votes	%	±%
Labour	B. Cowper*	1,270	59.1	+17.0
Conservative	J. Boughton	880	40.9	–17.0
Majority		390	18.1	N/A
Turnout		2,150	45.0	–1.5
Registered electors		4,757		
Labour hold		Swing	▲17.0	

=== Grosvenor ===
Grosvenor
Party	Candidate	Votes	%	±%
Labour	L. Barlow	1,297	57.4	+23.5
Conservative	J. France-Hayhurst	961	42.6	–9.6
Majority		336	14.9	N/A
Turnout		2,258	52.0	±0.0
Registered electors		4,351		
Labour hold		Swing	▲16.6	

=== Hoole ===
Hoole
Party	Candidate	Votes	%	±%
Liberal Democrats	E. Bolton*	1,347	57.1	+7.6
Labour	B. Johnson	838	35.6	–3.1
Conservative	W. Stuart	172	7.3	–4.5
Majority		509	21.6	+10.8
Turnout		2,357	49.0	–2.5
Registered electors		4,781		
Liberal Democrats hold		Swing	▲5.4	

=== Mollington ===
Mollington
Party	Candidate	Votes	%	±%
Conservative	B. Crowe	469	51.5	–12.6
Liberal Democrats	J. Pemberton	321	35.2	N/A
Labour	C. Gahan	121	13.3	–22.6
Majority		148	16.2	–11.9
Turnout		911	44.0	–0.2
Registered electors		2,053		
Conservative hold				

=== Newton ===
Newton
Party	Candidate	Votes	%	±%
Liberal Democrats	M. Garrod*	1,103	52.6	+16.4
Conservative	J. Jones	583	27.8	–19.8
Labour	W. Megarrell	410	19.6	+3.3
Majority		520	24.8	N/A
Turnout		2,096	52.0	–0.6
Registered electors		4,067		
Liberal Democrats hold		Swing	▲18.1	

=== Plas Newton ===
Plas Newton
Party	Candidate	Votes	%	±%
Liberal Democrats	M. Hale*	1,132	59.3	+21.2
Labour	A. Lightfoot	540	28.3	+2.3
Conservative	M. Parker	236	12.4	–23.5
Majority		592	31.0	+28.8
Turnout		1,908	52.0	–4.5
Registered electors		3,644		
Liberal Democrats hold		Swing	▲9.5	

=== Sealand ===
Sealand
Party	Candidate	Votes	%	±%
Labour	R. Cross	1,064	73.0	+15.6
Conservative	C. White	234	16.0	–8.3
Liberal Democrats	E. Bowman	160	11.0	–7.3
Majority		830	56.9	+23.8
Turnout		1,908	38.0	–4.0
Registered electors		3,834		
Labour hold		Swing	▲12.0	

=== Tarvin ===
Tarvin
Party	Candidate	Votes	%	±%
Conservative	M. Johnson*	709	57.2	–16.2
Labour	A. Pegrum	531	42.8	+16.2
Majority		178	14.4	–32.5
Turnout		1,240	37.0	–8.2
Registered electors		3,354		
Conservative hold		Swing	▼16.2	

=== Tilston ===
Tilston
Party	Candidate	Votes	%	±%
Conservative	A. Hough*	426	70.4	–0.5
Labour	E. Price	179	29.6	+0.5
Majority		247	40.8	–1.0
Turnout		605	43.0	–10.2
Registered electors		1,395		
Conservative hold		Swing	▼0.5	

=== Upton Grange ===
Upton Grange
Party	Candidate	Votes	%	±%
Liberal Democrats	D. Evans*	954	62.1	+8.4
Conservative	D. Smith	323	21.0	–16.2
Labour	P. Swales	258	16.8	+7.7
Majority		631	41.1	+24.6
Turnout		1,535	50.0	–1.0
Registered electors		3,050		
Liberal Democrats hold		Swing	▲12.3	

=== Upton Heath ===
Upton Heath
Party	Candidate	Votes	%	±%
Labour	P. Devine*	1,078	46.6	+5.6
Conservative	J. Butler	652	28.2	–21.2
Liberal Democrats	R. Biddle	582	25.2	+15.5
Majority		426	18.4	N/A
Turnout		2,312	57.0	+1.7
Registered electors		4,074		
Labour hold		Swing	▲13.4	

=== Vicars Cross ===
Vicars Cross
Party	Candidate	Votes	%	±%
Liberal Democrats	G. Proctor*	1,238	61.3	+8.4
Labour	C. Jones	410	20.3	+2.2
Conservative	R. Abrams	373	18.5	–10.5
Majority		828	41.0	+17.1
Turnout		2,021	46.0	–1.1
Registered electors		4,392		
Liberal Democrats hold		Swing	▲3.1	

=== Westminster ===
Westminster
Party	Candidate	Votes	%	±%
Labour	D. Hughes	1,283	48.4	+22.5
Conservative	S. Oram	952	35.9	–20.6
Liberal Democrats	K. Prydderch	314	11.8	–3.9
Green	M. Barker	102	3.8	+1.9
Majority		331	12.5	N/A
Turnout		2,651	52.0	+2.8
Registered electors		5,061		
Labour hold		Swing	▲21.6	
