= 1999 Chester City Council election =

1999 English local election

| ← 1998 | 6 May 1998 | 2000 → |

All 60 seats to Chester City Council 31 seats needed for a majority

| | First party | Second party |
|---|---|---|
| Party | Labour | Liberal Democrats |
| Last election | 25 seats, 39.7% | 17 seats, 25.2% |
| Seats won | 22 | 18 |
| Seat change | ▼3 | ▲1 |
| Popular vote | 26,045 | 18,236 |
| Percentage | 39.9% | 27.9% |
| Swing | ▲0.2% | ▲2.7% |
| | Third party | Fourth party |
| Party | Conservative | Independent |
| Last election | 16 seats, 34.0% | 2 seats, 0.2% |
| Seats won | 17 | 3 |
| Seat change | ▲1 | ▲1 |
| Popular vote | 18,653 | 2,419 |
| Percentage | 28.5% | 3.7% |
| Swing | ▼5.5% | ▲3.5% |
- Winner of each seat at the 1999 Chester City Council election
Council control before election
No overall control
Council control after election
No overall control

The 1999 Chester City Council election took place on 6 May 1999 to elect members of Chester City Council in Cheshire, England. This was on the same day as other local elections.

The whole council was up for election on new ward boundaries, with the total number of seats staying the same.

== Summary ==
=== Election result ===
1999 Chester City Council election
| Party | This election | | | Full council | | | This election | | |
| Party | Seats | Net | Seats % | Other | Total | Total % | Votes | Votes % | +/− |
|---|---|---|---|---|---|---|---|---|---|
| Labour | 22 | ▼3 | 36.7 | 0 | 22 | 36.7 | 26,045 | 39.9 | +0.2 |
| Liberal Democrats | 18 | ▲1 | 30.0 | 0 | 18 | 30.0 | 18,236 | 27.9 | +2.7 |
| Conservative | 17 | ▲1 | 28.3 | 0 | 17 | 28.3 | 18,653 | 28.5 | –5.5 |
| Independent | 3 | ▲1 | 5.0 | 0 | 3 | 5.0 | 2,419 | 3.7 | +3.5 |

== Ward results ==
=== Barrow ===
Barrow
| Party | Candidate | Votes | % | ±% |
|---|---|---|---|---|
| Conservative | E. Johnson* | 468 | 72.0 | +18.2 |
| Labour | D. Fell | 113 | 17.4 | –0.5 |
| Liberal Democrats | A. Hyde | 69 | 10.6 | –17.7 |
| Majority | | 355 | 54.6 | +29.0 |
| Turnout | | 650 | 43.3 | +8.3 |
| Registered electors | | 1,498 | | |
| Conservative hold | | Swing | ▲9.4 | |

=== Blacon Hall ===
Blacon Hall (3 seats)
| Party | Candidate | Votes | % |
|---|---|---|---|
| Labour | J. Price* | 983 | 76.6 |
| Labour | L. Price* | 919 | 71.6 |
| Labour | J. Randall* | 901 | 70.2 |
| Conservative | C. Issac | 221 | 17.2 |
| Liberal Democrats | P. McCabe | 138 | 10.7 |
| Independent | T. Colledge | 135 | 10.5 |
| Liberal Democrats | B. Yakan | 102 | 7.9 |
| Turnout | | 1,284 | 22.6 |
| Registered electors | | 5,679 | |
| Labour hold | | | |
| Labour hold | | | |
| Labour hold | | | |

=== Blacon Lodge ===
Blacon Lodge (3 seats)
| Party | Candidate | Votes | % |
|---|---|---|---|
| Labour | R. Jones* | 719 | 73.9 |
| Labour | M. Nelson* | 695 | 71.4 |
| Labour | J. Fetherston* | 659 | 67.7 |
| Conservative | J. Jaworzyn | 153 | 15.7 |
| Liberal Democrats | N. Hudson-Davies | 97 | 10.0 |
| Liberal Democrats | L. Biddle | 94 | 9.7 |
| Independent | G. Webb | 68 | 7.0 |
| Turnout | | 973 | 22.9 |
| Registered electors | | 4,249 | |
| Labour win (new seat) | | | |
| Labour win (new seat) | | | |
| Labour win (new seat) | | | |

=== Boughton ===
Boughton (2 seats)
| Party | Candidate | Votes | % |
|---|---|---|---|
| Labour | R. Rudd* | 597 | 61.7 |
| Labour | J. Vernon* | 563 | 58.2 |
| Conservative | A. Van Der Zwan | 257 | 26.5 |
| Liberal Democrats | P. Brett | 145 | 15.0 |
| Liberal Democrats | N. Worrall | 105 | 10.8 |
| Turnout | | 968 | 33.6 |
| Registered electors | | 2,881 | |
| Labour hold | | | |
| Labour hold | | | |

=== Boughton Heath ===
Boughton Heath (2 seats)
| Party | Candidate | Votes | % |
|---|---|---|---|
| Liberal Democrats | A. Farrell* | 772 | 70.4 |
| Liberal Democrats | J. Latham | 604 | 55.1 |
| Conservative | S. Winsor | 410 | 37.4 |
| Labour | E. Davies | 222 | 20.2 |
| Labour | J. Creswick | 192 | 17.5 |
| Turnout | | 1,097 | 35.5 |
| Registered electors | | 3,091 | |
| Liberal Democrats hold | | | |
| Liberal Democrats hold | | | |

=== Christleton ===
Christleton (2 seats)
| Party | Candidate | Votes | % |
|---|---|---|---|
| Conservative | J. Boughton* | 813 | 59.1 |
| Conservative | B. Bailey* | 790 | 57.5 |
| Labour | S. Wardman | 409 | 29.7 |
| Labour | A. Murphy | 401 | 29.2 |
| Liberal Democrats | J. Skerrett | 203 | 14.8 |
| Turnout | | 1,375 | 39.6 |
| Registered electors | | 3,472 | |
| Conservative hold | | | |
| Conservative hold | | | |

=== City & St. Annes ===
City & St. Annes (2 seats)
| Party | Candidate | Votes | % |
|---|---|---|---|
| Labour | G. Cooper | 478 | 61.0 |
| Labour | E. Degg* | 460 | 58.7 |
| Conservative | J. Burke | 247 | 31.5 |
| Turnout | | 783 | 29.2 |
| Registered electors | | 2,681 | |
| Labour win (new seat) | | | |
| Labour win (new seat) | | | |

=== College ===
College (3 seats)
| Party | Candidate | Votes | % |
|---|---|---|---|
| Labour | J. Baker* | 580 | 72.5 |
| Labour | S. Rudd* | 538 | 67.3 |
| Labour | S. Davies* | 532 | 66.5 |
| Liberal Democrats | S. Capstick | 176 | 22.0 |
| Liberal Democrats | J. Indermaur | 150 | 18.8 |
| Liberal Democrats | R. Yakan | 134 | 16.8 |
| Turnout | | 800 | 18.2 |
| Registered electors | | 4,394 | |
| Labour hold | | | |
| Labour hold | | | |
| Labour hold | | | |

=== Curzon & Westminster ===
Curzon & Westminster (2 seats)
| Party | Candidate | Votes | % |
|---|---|---|---|
| Conservative | R. Short* | 1,106 | 70.1 |
| Conservative | M. Poole | 1,039 | 65.9 |
| Labour | S. Murphy* | 357 | 22.6 |
| Labour | G. Williams | 306 | 19.4 |
| Liberal Democrats | H. Prydderch | 141 | 8.9 |
| Liberal Democrats | K. Prydderch | 107 | 6.8 |
| Turnout | | 1,577 | 45.1 |
| Registered electors | | 3,497 | |
| Conservative win (new seat) | | | |
| Conservative win (new seat) | | | |

=== Dodleston ===
Dodleston
| Party | Candidate | Votes | % | ±% |
|---|---|---|---|---|
| Conservative | W. Fair* | 383 | 49.3 | –1.7 |
| Liberal Democrats | R. Jones | 324 | 41.7 | +31.9 |
| Labour | R. Davies | 70 | 9.0 | –30.2 |
| Majority | | 59 | 7.6 | –4.3 |
| Turnout | | 777 | 48.7 | –0.3 |
| Registered electors | | 1,599 | | |
| Conservative hold | | Swing | ▼16.8 | |

=== Elton ===
Elton
| Party | Candidate | Votes | % |
|---|---|---|---|
| Labour | B. Cowper | 629 | 65.0 |
| Labour | D. Bennett* | 499 | 51.5 |
| Conservative | D. Rowlands | 336 | 34.7 |
| Turnout | | 968 | 30.4 |
| Registered electors | | 3,184 | |
| Labour gain from Conservative | | | |
| Labour hold | | | |

=== Farndon ===
Farndon
| Party | Candidate | Votes | % | ±% |
|---|---|---|---|---|
| Liberal Democrats | P. Roberts* | 509 | 57.6 | +11.1 |
| Conservative | R. Harris | 350 | 39.6 | –4.9 |
| Labour | A. Murphy | 24 | 2.7 | –6.2 |
| Majority | | 159 | 18.0 | +16.0 |
| Turnout | | 883 | 55.6 | +5.8 |
| Registered electors | | 1,587 | | |
| Liberal Democrats hold | | Swing | ▲8.0 | |

=== Handbridge & St. Marys ===
Handbridge & St. Marys (2 seats)
| Party | Candidate | Votes | % |
|---|---|---|---|
| Labour | R. Davidson* | 954 | 54.3 |
| Labour | L. Barlow | 946 | 53.9 |
| Conservative | C. Robson* | 815 | 46.4 |
| Conservative | P. Connolly | 812 | 46.3 |
| Turnout | | 1,755 | 49.2 |
| Registered electors | | 3,568 | |
| Labour win (new seat) | | | |
| Labour win (new seat) | | | |

=== Hoole All Saints ===
Hoole All Saints
| Party | Candidate | Votes | % |
|---|---|---|---|
| Liberal Democrats | J. Nuttall* | 638 | 60.0 |
| Liberal Democrats | N. McGlinchey | 596 | 56.1 |
| Labour | L. Kelly | 406 | 38.2 |
| Labour | A. Black | 401 | 37.7 |
| Turnout | | 1,063 | 40.4 |
| Registered electors | | 2,630 | |
| Liberal Democrats win (new seat) | | | |
| Liberal Democrats win (new seat) | | | |

=== Hoole Groves ===
Hoole Groves
| Party | Candidate | Votes | % |
|---|---|---|---|
| Liberal Democrats | M. Hale* | 807 | 49.4 |
| Liberal Democrats | D. Hull | 801 | 49.0 |
| Labour | D. Kelly* | 757 | 46.3 |
| Labour | J. Black | 750 | 49.5 |
| Turnout | | 1,634 | 51.8 |
| Registered electors | | 3,154 | |
| Liberal Democrats win (new seat) | | | |
| Liberal Democrats win (new seat) | | | |

=== Huntington ===
Huntington
| Party | Candidate | Votes | % |
|---|---|---|---|
| Liberal Democrats | J. Moore* | 299 | 43.0 |
| Conservative | M. Harrison | 222 | 31.9 |
| Labour | A. Treloar | 175 | 25.1 |
| Majority | | 77 | 11.1 |
| Turnout | | 696 | 43.2 |
| Registered electors | | 1,612 | |
| Liberal Democrats win (new seat) | | | |

=== Kelsall ===
Kelsall (2 seats)
| Party | Candidate | Votes | % |
|---|---|---|---|
| Independent | P. Tilley | 571 | 47.9 |
| Conservative | H. Deynem | 515 | 43.5 |
| Liberal Democrats | A. Castle | 481 | 40.4 |
| Liberal Democrats | A. Garman | 472 | 39.6 |
| Labour | J. Byrne | 133 | 11.2 |
| Labour | C. Byrne | 122 | 10.2 |
| Turnout | | 1,192 | 41.2 |
| Registered electors | | 2,894 | |
| Independent win (new seat) | | | |
| Conservative win (new seat) | | | |

=== Lache Park ===
Lache Park (3 seats)
| Party | Candidate | Votes | % |
|---|---|---|---|
| Labour | D. Challen* | 839 | 60.7 |
| Labour | J. Mercer* | 823 | 59.5 |
| Labour | D. Hughes | 819 | 59.2 |
| Conservative | J. Price | 466 | 33.7 |
| Conservative | S. Burke | 448 | 32.4 |
| Conservative | R. Robertson | 445 | 32.2 |
| Turnout | | 1,383 | 29.1 |
| Registered electors | | 4,753 | |
| Labour win (new seat) | | | |
| Labour win (new seat) | | | |
| Labour win (new seat) | | | |

=== Malpas ===
Malpas (2 seats)
| Party | Candidate | Votes | % |
|---|---|---|---|
| Independent | C. Higgie* | 764 | 67.6 |
| Conservative | E. Moore-Dutton | 599 | 53.7 |
| Liberal Democrats | V. Roberts | 244 | 21.9 |
| Labour | A. Mulvihill | 92 | 8.3 |
| Labour | V. Randall | 89 | 8.0 |
| Turnout | | 1,115 | 34.3 |
| Registered electors | | 3,250 | |
| Independent hold | | | |
| Conservative hold | | | |

=== Mickle Trafford ===
Mickle Trafford
| Party | Candidate | Votes | % |
|---|---|---|---|
| Conservative | M. Parker* | 457 | 74.4 |
| Labour | V. Preite | 157 | 25.6 |
| Majority | | 300 | 48.9 |
| Turnout | | 614 | 34.3 |
| Registered electors | | 1,792 | |
| Conservative win (new seat) | | | |

=== Mollington ===
Mollington
| Party | Candidate | Votes | % | ±% |
|---|---|---|---|---|
| Conservative | B. Crowe* | 446 | 71.1 | +11.4 |
| Liberal Democrats | J. Pemberton | 127 | 20.3 | N/A |
| Labour | T. Andrews | 54 | 8.6 | –0.6 |
| Majority | | 319 | 50.9 | +16.5 |
| Turnout | | 627 | 39.7 | +5.7 |
| Registered electors | | 1,583 | | |
| Conservative hold | | | | |

=== Newton Brook ===
Newton Brook (2 seats)
| Party | Candidate | Votes | % |
|---|---|---|---|
| Liberal Democrats | R. Biddle* | 444 | 41.5 |
| Conservative | J. Ebo | 432 | 40.4 |
| Liberal Democrats | D. Simpson* | 395 | 36.9 |
| Conservative | C. Power | 349 | 32.6 |
| Labour | D. Kilfoyle | 221 | 20.7 |
| Labour | R. Teasdale | 188 | 17.6 |
| Turnout | | 1,070 | 34.6 |
| Registered electors | | 3,092 | |
| Liberal Democrats win (new seat) | | | |
| Conservative win (new seat) | | | |

=== Newton St. Michaels ===
Newton St. Michaels (2 seats)
| Party | Candidate | Votes | % |
|---|---|---|---|
| Liberal Democrats | R. Hale* | 592 | 51.0 |
| Liberal Democrats | T. Ralph* | 589 | 50.7 |
| Labour | J. Stiles | 537 | 46.3 |
| Labour | J. McKiernan | 502 | 43.2 |
| Turnout | | 1,161 | 42.9 |
| Registered electors | | 2,706 | |
| Liberal Democrats win (new seat) | | | |
| Liberal Democrats win (new seat) | | | |

=== Saughall ===
Saughall (2 seats)
| Party | Candidate | Votes | % |
|---|---|---|---|
| Conservative | R. Storrar* | 702 | 53.4 |
| Conservative | R. Noakes | 563 | 42.8 |
| Labour | P. Humphrey | 548 | 41.7 |
| Labour | A. Coughlan* | 532 | 40.5 |
| Liberal Democrats | G. Ralph | 83 | 6.3 |
| Liberal Democrats | P. Cheetham | 79 | 6.0 |
| Turnout | | 1,314 | 44.9 |
| Registered electors | | 2,927 | |
| Conservative hold | | | |
| Conservative hold | | | |

=== Tarvin ===
Tarvin (2 seats)
| Party | Candidate | Votes | % |
|---|---|---|---|
| Conservative | C. Penderleath | 851 | 73.0 |
| Conservative | B. Roberts | 714 | 61.9 |
| Labour | A. Pegrum | 242 | 21.0 |
| Labour | B. Page | 204 | 17.7 |
| Liberal Democrats | B. Lockwood | 127 | 11.0 |
| Turnout | | 1,153 | 33.8 |
| Registered electors | | 3,411 | |
| Conservative hold | | | |
| Conservative hold | | | |

=== Tattenhall ===
Tattenhall (2 seats)
| Party | Candidate | Votes | % |
|---|---|---|---|
| Independent | J. Haynes* | 881 | 89.0 |
| Conservative | M. Jones* | 645 | 65.2 |
| Liberal Democrats | M. Richardson | 239 | 24.1 |
| Labour | E. Pickering | 113 | 11.4 |
| Labour | W. Humphrey | 108 | 10.9 |
| Turnout | | 990 | 34.2 |
| Registered electors | | 2,896 | |
| Independent hold | | | |
| Conservative hold | | | |

=== Tilston ===
Tilston
| Party | Candidate | Votes | % | ±% |
|---|---|---|---|---|
| Conservative | N. Ritchie* | 613 | 88.6 | +1.8 |
| Labour | E. Price | 43 | 6.2 | –0.3 |
| Liberal Democrats | D. Nall | 36 | 5.2 | –1.5 |
| Majority | | 570 | 82.4 | +2.4 |
| Turnout | | 692 | 42.5 | +3.2 |
| Registered electors | | 1,627 | | |
| Conservative hold | | Swing | ▲1.2 | |

=== Upton Grange ===
Upton Grange (3 seats)
| Party | Candidate | Votes | % |
|---|---|---|---|
| Liberal Democrats | C. Bain* | 1,152 | 61.5 |
| Liberal Democrats | D. Evans* | 1,103 | 58.9 |
| Liberal Democrats | J. Evans | 996 | 53.2 |
| Conservative | J. Storrar | 582 | 31.1 |
| Labour | C. Alcock | 429 | 22.9 |
| Labour | F. Baker | 350 | 18.7 |
| Labour | B. Lipscombe | 321 | 17.1 |
| Turnout | | 1,872 | 36.3 |
| Registered electors | | 5,158 | |
| Liberal Democrats hold | | | |
| Liberal Democrats hold | | | |
| Liberal Democrats hold | | | |

=== Upton Westlea ===
Upton Westlea (2 seats)
| Party | Candidate | Votes | % |
|---|---|---|---|
| Labour | S. Duffus* | 659 | 52.5 |
| Labour | R. Taylor | 651 | 51.9 |
| Conservative | J. Butler | 384 | 30.6 |
| Conservative | N. Fitton | 370 | 29.5 |
| Liberal Democrats | D. Capstick | 223 | 17.8 |
| Liberal Democrats | R. Jordan | 176 | 14.0 |
| Turnout | | 1,255 | 40.8 |
| Registered electors | | 3,076 | |
| Labour win (new seat) | | | |
| Labour win (new seat) | | | |

=== Vicars Cross ===
Vicars Cross (3 seats)
| Party | Candidate | Votes | % |
|---|---|---|---|
| Liberal Democrats | G. Proctor* | 1,111 | 68.0 |
| Liberal Democrats | K. Holding* | 1,084 | 66.3 |
| Liberal Democrats | J. McCabe* | 1,058 | 64.7 |
| Labour | S. Barnsley | 325 | 19.9 |
| Labour | K. Jones | 316 | 19.3 |
| Labour | C. Jones | 316 | 19.3 |
| Conservative | D. Samsom | 283 | 17.3 |
| Turnout | | 1,635 | 37.0 |
| Registered electors | | 4,418 | |
| Liberal Democrats hold | | | |
| Liberal Democrats hold | | | |
| Liberal Democrats hold | | | |

=== Waverton ===
Waverton
| Party | Candidate | Votes | % | ±% |
|---|---|---|---|---|
| Liberal Democrats | C. Walley* | 466 | 51.2 | –17.9 |
| Conservative | S. Robson-Catling | 367 | 40.3 | +17.9 |
| Labour | C. Davies | 77 | 8.5 | ±0.0 |
| Majority | | 99 | 10.9 | –35.8 |
| Turnout | | 910 | 52.5 | –4.5 |
| Registered electors | | 1,733 | | |
| Liberal Democrats hold | | Swing | ▼17.9 | |
