= 1992 Chester City Council election =

1992 English local election

← 1991	7 May 1992	1994 →

20 out of 60 seats to Chester City Council 31 seats needed for a majority

	First party	Second party
Party	Conservative	Labour
Last election	24 seats, 36.9%	21 seats, 34.6%
Seats won	9	5
Seats after	23	19
Seat change	▼1	▼2
Popular vote	13,223	10,126
Percentage	41.0%	31.4%
Swing	▲4.1%	▼3.2%
	Third party	Fourth party
Party	Liberal Democrats	Independent
Last election	14 seats, 24.0%	1 seat, 3.9%
Seats won	5	1
Seats after	16	2
Seat change	▲2	▲1
Popular vote	7,716	1,060
Percentage	23.9%	3.3%
Swing	▼0.1%	▼0.6%
- Winner of each seat at the 1992 Chester City Council election
Council control before election
No overall control
Council control after election
No overall control

The 1992 Chester City Council election took place on 7 May 1992 to elect members of Chester City Council in Cheshire, England. This was on the same day as other local elections.

== Summary ==
=== Election result ===
1992 Chester City Council election
Party	This election			Full council			This election		
Party	Seats	Net	Seats %	Other	Total	Total %	Votes	Votes %	+/−
Conservative	9	▼1	45.0	14	23	37.7	13,223	41.0	+4.1
Labour	5	▼2	25.0	14	19	31.1	10,126	31.4	–3.2
Liberal Democrats	5	▲2	25.0	11	16	26.2	7,716	23.9	–0.1
Independent	1	▲1	5.0	1	2	4.9	1,060	3.3	–0.6
Ratepayer	0	Steady	0.0	0	0	0.0	84	0.3	+0.1
Green	0	Steady	0.0	0	0	0.0	43	0.1	–0.3

== Ward results ==
=== Blacon Hall ===
Blacon Hall
Party	Candidate	Votes	%	±%
Labour	J. Randall*	842	78.0	–6.9
Conservative	T. Truesdale	238	22.0	+6.9
Majority		604	55.9	–13.7
Turnout		1,081	25.8	–10.7
Registered electors		4,184		
Labour hold		Swing	▼6.9	

=== Boughton ===
Boughton
Party	Candidate	Votes	%	±%
Labour	D. Halley	683	51.5	–17.1
Conservative	G. Robinson	526	39.7	+16.4
Liberal Democrats	P. Brett	116	8.8	+0.6
Majority		157	11.8	–33.4
Turnout		1,326	50.6	–9.6
Registered electors		2,618		
Labour hold		Swing	▼16.8	

=== Christleton ===
Christleton
Party	Candidate	Votes	%	±%
Conservative	B. Bailey*	1,056	61.5	+3.7
Liberal Democrats	R. Beith	331	19.3	–1.2
Labour	S. Wardman	330	19.2	–2.5
Majority		725	42.2	+6.1
Turnout		1,717	46.4	–3.6
Registered electors		3,697		
Conservative hold		Swing	▲2.5	

=== College ===
College
Party	Candidate	Votes	%	±%
Labour	C. Russell*	1,059	56.0	–2.3
Conservative	A. Hodgson	527	27.9	+2.2
Liberal Democrats	J. Pay	220	11.6	–0.1
Ratepayer	D. Taylor	84	4.4	±0.0
Majority		532	28.1	–4.5
Turnout		1,890	40.4	–5.3
Registered electors		4,676		
Labour hold		Swing	▼2.3	

=== Curzon ===
Curzon
Party	Candidate	Votes	%	±%
Conservative	J. Price	809	47.8	+9.4
Labour	L. Nixon	686	40.5	–21.1
Liberal Democrats	J. Main	198	11.7	N/A
Majority		123	7.3	N/A
Turnout		1,693	57.7	–11.2
Registered electors		2,936		
Conservative gain from Labour		Swing	▲15.3	

=== Dee Point ===
Dee Point
Party	Candidate	Votes	%	±%
Labour	J. Fetherston*	875	66.4	–14.7
Conservative	J. Jaworzyn	355	26.9	+8.0
Liberal Democrats	J. Indermaur	88	6.7	N/A
Majority		520	39.5	–22.6
Turnout		1,318	30.1	–9.1
Registered electors		4,378		
Labour hold		Swing	▼11.4	

=== Farndon ===
Farndon
Party	Candidate	Votes	%	±%
Conservative	S. Rowlandson*	529	78.0	+4.4
Labour	P. Byrne	149	22.0	–4.4
Majority		380	56.0	+8.8
Turnout		678	40.3	+0.6
Registered electors		1,683		
Conservative hold		Swing	▲4.4	

=== Grosvenor ===
Grosvenor
Party	Candidate	Votes	%	±%
Conservative	P. Connolly	1,152	52.2	+5.9
Labour	S. Rudd	749	33.9	–3.3
Liberal Democrats	P. Speirs	307	13.9	–2.5
Majority		403	18.3	+9.2
Turnout		2,208	52.0	–7.9
Registered electors		4,244		
Conservative hold		Swing	▲4.6	

=== Hoole ===
Hoole
Party	Candidate	Votes	%	±%
Liberal Democrats	T. Veitch*	1,084	49.5	–1.6
Labour	M. Foster	848	38.7	–0.5
Conservative	M. Vaughan	258	11.8	+2.1
Majority		236	10.8	–1.1
Turnout		2,190	51.5	–7.5
Registered electors		4,256		
Liberal Democrats hold		Swing	▼0.6	

=== Malpas ===
Malpas
Party	Candidate	Votes	%	±%
Independent	C. Higgie	600	51.0	+8.2
Conservative	G. Roberts	577	49.0	–1.2
Majority		23	2.0	N/A
Turnout		1,177	40.2	–7.2
Registered electors		2,926		
Independent gain from Conservative		Swing	▲4.7	

=== Newton ===
Newton
Party	Candidate	Votes	%	±%
Conservative	J. Ebo*	995	47.6	+8.6
Liberal Democrats	W. Williams	757	36.2	–5.8
Labour	W. Megarrell	340	16.3	–2.7
Majority		238	11.4	N/A
Turnout		2,092	52.6	–5.6
Registered electors		3,975		
Conservative hold		Swing	▲7.2	

=== Plas Newton ===
Plas Newton
Party	Candidate	Votes	%	±%
Liberal Democrats	T. Ralph*	774	38.1	–11.5
Conservative	A. Smith	729	35.9	+14.5
Labour	A. Mulvihill	528	26.0	–3.0
Majority		45	2.2	N/A
Turnout		2,031	56.5	–3.2
Registered electors		3,596		
Liberal Democrats hold		Swing	▼13.0	

=== Saughall ===
Saughall
Party	Candidate	Votes	%	±%
Conservative	A. Coughlan*	697	48.5	+4.7
Liberal Democrats	J. Ballard	593	41.2	+5.1
Labour	S. Newton	148	10.3	–9.7
Majority		104	7.2	–0.5
Turnout		1,438	49.0	–8.0
Registered electors		2,933		
Conservative hold		Swing	▼0.2	

=== Sealand ===
Sealand
Party	Candidate	Votes	%	±%
Labour	R. Bott*	814	57.4	–8.2
Conservative	J. David	345	24.3	+4.5
Liberal Democrats	E. Bowman	260	18.3	+10.1
Majority		469	33.1	–12.7
Turnout		1,419	42.0	–5.2
Registered electors		3,382		
Labour hold		Swing	▼6.4	

=== Tattenhall ===
Tattenhall
Party	Candidate	Votes	%	±%
Conservative	M. Jones	510	45.6	N/A
Independent	B. Smith	460	41.1	N/A
Liberal Democrats	T. Williams	148	13.2	N/A
Majority		50	4.5	N/A
Turnout		1,118	44.0	–2.5
Registered electors		2,534		
Conservative hold				

=== Upton Grange ===
Upton Grange
Party	Candidate	Votes	%	±%
Liberal Democrats	C. Bain	789	53.7	–3.2
Conservative	J. Butler*	547	37.2	+12.2
Labour	N. King	134	9.1	–9.0
Majority		242	16.5	–15.5
Turnout		1,470	51.0	–8.9
Registered electors		2,879		
Liberal Democrats gain from Conservative		Swing	▼7.7	

=== Upton Heath ===
Upton Heath
Party	Candidate	Votes	%	±%
Conservative	N. Fitton	1,114	49.4	+3.9
Labour	S. Grant	924	41.0	–2.9
Liberal Democrats	P. Hancox	218	9.7	–0.9
Majority		190	8.4	+6.8
Turnout		2,256	55.3	–5.2
Registered electors		4,079		
Conservative gain from Labour		Swing	▲3.4	

=== Vicars Cross ===
Vicars Cross
Party	Candidate	Votes	%	±%
Liberal Democrats	K. Holding*	1,040	52.9	–11.4
Conservative	D. Robotham	571	29.0	+8.9
Labour	P. Whitley	355	18.1	+2.6
Majority		469	23.9	–20.3
Turnout		1,966	47.1	–6.6
Registered electors		4,173		
Liberal Democrats hold		Swing	▼10.2	

=== Waverton ===
Waverton
Party	Candidate	Votes	%	±%
Liberal Democrats	C. Walley	428	49.4	+6.3
Conservative	J. Cleland	377	43.5	–1.2
Labour	F. Baker	62	7.2	–5.0
Majority		51	5.9	N/A
Turnout		867	61.3	
Registered electors		1,415		
Liberal Democrats gain from Conservative		Swing	▲3.8	

=== Westminster ===
Westminster
Party	Candidate	Votes	%	±%
Conservative	R. Short*	1,311	56.5	+12.6
Labour	L. Barlow	600	25.9	–6.7
Liberal Democrats	A. Stobie	365	15.7	–5.2
Green	M. Barker	43	1.9	–0.7
Majority		711	30.7	+19.4
Turnout		2,319	49.2	–14.6
Registered electors		4,710		
Conservative hold		Swing	▲9.7	
