= 2000 Chester City Council election =

2000 English local election

← 1999	4 May 2000	2002 →

20 out of 60 seats to Chester City Council 31 seats needed for a majority

	First party	Second party
Party	Labour	Liberal Democrats
Last election	22 seats, 39.9%	18 seats, 27.9%
Seats won	6	8
Seats after	21	19
Seat change	▼1	▲1
Popular vote	6,771	7,129
Percentage	29.3%	30.8%
Swing	▼10.6%	▲2.9%
	Third party	Fourth party
Party	Conservative	Independent
Last election	17 seats, 28.5%	3 seats, 3.7%
Seats won	6	0
Seats after	17	3
Seat change	Steady	Steady
Popular vote	9,151	N/A
Percentage	39.6%	N/A
Swing	▲11.1%	▼3.7%
- Winner of each seat at the 2000 Chester City Council election
Council control before election
No overall control
Council control after election
No overall control

The 2000 Chester City Council election took place on 4 May 2000 to elect members of Chester City Council in Cheshire, England. This was on the same day as other local elections.

== Summary ==
=== Election result ===
2000 Chester City Council election
Party	This election			Full council			This election		
Party	Seats	Net	Seats %	Other	Total	Total %	Votes	Votes %	+/−
Labour	6	▼1	30.0	15	21	35.0	6,771	29.3	–10.6
Liberal Democrats	8	▲1	40.0	11	19	31.7	7,129	30.8	+2.9
Conservative	6	Steady	30.0	11	17	28.3	9,151	39.6	+11.1
Independent	0	Steady	0.0	3	3	5.0	N/A	N/A	–3.7
Ratepayer	0	Steady	0.0	0	0	0.0	56	0.2	N/A
Socialist Alliance	0	Steady	0.0	0	0	0.0	12	0.1	N/A

== Ward results ==
=== Blacon Hall ===
Blacon Hall
Party	Candidate	Votes	%	±%
Labour	J. Randall*	688	65.1	–1.5
Conservative	C. Isaac	276	26.1	+11.1
Liberal Democrats	B. Yakan	93	8.8	–0.5
Majority		412	39.0	N/A
Turnout		1,057	18.7	–3.9
Registered electors		5,656		
Labour hold		Swing	▼6.3	

=== Blacon Lodge ===
Blacon Lodge
Party	Candidate	Votes	%	±%
Labour	J. Fetherston*	534	65.3	–4.0
Conservative	J. Jaworzyn	199	24.3	+9.5
Liberal Democrats	R. Thompson	85	10.4	+1.0
Majority		335	41.0	N/A
Turnout		818	19.9	–3.0
Registered electors		4,113		
Labour hold		Swing	▼6.8	

=== Boughton Heath ===
Boughton Heath
Party	Candidate	Votes	%	±%
Liberal Democrats	J. Latham*	519	46.5	–8.5
Conservative	J. Burke	432	38.7	+9.5
Labour	J. Herson	165	14.8	–1.0
Majority		87	7.8	N/A
Turnout		1,116	35.9	+0.4
Registered electors		3,110		
Liberal Democrats hold		Swing	▼9.0	

=== City & St. Annes ===
City & St. Annes
Party	Candidate	Votes	%	±%
Labour	J. Stiles	399	51.2	–14.7
Conservative	J. Burke	257	33.0	–1.1
Liberal Democrats	P. Cheetham	67	8.6	N/A
Ratepayer	D. Taylor	56	7.2	N/A
Majority		142	18.2	N/A
Turnout		779	29.6	+0.4
Registered electors		2,630		
Labour hold		Swing	▼6.8	

=== College ===
College
Party	Candidate	Votes	%	±%
Labour	S. Davies*	485	54.6	–22.1
Conservative	J. Price	229	25.8	N/A
Liberal Democrats	D. Mead	175	19.7	–3.6
Majority		256	28.8	N/A
Turnout		889	20.1	+1.9
Registered electors		4,420		
Labour hold				

=== Dodleston ===
Dodleston
Party	Candidate	Votes	%	±%
Liberal Democrats	R. Jones	479	53.5	+11.8
Conservative	M. Walker	364	40.6	–8.7
Labour	A. Murphy	53	5.9	–3.1
Majority		115	12.8	N/A
Turnout		896	55.3	+6.6
Registered electors		1,620		
Liberal Democrats gain from Conservative		Swing	▲10.3	

=== Farndon ===
Farndon
Party	Candidate	Votes	%	±%
Liberal Democrats	P. Roberts*	483	60.1	+2.5
Conservative	P. Edwards	291	36.2	–3.4
Labour	E. Price	30	3.7	+1.0
Majority		192	23.9	N/A
Turnout		804	51.7	–3.9
Registered electors		1,556		
Liberal Democrats hold		Swing	▲3.0	

=== Handbridge & St. Marys ===
Handbridge & St. Marys
Party	Candidate	Votes	%	±%
Conservative	S. Mosley	1,009	53.0	+6.9
Labour	D. Kelly	756	39.7	–14.2
Liberal Democrats	H. Prydderch	137	7.2	N/A
Majority		253	13.3	N/A
Turnout		1,902	54.1	+4.9
Registered electors		3,516		
Conservative gain from Labour		Swing	▲10.6	

=== Hoole Groves ===
Hoole Groves
Party	Candidate	Votes	%	±%
Liberal Democrats	D. Hull*	801	58.1	+6.5
Labour	J. Black	407	29.5	–18.9
Conservative	N. Fitton	158	11.5	N/A
Socialist Alliance	D. Farrell	12	0.9	N/A
Majority		394	28.6	N/A
Turnout		1,378	44.0	–7.8
Registered electors		3,132		
Liberal Democrats hold		Swing	▲12.7	

=== Lache Park ===
Lache Park
Party	Candidate	Votes	%	±%
Labour	D. Hughes*	643	52.2	–12.1
Conservative	R. Robertson	499	40.5	+4.8
Liberal Democrats	D. Simpson	90	7.3	N/A
Majority		144	11.7	N/A
Turnout		1,232	26.5	–2.6
Registered electors		4,655		
Labour hold		Swing	▼8.5	

=== Malpas ===
Malpas
Party	Candidate	Votes	%	±%
Conservative	E. Moore-Dutton*	728	73.8	+38.5
Liberal Democrats	V. Roberts	141	14.3	–0.1
Labour	R. Randall	118	12.0	+6.6
Majority		587	59.5	N/A
Turnout		987	30.1	–4.2
Registered electors		3,283		
Conservative hold		Swing	▲19.3	

=== Newton Brook ===
Newton Brook
Party	Candidate	Votes	%	±%
Conservative	J. Ebo*	530	44.2	+4.8
Liberal Democrats	R. Jordan	527	43.9	+3.4
Labour	R. Teasdale	143	11.9	–8.2
Majority		3	0.3	N/A
Turnout		1,200	39.1	+4.5
Registered electors		3,070		
Conservative hold		Swing	▲0.7	

=== Newton St. Michaels ===
Newton St. Michaels
Party	Candidate	Votes	%	±%
Liberal Democrats	T. Ralph*	505	48.1	–4.3
Labour	L. Barlow	301	28.7	–18.9
Conservative	M. Ebo	243	23.2	N/A
Majority		204	19.4	N/A
Turnout		1,049	38.9	–4.0
Registered electors		2,697		
Liberal Democrats hold		Swing	▲7.3	

=== Saughall ===
Saughall
Party	Candidate	Votes	%	±%
Conservative	J. Storrar	693	50.4	–2.3
Labour	P. Humphrey	595	43.3	+2.2
Liberal Democrats	P. McCabe	87	6.3	+0.1
Majority		98	7.1	N/A
Turnout		1,375	46.7	+1.8
Registered electors		2,942		
Conservative hold		Swing	▼2.3	

=== Tarvin ===
Tarvin
Party	Candidate	Votes	%	±%
Conservative	B. Roberts*	797	70.5	+0.7
Labour	B. Page	179	15.8	–4.0
Liberal Democrats	B. Lockwood	154	13.6	+3.2
Majority		618	54.7	N/A
Turnout		1,130	33.1	–0.7
Registered electors		3,417		
Conservative hold		Swing	▲2.4	

=== Tattenhall ===
Tattenhall
Party	Candidate	Votes	%	±%
Conservative	M. Jones*	678	62.8	+28.5
Liberal Democrats	M. Thompson	260	24.1	+11.4
Labour	A. Pegrum	141	13.1	+7.1
Majority		418	38.7	N/A
Turnout		1,079	36.9	+2.7
Registered electors		2,921		
Conservative hold		Swing	▲8.6	

=== Upton Grange ===
Upton Grange
Party	Candidate	Votes	%	±%
Liberal Democrats	J. Evans*	865	46.9	–6.4
Conservative	G. Roose	593	32.2	+5.3
Labour	P. Griffiths	386	20.9	+1.1
Majority		272	14.8	N/A
Turnout		1,844	35.5	–0.8
Registered electors		5,193		
Liberal Democrats hold		Swing	▼5.9	

=== Upton Westlea ===
Upton Westlea
Party	Candidate	Votes	%	±%
Labour	R. Taylor*	460	42.5	–9.6
Conservative	J. Butler	443	40.9	+10.6
Liberal Democrats	D. Capstick	180	16.6	–1.0
Majority		17	1.6	N/A
Turnout		1,083	35.5	–5.3
Registered electors		3,054		
Labour hold		Swing	▼10.1	

=== Vicars Cross ===
Vicards Cross
Party	Candidate	Votes	%	±%
Liberal Democrats	J. McCabe*	1,020	64.4	–0.2
Conservative	A. Van Der Zwan	338	21.3	+4.8
Labour	K. Jones	226	14.3	–4.6
Majority		682	43.1	N/A
Turnout		1,584	35.8	–1.2
Registered electors		4,428		
Liberal Democrats hold		Swing	▼2.5	

=== Waverton ===
Waverton
Party	Candidate	Votes	%	±%
Liberal Democrats	C. Walley*	461	50.3	–0.9
Conservative	P. Morris	394	43.0	+2.7
Labour	C. Davies	62	6.8	–1.7
Majority		67	7.3	–3.6
Turnout		917	53.0	+0.5
Registered electors		1,729		
Liberal Democrats hold		Swing	▼1.8	
