= Listed buildings in Cotton Edmunds =

Cotton Edmunds is a former civil parish, now in the parish of Christleton, in Cheshire West and Chester, England. It contains two buildings that are recorded in the National Heritage List for England as designated listed buildings, each of which is at Grade II. This grade is the lowest of the three gradings given to listed buildings and is applied to "buildings of national importance and special interest". The listed buildings consist of three packhorse bridges, two of which are designated together.

Name and location	Photograph	Date	Notes
Western bridge 53.18568°N 2.78544°W		Late 18th century (probable)	This is a humpback bridge crossing a drain, constructed in sandstone blocks. It consists of a segmental arch and has a plain parapet. The carriageway consists of stone setts and cobbles.
Central and eastern bridges 53.18611°N 2.78475°W		Late 18th century (probable)	These are two humpback bridges, with the adjoining causeway. The central bridge crosses the main channel of the River Gowy, and the eastern bridge is over a side channel. The bridges are constructed in sandstone blocks, which form segmental arches. Each bridge has a plain parapet.
