= 1998 Chester City Council election =

1998 English local election

← 1996	7 May 1998	1999 →

20 out of 60 seats to Chester City Council 31 seats needed for a majority

	First party	Second party
Party	Labour	Liberal Democrats
Last election	25 seats, 45.5%	18 seats, 25.1%
Seats won	8	5
Seats after	25	17
Seat change	▼2	▼1
Popular vote	9,838	6,246
Percentage	39.7%	25.2%
Swing	▼5.8%	▲0.1%
	Third party	Fourth party
Party	Conservative	Independent
Last election	13 seats, 27.2%	2 seats, 1.9%
Seats won	7	0
Seats after	16	2
Seat change	▲3	Steady
Popular vote	8,427	40
Percentage	34.0%	0.2%
Swing	▲6.8%	▼1.7%
- Winner of each seat at the 1998 Chester City Council election
Council control before election
No overall control
Council control after election
No overall control

The 1998 Chester City Council election took place on 7 May 1998 to elect members of Chester City Council in Cheshire, England. This was on the same day as other local elections.

== Summary ==
=== Election result ===
1998 Chester City Council election
Party	This election			Full council			This election		
Party	Seats	Net	Seats %	Other	Total	Total %	Votes	Votes %	+/−
Labour	8	▼2	40.0	17	25	41.7	9,838	39.7	–5.8
Liberal Democrats	5	▼1	25.0	12	17	28.3	6,246	25.2	+0.1
Conservative	7	▲3	35.0	9	16	26.7	8,427	34.0	+6.8
Independent	0	Steady	0.0	2	2	3.3	40	0.2	–1.7
Ind. Lib Dem	0	Steady	0.0	0	0	0.0	174	0.7	N/A
Ratepayer	0	Steady	0.0	0	0	0.0	85	0.3	±0.0

== Ward results ==
=== Barrow ===
Barrow
Party	Candidate	Votes	%	±%
Conservative	E. Johnson*	756	53.8	+8.3
Liberal Democrats	A. Garman	397	28.3	+10.9
Labour	R. Barlow	252	17.9	–19.2
Majority		359	25.6	+17.2
Turnout		1,405	35.0	–4.3
Registered electors		3,989		
Conservative hold		Swing	▼1.3	

=== Blacon Hall ===
Blacon Hall
Party	Candidate	Votes	%	±%
Labour	J. Price*	668	81.4	–4.8
Conservative	C. Isaac	153	18.6	+8.9
Majority		515	62.7	–13.8
Turnout		821	20.0	–8.6
Registered electors		4,098		
Labour hold		Swing	▼6.9	

=== Boughton ===
Boughton
Party	Candidate	Votes	%	±%
Labour	R. Rudd*	455	59.6	–10.9
Conservative	G. Robinson	228	29.9	+10.0
Liberal Democrats	P. Brett	80	10.5	+0.9
Majority		227	29.8	–20.8
Turnout		763	28.0	–9.6
Registered electors		2,689		
Labour hold		Swing	▼10.5	

=== Boughton Heath ===
Boughton Heath
Party	Candidate	Votes	%	±%
Liberal Democrats	J. Moore	767	46.7	–5.5
Conservative	S. Winsor	527	32.1	+8.9
Labour	M. Laza	349	21.2	–3.4
Majority		240	14.6	–13.0
Turnout		1,643	35.0	–11.0
Registered electors		4,649		
Liberal Democrats hold		Swing	▼7.2	

=== College ===
College
Party	Candidate	Votes	%	±%
Labour	S. Rudd*	758	65.0	–3.6
Conservative	J. Burke	221	19.0	+0.9
Liberal Democrats	J. Indermaur	102	8.7	+0.6
Ratepayer	D. Taylor	85	7.3	+2.2
Majority		537	46.1	–4.4
Turnout		1,166	24.0	–13.0
Registered electors		4,937		
Labour hold		Swing	▼2.3	

=== Curzon ===
Curzon
Party	Candidate	Votes	%	±%
Labour	D. Challen	595	53.8	–2.2
Conservative	S. Robson-Catling	403	36.5	–2.0
Liberal Democrats	J. Brown	107	9.7	+4.3
Majority		192	17.4	±0.0
Turnout		1,105	37.0	–12.6
Registered electors		2,961		
Labour hold		Swing	▼0.1	

=== Dee Point ===
Dee Point
Party	Candidate	Votes	%	±%
Labour	R. Jones*	597	72.5	–10.9
Conservative	J. Jaworzyn	147	17.8	+5.6
Liberal Democrats	M. Carter	80	9.7	+5.3
Majority		450	54.6	–16.7
Turnout		824	19.0	–11.2
Registered electors		4,256		
Labour hold		Swing	▼8.3	

=== Elton ===
Elton
Party	Candidate	Votes	%	±%
Conservative	M. Parker	603	47.1	+9.0
Labour	B. Cowper*	582	45.5	–8.1
Liberal Democrats	G. Ralph	95	7.4	–0.9
Majority		21	1.6	N/A
Turnout		1,280	25.0	–14.0
Registered electors		5,024		
Conservative gain from Labour		Swing	▲8.1	

=== Grosvenor ===
Grosvenor
Party	Candidate	Votes	%	±%
Conservative	C. Robson	794	46.0	+9.7
Labour	L. Barlow*	751	43.5	–9.3
Liberal Democrats	H. Prydderch	181	10.5	–0.4
Majority		43	2.5	N/A
Turnout		1,726	39.0	–9.9
Registered electors		4,406		
Conservative gain from Labour		Swing	▲9.5	

=== Hoole ===
Hoole
Party	Candidate	Votes	%	±%
Labour	G. Kelly	946	48.1	+3.1
Liberal Democrats	N. McGlinchey	864	43.9	–6.5
Conservative	H. Wood	157	8.0	+3.3
Majority		82	4.2	N/A
Turnout		1,967	41.0	–7.2
Registered electors		4,849		
Labour gain from Liberal Democrats		Swing	▲4.8	

=== Mollington ===
Mollington
Party	Candidate	Votes	%	±%
Conservative	B. Crowe*	411	59.7	+8.2
Ind. Lib Dem	J. Pemberton	174	25.3	N/A
Labour	V. Randall	63	9.2	–4.1
Independent	M. Reeves	40	5.8	N/A
Majority		237	34.4	+18.2
Turnout		688	34.0	–10.0
Registered electors		2,042		
Conservative hold				

=== Newton ===
Newton
Party	Candidate	Votes	%	±%
Liberal Democrats	M. Garrod*	740	50.6	+3.8
Conservative	J. Ebo	454	31.0	+3.1
Labour	W. Megarrell	269	18.4	–6.9
Majority		286	19.5	+0.6
Turnout		1,463	36.0	–10.2
Registered electors		4,047		
Liberal Democrats hold		Swing	▲0.4	

=== Plas Newton ===
Plas Newton
Party	Candidate	Votes	%	±%
Liberal Democrats	M. Hale*	724	52.7	+6.8
Labour	J. Stiles	446	32.4	–9.5
Conservative	C. Power	205	14.9	+2.8
Majority		278	20.2	+16.2
Turnout		1,375	38.0	–8.3
Registered electors		3,617		
Liberal Democrats hold		Swing	▲8.2	

=== Sealand ===
Sealand
Party	Candidate	Votes	%	±%
Labour	R. Cross*	704	77.5	–1.2
Conservative	M. Poole	204	22.5	+8.3
Majority		500	55.1	–9.4
Turnout		908	23.0	–12.0
Registered electors		3,909		
Labour hold		Swing	▼4.8	

=== Tarvin ===
Tarvin
Party	Candidate	Votes	%	±%
Conservative	M. Johnson*	634	69.7	+16.2
Labour	B. Page	197	21.7	–16.7
Liberal Democrats	T. Roberts	78	8.6	+0.5
Majority		437	48.1	+33.0
Turnout		909	27.0	–6.7
Registered electors		3,367		
Conservative hold		Swing	▲16.5	

=== Tilston ===
Tilston
Party	Candidate	Votes	%	±%
Conservative	N. Ritchie*	478	86.8	+16.4
Liberal Democrats	D. Nall	37	6.7	N/A
Labour	E. Price	36	6.5	–23.1
Majority		441	80.0	+39.2
Turnout		551	39.0	–4.0
Registered electors		1,416		
Conservative hold				

=== Upton Grange ===
Upton Grange
Party	Candidate	Votes	%	±%
Liberal Democrats	D. Evans*	766	66.4	+10.5
Conservative	G. Roose	244	21.2	–4.9
Labour	F. Baker	143	12.4	–5.6
Majority		522	45.3	+15.5
Turnout		1,153	35.0	–9.7
Registered electors		3,339		
Liberal Democrats hold		Swing	▲7.7	

=== Upton Heath ===
Upton Heath
Party	Candidate	Votes	%	±%
Labour	K. Keegan	799	50.8	–1.7
Conservative	J. Butler	495	31.5	–1.3
Liberal Democrats	A. Evans	278	17.7	+6.7
Majority		304	19.3	–0.3
Turnout		1,572	39.0	–10.2
Registered electors		4,035		
Labour hold		Swing	▲0.2	

=== Vicars Cross ===
Vicars Cross
Party	Candidate	Votes	%	±%
Liberal Democrats	G. Proctor*	950	61.7	+10.9
Conservative	C. Dodman	301	19.5	+4.0
Labour	C. Jones	289	18.8	–14.8
Majority		649	42.1	+24.9
Turnout		1,540	37.0	–9.3
Registered electors		4,146		
Liberal Democrats hold		Swing	▲3.5	

=== Westminster ===
Westminster
Party	Candidate	Votes	%	±%
Conservative	R. Short	1,012	51.9	+9.2
Labour	D. Hughes*	939	48.1	–0.7
Majority		73	3.7	N/A
Turnout		1,951	36.0	–9.3
Registered electors		5,395		
Conservative gain from Labour		Swing	▲5.0	
