= Kings Marsh =

Former civil parish in Cheshire, England

Coordinates: 53.096°N 2.845°W

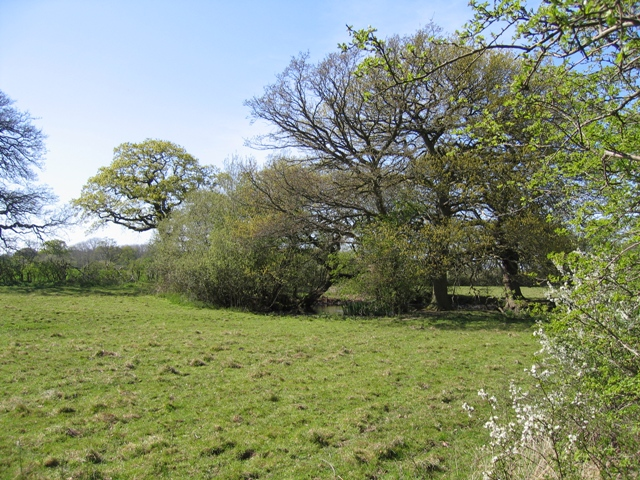
- Marl pit

- Location within Cheshire
- Population: 30 (2001)
- OS grid reference: SJ4355
- Civil parish: Farndon
- Unitary authority: Cheshire West and Chester
- Ceremonial county: Cheshire
- Region: North West
- Country: England
- Sovereign state: United Kingdom
- Post town: CHESTER
- Postcode district: CH3
- Dialling code: 01829
- Police: Cheshire
- Fire: Cheshire
- Ambulance: North West
- UK Parliament: Chester South and Eddisbury

Kings Marsh is a former civil parish, now in the parish of Farndon, in the borough of Cheshire West and Chester and ceremonial county of Cheshire in England. In 2001 it had a population of 30.

== History ==
Kingsmarsh was formerly an extra-parochial tract, in 1858 Kings Marsh became a separate civil parish, on 1 April 2015 the parish was abolished and merged with Farndon. From 1974 to 2009 it was in Chester non-metropolitan district.
