= 2002 Chester City Council election =

2002 English local election

← 2000	2 May 2002	2003 →

21 out of 60 seats to Chester City Council 31 seats needed for a majority

	First party	Second party
Party	Labour	Liberal Democrats
Last election	21 seats, 29.3%	19 seats, 30.8%
Seats won	8	6
Seats after	20	20
Seat change	▼1	▲1
Popular vote	8,811	6,472
Percentage	34.4%	25.3%
Swing	▲5.1%	▼5.5%
	Third party	Fourth party
Party	Conservative	Independent
Last election	17 seats, 39.6%	3 seats, 0.0%
Seats won	7	0
Seats after	17	3
Seat change	Steady	Steady
Popular vote	10,057	274
Percentage	39.3%	1.1%
Swing	▼0.3%	N/A
- Winner of each seat at the 2002 Chester City Council election
Council control before election
No overall control
Council control after election
No overall control

The 2002 Chester City Council election took place on 2 May 2002 to elect members of Chester City Council in Cheshire, England. This was on the same day as other local elections.

== Summary ==
=== Election result ===
2002 Chester City Council election
Party	This election			Full council			This election		
Party	Seats	Net	Seats %	Other	Total	Total %	Votes	Votes %	+/−
Labour	8	▼1	38.1	12	20	33.3	8,811	34.4	+5.1
Liberal Democrats	6	▲1	28.6	14	20	33.3	6,472	25.3	–5.5
Conservative	7	Steady	33.3	10	17	28.3	10,057	39.3	–0.3
Independent	0	Steady	0.0	3	3	5.0	274	1.1	N/A

== Ward results ==
=== Blacon Hall ===
Blacon Hall
Party	Candidate	Votes	%	±%
Labour	Lillian Price*	919	74.8	+9.7
Conservative	Charles Isaac	310	25.2	–0.9
Majority		609	49.6	+10.6
Turnout		1,229	22.2	+3.5
Registered electors		5,537		
Labour hold		Swing	▲5.3	

=== Blacon Lodge ===
Blacon Lodge
Party	Candidate	Votes	%	±%
Labour	Marie Nelson*	743	78.8	+13.5
Conservative	John Burke	200	21.2	–3.1
Majority		543	57.6	+16.6
Turnout		943	23.9	+4.0
Registered electors		3,943		
Labour hold		Swing	▲8.3	

=== Boughton ===
Boughton
Party	Candidate	Votes	%	±%
Labour	Robert Harrison	598	59.7	–0.1
Conservative	Alexandra van der Zwan	277	27.6	+1.9
Liberal Democrats	Kenneth Prydderch	127	12.7	–1.8
Majority		321	32.0	N/A
Turnout		1,002	35.4	+1.8
Registered electors		2,831		
Labour hold		Swing	▼1.0	

=== Christleton ===
Christleton
Party	Candidate	Votes	%	±%
Conservative	Brian Bailey*	749	54.1	–3.0
Liberal Democrats	Katrina Hughes	424	30.6	+16.4
Labour	Christine Davies	212	15.3	–13.4
Majority		325	23.5	N/A
Turnout		1,385	40.8	+1.2
Registered electors		3,391		
Conservative hold		Swing	▼9.7	

=== City & St. Annes ===
City & St. Annes
Party	Candidate	Votes	%	±%
Labour	Gwyneth Cooper*	429	56.1	+4.9
Conservative	Peter Morris	210	27.5	–5.5
Liberal Democrats	David Simpson	90	11.8	+3.2
Independent	Dora Taylor	36	4.7	–2.5
Majority		219	28.6	+10.4
Turnout		765	28.9	–0.7
Registered electors		2,645		
Labour hold		Swing	▲5.2	

=== College ===
College
Party	Candidate	Votes	%	±%
Labour	Sandra Rudd*	476	52.0	–2.6
Liberal Democrats	David Mead	228	24.9	+5.2
Conservative	Joan Price	211	23.1	–2.7
Majority		248	27.1	–1.7
Turnout		915	20.0	–0.1
Registered electors		4,577		
Labour hold		Swing	▼3.9	

=== Curzon & Westminster ===
Curzon & Westminster
Party	Candidate	Votes	%	±%
Conservative	Michael Poole*	940	64.0	–5.0
Labour	Zoe Langmead	357	24.3	+2.0
Liberal Democrats	Heather Prydderch	171	11.6	+2.8
Majority		583	39.7	N/A
Turnout		1,468	43.5	–1.6
Registered electors		3,372		
Conservative hold		Swing	▼3.5	

=== Elton ===
Elton
Party	Candidate	Votes	%	±%
Labour	David Bennett*	460	55.2	–10.0
Conservative	Andrew Merrill	289	34.7	–0.1
Liberal Democrats	Barbara Yakan	84	10.1	N/A
Majority		171	20.5	N/A
Turnout		833	25.3	–5.1
Registered electors		3,289		
Labour hold		Swing	▼5.0	

=== Handbridge & St. Marys ===
Handbridge & St. Marys
Party	Candidate	Votes	%	±%
Labour	Ruth Davidson*	926	50.0	+10.3
Conservative	Philip Edwards	760	41.0	–12.0
Liberal Democrats	Trevor Jones	166	9.0	+1.8
Majority		166	9.0	N/A
Turnout		1,852	54.2	+0.1
Registered electors		3,418		
Labour hold		Swing	▲11.2	

=== Hoole All Saints ===
Hoole All Saints
Party	Candidate	Votes	%	±%
Liberal Democrats	Robert Thompson	502	53.1	–8.0
Independent	Steven Howe	238	25.2	N/A
Labour	Boudewina Meijer	205	21.7	–17.2
Majority		264	27.9	N/A
Turnout		945	41.9	+1.5
Registered electors		2,553		
Liberal Democrats hold				

=== Kelsall ===
Kelsall
Party	Candidate	Votes	%	±%
Liberal Democrats	Anthony Castle	707	47.3	+19.0
Conservative	Hugo Deynem*	687	45.9	+15.6
Labour	Jill Byrne	102	6.8	–1.0
Majority		20	1.3	N/A
Turnout		1,496	52.0	+10.8
Registered electors		2,877		
Liberal Democrats gain from Conservative		Swing	▲3.4	

=== Lache Park ===
Lache Park
Party	Candidate	Votes	%	±%
Labour	Elizabeth Mercer*	773	60.6	+8.4
Conservative	Max Drury	503	39.4	–1.1
Majority		270	21.2	+9.5
Turnout		1,276	28.5	+2.0
Registered electors		4,474		
Labour hold		Swing	▲4.8	

=== Mollington ===
Mollington
Party	Candidate	Votes	%	±%
Conservative	Brian Crowe*	465	79.2	+8.1
Labour	Deborah Forrester-Roberts	70	11.9	+3.3
Liberal Democrats	Anne Mead	52	8.9	–11.4
Majority		395	67.3	+16.4
Turnout		587	38.6	–1.1
Registered electors		1,521		
Conservative hold		Swing	▲2.4	

=== Newton St. Michaels ===
Newton St. Michaels
Party	Candidate	Votes	%	±%
Liberal Democrats	Gaynor Ralph	513	45.3	–2.8
Labour	Peter Griffiths	404	35.7	+7.0
Conservative	Miriam Ebo	215	19.0	–4.2
Majority		109	9.6	–9.8
Turnout		1,132	42.7	+3.8
Registered electors		2,650		
Liberal Democrats hold		Swing	▼4.9	

=== Saughall ===
Saughall
Party	Candidate	Votes	%	±%
Conservative	Richard Storrar*	628	54.8	+4.4
Labour	Thomas Andrews	419	36.6	–6.7
Liberal Democrats	Gillian Jordan	98	8.6	+2.3
Majority		209	18.3	+11.2
Turnout		1,145	39.3	–7.4
Registered electors		2,912		
Conservative hold		Swing	▲5.6	

=== Tarvin ===
Tarvin
Party	Candidate	Votes	%	±%
Conservative	Charles Plenderleath*	833	72.1	+1.6
Labour	Anthony Pegrum	194	16.8	+1.0
Liberal Democrats	Andrew Hyde	129	11.2	–2.4
Majority		639	55.3	+0.6
Turnout		1,156	34.3	+1.2
Registered electors		3,373		
Conservative hold		Swing	▲0.3	

=== Tilston ===
Tilston
Party	Candidate	Votes	%	±%
Conservative	Neil Ritchie	631	88.6	±0.0
Liberal Democrats	Vera Roberts	55	7.7	+2.5
Labour	Ethel Price	26	3.7	–2.5
Majority		576	80.9	–1.5
Turnout		712	44.0	+1.5
Registered electors		1,616		
Conservative hold		Swing	▼1.3	

=== Upton Grange ===
Upton Grange
Party	Candidate	Votes	%	±%
Liberal Democrats	David Evans*	1,000	50.0	+3.1
Conservative	Gerald Rose	622	31.1	–1.1
Labour	Brenda Southward	377	18.9	–2.0
Majority		378	18.9	+4.1
Turnout		1,999	39.1	+3.6
Registered electors		5,118		
Liberal Democrats hold		Swing	▲2.1	

=== Upton Westlea ===
Upton Westlea
Party	Candidate	Votes	%	±%
Conservative	Caroline Mosley	655	45.9	+5.0
Labour	Steven Duffus*	588	41.2	–1.3
Liberal Democrats	David Capstick	183	12.8	–3.8
Majority		67	4.7	N/A
Turnout		1,426	46.5	+11.0
Registered electors		3,069		
Conservative gain from Labour		Swing	▲3.2	

=== Vicars Cross ===
Vicars Cross (2 seats due to by-election)
Party	Candidate	Votes	%
Liberal Democrats	Kenneth Holding*	996	58.0
Liberal Democrats	Paul Cheetham	947	55.2
Conservative	Peter Moore-Dutton	459	26.7
Conservative	Charles Dodman	413	24.1
Labour	Anne Qualter	271	15.8
Labour	Sara Barnsley	262	15.3
Turnout		1,716	38.5
Registered electors		4,456	
Liberal Democrats hold			
Liberal Democrats hold			
