= 2003 Chester City Council election =

2003 English local election

| ← 2002 | 1 May 2003 | 2004 → |

21 out of 60 seats to Chester City Council 31 seats needed for a majority

| | First party | Second party |
|---|---|---|
| Party | Liberal Democrats | Labour |
| Last election | 20 seats, 25.3% | 21 seats, 34.4% |
| Seats won | 8 | 7 |
| Seats after | 21 | 20 |
| Seat change | ▲1 | Steady |
| Popular vote | 6,765 | 6,334 |
| Percentage | 30.3% | 28.4% |
| Swing | ▲5.0% | ▼6.0% |
| | Third party | Fourth party |
| Party | Conservative | Independent |
| Last election | 17 seats, 39.3% | 3 seats, 1.1% |
| Seats won | 5 | 1 |
| Seats after | 18 | 1 |
| Seat change | ▲1 | ▼2 |
| Popular vote | 7,423 | 1,211 |
| Percentage | 33.2% | 5.4% |
| Swing | ▼6.1% | ▲4.3% |
- Winner of each seat at the 2003 Chester City Council election
Council control before election
No overall control
Council control after election
No overall control

The 2003 Chester City Council election took place on 1 May 2003 to elect members of Chester City Council in Cheshire, England. This was on the same day as other local elections.

== Summary ==
=== Election result ===
2003 Chester City Council election
| Party | This election | | | Full council | | | This election | | |
| Party | Seats | Net | Seats % | Other | Total | Total % | Votes | Votes % | +/− |
|---|---|---|---|---|---|---|---|---|---|
| Liberal Democrats | 8 | ▲1 | 38.1 | 13 | 21 | 35.0 | 6,765 | 30.3 | +5.0 |
| Labour | 7 | Steady | 33.3 | 13 | 20 | 33.3 | 6,334 | 28.4 | –6.0 |
| Conservative | 5 | ▲1 | 23.8 | 13 | 18 | 30.0 | 7,423 | 33.2 | –6.1 |
| Independent | 1 | ▼2 | 4.8 | 0 | 1 | 1.7 | 1,211 | 5.4 | +4.3 |
| UKIP | 0 | Steady | 0.0 | 0 | 0 | 0.0 | 328 | 1.5 | N/A |
| Green | 0 | Steady | 0.0 | 0 | 0 | 0.0 | 204 | 0.9 | N/A |
| CPA | 0 | Steady | 0.0 | 0 | 0 | 0.0 | 75 | 0.3 | N/A |

== Ward results ==
=== Barrow ===
Barrow
| Party | Candidate | Votes | % | ±% |
|---|---|---|---|---|
| Conservative | Eleanor Johnson* | 465 | 78.0 | +6.0 |
| Labour | Benjamin Page | 68 | 11.4 | –6.0 |
| Liberal Democrats | Barry Lockwood | 63 | 10.6 | ±0.0 |
| Majority | | 397 | 66.6 | +12.0 |
| Turnout | | 596 | 41.3 | –2.0 |
| Registered electors | | 1,442 | | |
| Conservative hold | | Swing | ▲6.0 | |

=== Blacon Hall ===
Blacon Hall
| Party | Candidate | Votes | % | ±% |
|---|---|---|---|---|
| Labour | John Price* | 758 | 66.0 | –8.8 |
| UKIP | Desmond Dodd | 164 | 14.3 | N/A |
| Conservative | Charles Isaac | 150 | 13.1 | –12.1 |
| Liberal Democrats | David Simpson | 76 | 6.6 | N/A |
| Majority | | 594 | 51.7 | +2.1 |
| Turnout | | 1,148 | 21.3 | –0.9 |
| Registered electors | | 5,401 | | |
| Labour hold | | | | |

=== Blacon Lodge ===
Blacon Lodge
| Party | Candidate | Votes | % | ±% |
|---|---|---|---|---|
| Labour | Reginald Jones* | 557 | 73.7 | –5.1 |
| UKIP | Leslie Ingram | 113 | 14.9 | N/A |
| Liberal Democrats | Barbara Yakan | 86 | 11.4 | N/A |
| Majority | | 444 | 58.7 | +1.1 |
| Turnout | | 756 | 19.4 | –4.5 |
| Registered electors | | 3,892 | | |
| Labour hold | | | | |

=== Boughton ===
Boughton
| Party | Candidate | Votes | % | ±% |
|---|---|---|---|---|
| Labour | Robert Rudd* | 449 | 52.8 | –6.9 |
| Conservative | Michael Drinkwater | 243 | 28.6 | +1.0 |
| Liberal Democrats | James McCabe | 94 | 11.0 | –1.7 |
| Green | Helen Counsell | 65 | 7.6 | N/A |
| Majority | | 206 | 24.2 | –7.8 |
| Turnout | | 851 | 30.9 | –4.5 |
| Registered electors | | 2,757 | | |
| Labour hold | | Swing | ▼4.0 | |

=== Boughton Heath ===
Boughton Heath
| Party | Candidate | Votes | % | ±% |
|---|---|---|---|---|
| Liberal Democrats | Ann Farrell* | 713 | 53.2 | +6.7 |
| Conservative | Paul Stewart | 500 | 37.3 | –1.4 |
| Labour | Ethel Price | 126 | 9.4 | –5.4 |
| Majority | | 213 | 15.9 | +8.1 |
| Turnout | | 1,339 | 43.6 | +7.7 |
| Registered electors | | 3,071 | | |
| Liberal Democrats hold | | Swing | ▲4.1 | |

=== Christleton ===
Christleton
| Party | Candidate | Votes | % | ±% |
|---|---|---|---|---|
| Conservative | John Boughton* | 691 | 56.0 | +1.9 |
| Liberal Democrats | Katrina Hughes | 378 | 30.6 | ±0.0 |
| Labour | Christine Davies | 165 | 13.4 | –1.9 |
| Majority | | 313 | 25.4 | +1.9 |
| Turnout | | 1,234 | 36.7 | –4.1 |
| Registered electors | | 3,071 | | |
| Conservative hold | | Swing | ▲1.0 | |

=== College ===
College
| Party | Candidate | Votes | % | ±% |
|---|---|---|---|---|
| Labour | Janet Black* | 385 | 43.0 | –9.0 |
| Liberal Democrats | David Mead | 223 | 24.9 | ±0.0 |
| Conservative | Trudy Ryall-Harvey | 200 | 22.3 | –0.8 |
| Green | Stephen Dorrans | 87 | 9.7 | N/A |
| Majority | | 162 | 18.1 | –9.0 |
| Turnout | | 895 | 19.2 | –0.8 |
| Registered electors | | 4,659 | | |
| Labour hold | | Swing | ▼4.5 | |

=== Curzon & Westminster ===
Curzon & Westminster
| Party | Candidate | Votes | % | ±% |
|---|---|---|---|---|
| Conservative | Richard Short* | 927 | 64.9 | +0.9 |
| Labour | Zoe Langmead | 260 | 18.2 | –6.1 |
| Liberal Democrats | Trevor Jones | 241 | 16.9 | +5.3 |
| Majority | | 667 | 46.7 | +7.0 |
| Turnout | | 1,428 | 42.1 | –1.4 |
| Registered electors | | 3,390 | | |
| Conservative hold | | Swing | ▲3.5 | |

=== Elton ===
Elton (2 seats due to by-election)
| Party | Candidate | Votes | % |
|---|---|---|---|
| Labour | Barry Cowper* | 519 | 80.3 |
| Labour | Mark Peterson | 452 | 70.0 |
| Conservative | Andrew Merrill | 321 | 49.7 |
| Turnout | | 1,292 | 39.1 |
| Registered electors | | 3,304 | |
| Labour hold | | | |
| Labour hold | | | |

=== Hoole All Saints ===
Hoole All Saints
| Party | Candidate | Votes | % | ±% |
|---|---|---|---|---|
| Liberal Democrats | Jean Nuttall* | 459 | 59.8 | +6.7 |
| Labour | Hilary Harrison | 171 | 22.3 | +0.6 |
| Conservative | John Burke | 66 | 8.6 | N/A |
| CPA | Peter Fabian | 47 | 6.1 | N/A |
| UKIP | Jill Pears | 25 | 3.3 | N/A |
| Majority | | 288 | 37.5 | +9.6 |
| Turnout | | 768 | 30.4 | –11.5 |
| Registered electors | | 2,525 | | |
| Liberal Democrats hold | | Swing | ▲3.1 | |

=== Hoole Groves ===
Hoole Groves
| Party | Candidate | Votes | % | ±% |
|---|---|---|---|---|
| Liberal Democrats | Beverly Eaton | 658 | 43.7 | –14.4 |
| Labour | Alexander Black | 606 | 40.3 | +10.8 |
| Conservative | Christina Alexander | 161 | 10.7 | –0.8 |
| Green | Helen Trask | 52 | 3.5 | N/A |
| CPA | Stephen Allen | 28 | 1.9 | N/A |
| Majority | | 52 | 3.5 | –25.1 |
| Turnout | | 1,505 | 48.9 | +4.9 |
| Registered electors | | 3,080 | | |
| Liberal Democrats hold | | Swing | ▼12.6 | |

=== Huntington ===
Huntington
| Party | Candidate | Votes | % | ±% |
|---|---|---|---|---|
| Liberal Democrats | John Moore* | 250 | 33.3 | –9.7 |
| Independent | Mark Williams | 194 | 25.9 | N/A |
| Conservative | Alexandra van der Zwan | 190 | 25.3 | –6.6 |
| Labour | Ann Treloar | 90 | 12.0 | –13.1 |
| UKIP | Allan Weddell | 26 | 3.5 | N/A |
| Majority | | 56 | 7.5 | –3.6 |
| Turnout | | 750 | 49.3 | +6.1 |
| Registered electors | | 1,520 | | |
| Liberal Democrats hold | | | | |

=== Kelsall ===
Kelsall
| Party | Candidate | Votes | % | ±% |
|---|---|---|---|---|
| Liberal Democrats | Joan Fairhurst | 767 | 52.0 | +4.7 |
| Conservative | Pauline Tilley* | 624 | 42.3 | –3.6 |
| Labour | Paul Cornwell | 85 | 5.8 | –1.0 |
| Majority | | 143 | 9.7 | +8.4 |
| Turnout | | 1,476 | 51.8 | –0.2 |
| Registered electors | | 2,850 | | |
| Liberal Democrats gain from Independent | | Swing | ▲4.2 | |

=== Lache Park ===
Lache Park
| Party | Candidate | Votes | % | ±% |
|---|---|---|---|---|
| Labour | David Challen* | 712 | 56.9 | –3.7 |
| Conservative | Max Drury | 291 | 23.3 | –16.1 |
| Independent | Arthur Harada | 143 | 11.4 | N/A |
| Liberal Democrats | Pauline McCabe | 105 | 8.4 | N/A |
| Majority | | 421 | 33.7 | +12.5 |
| Turnout | | 1,251 | 28.6 | +0.1 |
| Registered electors | | 4,366 | | |
| Labour hold | | Swing | ▲6.3 | |

=== Malpas ===
Malpas
| Party | Candidate | Votes | % | ±% |
|---|---|---|---|---|
| Conservative | Keith Ebben | 628 | 58.9 | –14.9 |
| Liberal Democrats | Robert Flannery | 348 | 32.6 | +18.3 |
| Labour | Margaret Violet | 90 | 8.4 | –3.6 |
| Majority | | 280 | 26.3 | –33.2 |
| Turnout | | 1,066 | 33.3 | +3.2 |
| Registered electors | | 3,198 | | |
| Conservative gain from Independent | | Swing | ▼16.6 | |

=== Mickle Trafford ===
Mickle Trafford
| Party | Candidate | Votes | % | ±% |
|---|---|---|---|---|
| Conservative | Margaret Parker* | 512 | 79.1 | +4.7 |
| Labour | Brian Roberts | 80 | 12.4 | –13.2 |
| Liberal Democrats | Vera Roberts | 55 | 8.5 | N/A |
| Majority | | 432 | 66.8 | +17.9 |
| Turnout | | 647 | 37.3 | +3.0 |
| Registered electors | | 1,736 | | |
| Conservative hold | | Swing | ▲9.0 | |

=== Newton Brook ===
Newton Brook
| Party | Candidate | Votes | % | ±% |
|---|---|---|---|---|
| Liberal Democrats | Robert Jordan* | 526 | 47.7 | +3.8 |
| Conservative | Karen Bardsley | 381 | 34.5 | –9.7 |
| Labour | Peter Griffiths | 196 | 17.8 | +5.9 |
| Majority | | 145 | 13.1 | N/A |
| Turnout | | 1,103 | 36.4 | –2.7 |
| Registered electors | | 3,031 | | |
| Liberal Democrats hold | | Swing | ▲6.8 | |

=== Tattenhall ===
Tattenhall
| Party | Candidate | Votes | % | ±% |
|---|---|---|---|---|
| Independent | James Haynes* | 874 | 87.8 | N/A |
| Labour | Anthony Pegrum | 121 | 12.2 | –0.9 |
| Majority | | 753 | 75.7 | N/A |
| Turnout | | 995 | 32.8 | –4.1 |
| Registered electors | | 3,035 | | |
| Independent hold | | | | |

=== Upton Grange ===
Upton Grange
| Party | Candidate | Votes | % | ±% |
|---|---|---|---|---|
| Liberal Democrats | Colin Bain* | 864 | 51.6 | +1.6 |
| Conservative | Gerald Roose | 547 | 32.7 | +1.6 |
| Labour | Brenda Southward | 264 | 15.8 | –3.2 |
| Majority | | 317 | 18.9 | ±0.0 |
| Turnout | | 1,675 | 33.6 | –5.5 |
| Registered electors | | 4,984 | | |
| Liberal Democrats hold | | Swing | 0.0 | |

=== Vicars Cross ===
Vicars Cross
| Party | Candidate | Votes | % | ±% |
|---|---|---|---|---|
| Liberal Democrats | Graham Proctor* | 859 | 54.9 | +2.8 |
| Conservative | Peter Moore-Dutton | 526 | 33.6 | –7.0 |
| Labour | Sara Barnsley | 180 | 11.5 | +4.2 |
| Majority | | 333 | 21.3 | N/A |
| Turnout | | 1,726 | 34.9 | –3.6 |
| Registered electors | | 4,483 | | |
| Liberal Democrats hold | | Swing | ▲4.9 | |
