= Cotton Edmunds =

Former civil parish in Cheshire, England

Coordinates: 53.19°N 2.805°W

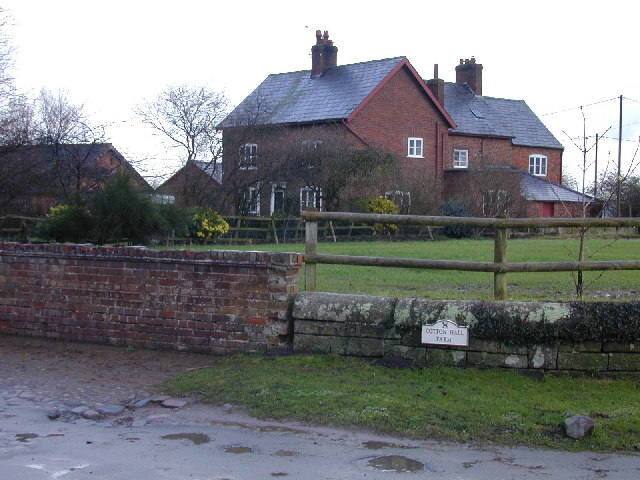
- Cotton Hall Farm

- Location within Cheshire
- Population: 25 (2001)
- OS grid reference: SJ4666
- Civil parish: Christleton
- Unitary authority: Cheshire West and Chester
- Ceremonial county: Cheshire
- Region: North West
- Country: England
- Sovereign state: United Kingdom
- Post town: CHESTER
- Postcode district: CH3
- Dialling code: 01244
- Police: Cheshire
- Fire: Cheshire
- Ambulance: North West
- UK Parliament: Chester South and Eddisbury

Cotton Edmunds is a former civil parish, now in the parish of Christleton, in the borough of Cheshire West and Chester and ceremonial county of Cheshire in England. In 2001 it had a population of 25. Cotton-Edmunds was formerly a township in the parish of Christleton, in 1866 Cotton Edmunds became a separate civil parish, on 1 April 2015 the parish was abolished and merged with Christleton.

== See also ==
- Listed buildings in Cotton Edmunds
