= 2006 Chester City Council election =

2006 English local election

- 4 May 2006

20 out of 60 seats to Chester City Council 31 seats needed for a majority

	First party	Second party
Party	Conservative	Liberal Democrats
Last election	20 seats, 39.6%	22 seats, 32.7%
Seats won	12	3
Seats after	25	20
Seat change	▲5	▼2
Popular vote	13,006	6,043
Percentage	49.2%	22.9%
Swing	▲9.6%	▼9.8%
	Third party	Fourth party
Party	Labour	Independent
Last election	17 seats, 26.2%	1 seat, 1.1%
Seats won	5	0
Seats after	14	1
Seat change	▼3	Steady
Popular vote	6,470	168
Percentage	24.5%	0.6%
Swing	▼1.7%	▼0.5%
- Winner of each seat at the 2006 Chester City Council election
Council control before election
No overall control
Council control after election
No overall control

The 2006 Chester City Council election took place on 4 May 2006 to elect members of Chester City Council in Cheshire, England. This was on the same day as other local elections.

== Summary ==
=== Election result ===
2006 Chester City Council election
Party	This election			Full council			This election		
Party	Seats	Net	Seats %	Other	Total	Total %	Votes	Votes %	+/−
Conservative	12	▲5	60.0	13	25	41.7	13,006	49.2	+9.6
Liberal Democrats	3	▼2	15.0	17	20	33.3	6,043	22.9	–9.8
Labour	5	▼3	25.0	9	14	23.3	6,470	24.5	–1.7
Independent	0	Steady	0.0	1	1	1.7	168	0.6	–0.5
Green	0	Steady	0.0	0	0	0.0	428	1.6	+1.1
UKIP	0	Steady	0.0	0	0	0.0	303	1.1	N/A

== Ward results ==
=== Blacon Hall ===
Blacon Hall
Party	Candidate	Votes	%	±%
Labour	Norman Stainthorp	714	53.5	–4.4
Conservative	Charles Isaac	391	29.3	+4.1
Liberal Democrats	David Simpson	230	17.2	+0.4
Majority		323	24.2	–8.5
Turnout		1,335	24.1	–12.5
Registered electors		5,577		
Labour hold		Swing	▼4.3	

=== Blacon Lodge ===
Blacon Lodge
Party	Candidate	Votes	%	±%
Labour	Marie Nelson*	565	58.0	–0.8
Conservative	Colin McAlister	281	28.9	+4.8
UKIP	Allan Waddell	128	13.1	N/A
Majority		284	29.2	–5.4
Turnout		974	25.2	–12.1
Registered electors		3,912		
Labour hold		Swing	▼2.8	

=== Boughton ===
Boughton
Party	Candidate	Votes	%	±%
Labour	Susan Atkinson	492	43.4	–9.4
Conservative	Sharon Tyrrell	436	38.4	+9.8
Liberal Democrats	Joanne Crotty	206	18.2	+7.2
Majority		56	4.9	–19.3
Turnout		1,134	36.8	–5.9
Registered electors		3,098		
Labour hold		Swing	▼9.6	

=== Christleton ===
Christleton
Party	Candidate	Votes	%	±%
Conservative	Brain Bailey*	882	61.0	+5.0
Liberal Democrats	Margaret Beith	202	14.0	–16.6
Labour	Stephen Davies	193	13.4	±0.0
Independent	Brian Goodall	168	11.6	N/A
Majority		680	47.1	+21.7
Turnout		1,445	43.7	+7.0
Registered electors		3,354		
Conservative hold		Swing	▲10.8	

=== City & St. Annes ===
City & St. Annes
Party	Candidate	Votes	%	±%
Labour	Gwyneth Cooper*	457	45.6	+6.9
Conservative	Mark Williams	427	42.6	+2.1
Liberal Democrats	Gillian Jordan	85	8.5	–12.3
UKIP	Roger Croston	33	3.3	N/A
Majority		30	3.0	N/A
Turnout		1,002	36.2	–3.7
Registered electors		2,785		
Labour hold		Swing	▲2.4	

=== College ===
College
Party	Candidate	Votes	%	±%
Labour	Sandra Rudd*	394	34.7	+6.7
Liberal Democrats	Kenneth Hodd	316	27.8	–5.1
Conservative	Olya Rose	287	25.3	–2.7
Green	Adrian Carr	138	12.2	+1.0
Majority		78	6.9	N/A
Turnout		1,135	23.3	–10.6
Registered electors		4,905		
Labour hold		Swing	▲5.9	

=== Curzon & Westminster ===
Curzon & Westminster
Party	Candidate	Votes	%	±%
Conservative	Max Drury	1,047	62.8	–2.1
Liberal Democrats	Allan Stobie	297	17.8	+0.9
Labour	Philip Tate	247	14.8	–3.4
UKIP	John Moore	76	4.6	N/A
Majority		750	45.0	–1.7
Turnout		1,667	50.5	+8.4
Registered electors		3,348		
Conservative hold		Swing	▼1.5	

=== Elton ===
Elton
Party	Candidate	Votes	%	±%
Conservative	Jeremy Langdon	544	52.5	+14.3
Labour	Mark Peterson*	492	47.5	–14.3
Majority		52	5.0	N/A
Turnout		1,036	30.8	–8.3
Registered electors		3,402		
Conservative gain from Labour		Swing	▲14.3	

=== Handbridge & St. Marys ===
Handbridge & St. Marys
Party	Candidate	Votes	%	±%
Conservative	Razia Daniels	992	57.4	+5.5
Labour	Alexandra Tate	474	27.4	–9.1
Liberal Democrats	Trevor Jones	195	11.3	–0.3
UKIP	David Scott	66	3.8	N/A
Majority		518	30.0	+14.5
Turnout		1,727	51.8	–10.4
Registered electors		3,355		
Conservative gain from Labour		Swing	▲7.3	

=== Hoole All Saints ===
Hoole All Saints
Party	Candidate	Votes	%	±%
Liberal Democrats	Robert Thompson*	473	54.9	–4.9
Conservative	Peter Fabian	159	18.4	+9.8
Labour	Hilary Harrison	133	15.4	–6.9
Green	Janet Dutton	97	11.3	N/A
Majority		314	36.4	–1.1
Turnout		862	33.0	+2.6
Registered electors		2,612		
Liberal Democrats hold		Swing	▼7.4	

=== Kelsall ===
Kelsall
Party	Candidate	Votes	%	±%
Liberal Democrats	Andrew Garman	809	49.2	–2.8
Conservative	Hugo Deynam	749	45.6	+3.3
Labour	Ian Irving	86	5.2	–0.6
Majority		60	3.6	–6.1
Turnout		1,644	57.6	+5.8
Registered electors		2,868		
Liberal Democrats hold		Swing	▼3.1	

=== Lache Park ===
Lache Park
Party	Candidate	Votes	%	±%
Conservative	Arthur Harada	866	53.5	+29.5
Labour	Jane Mercer*	589	36.4	–6.5
Liberal Democrats	Philip Taylor	165	10.2	–4.9
Majority		277	17.1	N/A
Turnout		1,620	34.6	–10.3
Registered electors		4,695		
Conservative gain from Labour		Swing	▲18.0	

=== Mollington ===
Mollington
Party	Candidate	Votes	%	±%
Conservative	Brian Crowe	512	75.6	–3.6
Liberal Democrats	Joanna Pemberton	105	15.5	+6.6
Labour	Anthony Mills	60	8.9	–3.0
Majority		407	60.1	–7.2
Turnout		677	43.8	+5.2
Registered electors		1,549		
Conservative hold		Swing	▼5.1	

=== Newton St. Michaels ===
Newton St. Michaels
Party	Candidate	Votes	%	±%
Conservative	Marigold Roy	518	42.0	+20.7
Liberal Democrats	Karen Woodcock	396	32.1	–10.0
Labour	John Fetherston	232	18.8	–17.8
Green	Diana Wilderspin-Jones	87	7.1	N/A
Majority		122	9.9	N/A
Turnout		1,233	46.5	–5.9
Registered electors		2,671		
Conservative gain from Liberal Democrats		Swing	▲15.4	

=== Saughall ===
Saughall
Party	Candidate	Votes	%	±%
Conservative	Richard Storrar*	759	67.6	+5.1
Labour	Thomas Andrews	227	20.2	–1.9
Liberal Democrats	John Falconer	136	12.1	–3.3
Majority		532	47.4	+7.1
Turnout		1,122	39.2	–13.8
Registered electors		2,872		
Conservative hold		Swing	▲3.5	

=== Tarvin ===
Tarvin
Party	Candidate	Votes	%	±%
Conservative	Charles Plenderleath*	878	64.3	+4.6
Liberal Democrats	Kevin Hassett	302	22.1	–1.9
Labour	Anthony Pegrum	185	13.6	–2.7
Majority		576	42.2	+6.5
Turnout		1,365	41.4	–14.6
Registered electors		3,305		
Conservative hold		Swing	▲3.3	

=== Tilston ===
Tilston
Party	Candidate	Votes	%	±%
Conservative	Neil Ritchie*	630	84.7	–3.9
Liberal Democrats	Vera Roberts	71	9.5	+1.8
Labour	John Vernon	43	5.8	+2.1
Majority		559	75.1	–5.8
Turnout		744	45.1	+1.1
Registered electors		1,654		
Conservative hold		Swing	▼2.8	

=== Upton Grange ===
Upton Grange
Party	Candidate	Votes	%	±%
Conservative	Jill Houlbrook	1,154	50.4	+14.0
Liberal Democrats	Michael Main	918	40.1	–7.4
Labour	Branda Southward	217	9.5	–6.5
Majority		236	10.3	N/A
Turnout		2,289	45.1	–4.2
Registered electors		5,099		
Conservative gain from Liberal Democrats		Swing	▲10.7	

=== Upton Westlea ===
Upton Westlea
Party	Candidate	Votes	%	±%
Conservative	Caroline Mosley*	667	45.8	–2.1
Labour	James Woodburn	482	33.1	+1.9
Liberal Democrats	David Capstick	202	13.9	–7.0
Green	Malcolm Barker	106	7.3	N/A
Majority		185	12.7	–4.0
Turnout		1,457	48.2	–5.6
Registered electors		3,044		
Conservative hold		Swing	▼2.0	

=== Vicars Cross ===
Vicars Cross
Party	Candidate	Votes	%	±%
Liberal Democrats	Kenneth Holding*	935	47.9	–8.0
Conservative	Peter Dutton	827	42.4	+12.8
Labour	Sara Barnsley	188	9.6	–4.9
Majority		108	5.5	–20.6
Turnout		1,950	43.7	–9.0
Registered electors		4,477		
Liberal Democrats hold		Swing	▼10.4	
