= Claverton, Cheshire =

Former civil parish in Cheshire, England

Coordinates: 53.169°N 2.889°W

Claverton
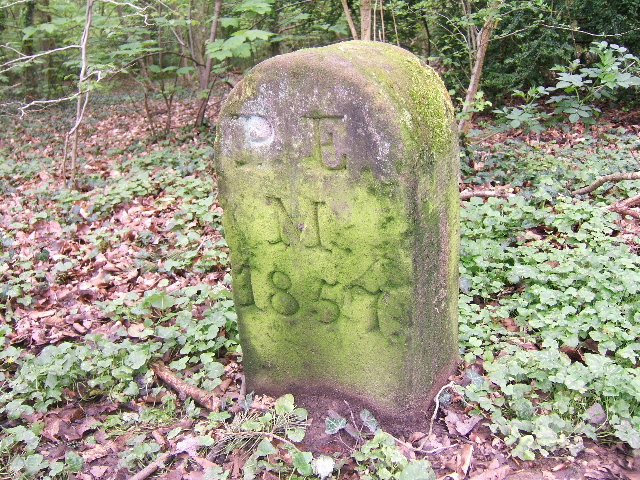
- Boundary stone

- Location within Cheshire
- Population: 7 (2001 census)
- OS grid reference: SJ4063
- Civil parish: Eaton and Eccleston
- Unitary authority: Cheshire West and Chester
- Ceremonial county: Cheshire
- Region: North West
- Country: England
- Sovereign state: United Kingdom
- Post town: CHESTER
- Postcode district: CH4
- Dialling code: 01244
- Police: Cheshire
- Fire: Cheshire
- Ambulance: North West
- UK Parliament: Chester South and Eddisbury

Claverton is a former civil parish, now in the parish of Eaton and Eccleston, in the borough of Cheshire West and Chester and ceremonial county of Cheshire in England. In 2001 it had a population of 7. The parish included the site of The King's School.

In 1086, Claverton was recorded in the Domesday Book as Cleventone. (Note: Possible transcription error: could be Claventone.) The landowner was Hugh FitzOsbern. With a population of 21 households, it was amongst the largest 40% of settlements recorded in the census.

Throughout the nineteenth century the population was recorded as 0. The Imperial Gazetteer of England and Wales described Claverton as "an uninhabited extra-parochial tract in Great Boughton district". In 1858 Claverton became a separate civil parish, on 1 April 2015 the civil parish was abolished to form "Eaton and Eccleston".
