= 1995 Chester City Council election =

1995 English local election

- 4 May 1995

20 out of 60 seats to Chester City Council 31 seats needed for a majority

| | First party | Second party |
|---|---|---|
| Party | Labour | Conservative |
| Last election | 19 seats, 45.1% | 23 seats, 29.2% |
| Seats won | 8 | 6 |
| Seats after | 23 | 19 |
| Seat change | ▲4 | ▼4 |
| Popular vote | 15,176 | 8,984 |
| Percentage | 45.3% | 26.8% |
| Swing | ▲0.2% | ▼2.4% |
| | Third party | Fourth party |
| Party | Liberal Democrats | Independent |
| Last election | 16 seats, 25.0% | 2 seats, 0.0% |
| Seats won | 5 | 1 |
| Seats after | 16 | 2 |
| Seat change | Steady | Steady |
| Popular vote | 7,909 | 1,300 |
| Percentage | 23.6% | 3.9% |
| Swing | ▼1.4% | N/A |
- Winner of each seat at the 1995 Chester City Council election
Council control before election
No overall control
Council control after election
No overall control

The 1995 Chester City Council election took place on 4 May 1995 to elect members of Chester City Council in Cheshire, England. This was on the same day as other local elections.

== Summary ==
=== Election result ===
1995 Chester City Council election
| Party | This election | | | | Full council | | | This election | | |
| Party | Candidates | Seats | Net | Seats % | Other | Total | Total % | Votes | Votes % | +/− |
|---|---|---|---|---|---|---|---|---|---|---|
| Labour | {{{candidates}}} | 8 | ▲4 | 40.0 | 15 | 23 | 38.3 | 15,176 | 45.3 | +0.2 |
| Conservative | {{{candidates}}} | 6 | ▼4 | 30.0 | 13 | 19 | 31.7 | 8,984 | 26.8 | –2.4 |
| Liberal Democrats | {{{candidates}}} | 5 | Steady | 25.0 | 11 | 16 | 26.7 | 7,909 | 23.6 | –1.4 |
| Independent | {{{candidates}}} | 1 | Steady | 5.0 | 1 | 2 | 3.3 | 1,300 | 3.9 | N/A |
| Ratepayer | {{{candidates}}} | 0 | Steady | 0.0 | 0 | 0 | 0.0 | 104 | 0.3 | –0.2 |

== Ward results ==
=== Barrow ===
Barrow
| Party | Candidate | Votes | % | ±% |
|---|---|---|---|---|
| Conservative | B. Roberts | 696 | 45.5 | –9.0 |
| Labour | R. Barlow | 567 | 37.1 | –8.4 |
| Liberal Democrats | U. Gerstl | 266 | 17.4 | N/A |
| Majority | | 129 | 8.4 | –0.7 |
| Turnout | | 1,529 | 39.3 | –1.7 |
| Registered electors | | 3,887 | | |
| Conservative hold | | Swing | ▼0.3 | |

=== Blacon Hall ===
Blacon Hall
| Party | Candidate | Votes | % | ±% |
|---|---|---|---|---|
| Labour | L. Price* | 1,118 | 89.1 | –3.4 |
| Conservative | E. Margerum | 89 | 7.1 | –0.4 |
| Liberal Democrats | H. Prydderch | 48 | 3.8 | N/A |
| Majority | | 1,029 | 82.0 | –3.0 |
| Turnout | | 1,255 | 30.6 | –0.4 |
| Registered electors | | 4,102 | | |
| Labour hold | | Swing | ▼1.5 | |

=== Boughton Heath ===
Boughton Heath
| Party | Candidate | Votes | % | ±% |
|---|---|---|---|---|
| Liberal Democrats | A. Farrell* | 1,087 | 52.2 | –0.8 |
| Labour | E. Davies | 512 | 24.6 | +5.5 |
| Conservative | P. Gaskin | 484 | 23.2 | –4.6 |
| Majority | | 575 | 27.6 | +2.4 |
| Turnout | | 2,083 | 46.0 | –5.0 |
| Registered electors | | 4,524 | | |
| Liberal Democrats hold | | Swing | ▼3.2 | |

=== Christleton ===
Christleton
| Party | Candidate | Votes | % | ±% |
|---|---|---|---|---|
| Conservative | J. Boughton | 846 | 47.3 | –13.6 |
| Labour | S. Wardman | 588 | 32.9 | +12.9 |
| Liberal Democrats | I. Mottershaw | 354 | 19.8 | +0.7 |
| Majority | | 258 | 14.4 | –27.8 |
| Turnout | | 1,768 | 46.0 | –0.4 |
| Registered electors | | 3,888 | | |
| Conservative hold | | Swing | ▼13.3 | |

=== College ===
College
| Party | Candidate | Votes | % | ±% |
|---|---|---|---|---|
| Labour | E. Degg | 1,203 | 67.5 | –0.6 |
| Conservative | S. Barclay | 342 | 19.2 | –3.8 |
| Liberal Democrats | J. Indermaur | 132 | 7.4 | N/A |
| Ratepayer | D. Taylor | 104 | 5.8 | –3.1 |
| Majority | | 861 | 48.3 | +3.1 |
| Turnout | | 1,781 | 37.6 | +1.6 |
| Registered electors | | 4,738 | | |
| Labour hold | | Swing | ▲1.6 | |

=== Dee Point ===
Dee Point
| Party | Candidate | Votes | % | ±% |
|---|---|---|---|---|
| Labour | M. Nelson* | 1,098 | 83.2 | –2.5 |
| Conservative | J. Jaworzyn | 150 | 11.4 | –2.9 |
| Liberal Democrats | L. Biddle | 71 | 5.4 | N/A |
| Majority | | 948 | 71.9 | +0.4 |
| Turnout | | 1,319 | 30.0 | –1.0 |
| Registered electors | | 4,393 | | |
| Labour hold | | Swing | ▲0.2 | |

=== Dodleston ===
Dodleston
| Party | Candidate | Votes | % | ±% |
|---|---|---|---|---|
| Conservative | W. Fair* | 421 | 51.0 | –17.7 |
| Labour | A. Porter | 323 | 39.2 | +21.1 |
| Liberal Democrats | K. Prydderch | 81 | 9.8 | –3.4 |
| Majority | | 98 | 11.9 | –38.8 |
| Turnout | | 825 | 49.0 | –5.4 |
| Registered electors | | 1,684 | | |
| Conservative hold | | Swing | ▼19.4 | |

=== Elton ===
Elton
| Party | Candidate | Votes | % | ±% |
|---|---|---|---|---|
| Labour | D. Bennett | 1,023 | 53.6 | –5.5 |
| Conservative | D. Rowlands* | 726 | 38.1 | –2.8 |
| Liberal Democrats | G. Ralph | 158 | 8.3 | N/A |
| Majority | | 297 | 15.6 | –2.5 |
| Turnout | | 1,907 | 39.0 | –6.0 |
| Registered electors | | 4,870 | | |
| Labour gain from Conservative | | Swing | ▼1.4 | |

=== Grosvenor ===
Grosvenor
| Party | Candidate | Votes | % | ±% |
|---|---|---|---|---|
| Labour | R. Davidson | 1,117 | 49.3 | –8.1 |
| Conservative | C. White | 781 | 34.5 | –8.1 |
| Liberal Democrats | T. Crossland | 368 | 16.2 | N/A |
| Majority | | 336 | 14.8 | –0.1 |
| Turnout | | 2,266 | 52.0 | ±0.0 |
| Registered electors | | 4,344 | | |
| Labour gain from Conservative | | Swing | 0.0 | |

=== Hoole ===
Hoole
| Party | Candidate | Votes | % | ±% |
|---|---|---|---|---|
| Liberal Democrats | J. Smith* | 1,202 | 53.0 | –4.1 |
| Labour | D. Kelly | 1,064 | 47.0 | +11.4 |
| Majority | | 138 | 6.1 | –15.5 |
| Turnout | | 2,266 | 47.9 | –1.1 |
| Registered electors | | 4,726 | | |
| Liberal Democrats hold | | Swing | ▼7.8 | |

=== Malpas ===
Malpas
| Party | Candidate | Votes | % | ±% |
|---|---|---|---|---|
| Conservative | L. Crump* | 685 | 62.7 | +13.7 |
| Labour | S. Davies | 298 | 27.3 | N/A |
| Liberal Democrats | N. Banks | 110 | 10.1 | N/A |
| Majority | | 387 | 35.4 | N/A |
| Turnout | | 1,093 | 35.8 | –4.4 |
| Registered electors | | 3,051 | | |
| Conservative hold | | | | |

=== Newton ===
Newton
| Party | Candidate | Votes | % | ±% |
|---|---|---|---|---|
| Liberal Democrats | D. Simpson* | 795 | 43.4 | –9.2 |
| Labour | W. Megarrell | 521 | 28.5 | +8.9 |
| Conservative | J. Smith | 515 | 28.1 | +0.3 |
| Majority | | 274 | 15.0 | –9.8 |
| Turnout | | 1,831 | 45.7 | –6.3 |
| Registered electors | | 4,007 | | |
| Liberal Democrats hold | | Swing | ▼9.1 | |

=== Plas Newton ===
Plas Newton
| Party | Candidate | Votes | % | ±% |
|---|---|---|---|---|
| Liberal Democrats | R. Hale* | 921 | 56.0 | –3.3 |
| Labour | G. Criag | 723 | 44.0 | +15.7 |
| Majority | | 198 | 12.0 | –19.0 |
| Turnout | | 1,644 | 45.2 | –6.8 |
| Registered electors | | 3,637 | | |
| Liberal Democrats hold | | Swing | ▼9.5 | |

=== Saughall ===
Saughall
| Party | Candidate | Votes | % | ±% |
|---|---|---|---|---|
| Conservative | R. Storrar | 609 | 38.9 | –9.6 |
| Liberal Democrats | J. Pemberton | 479 | 30.6 | –10.6 |
| Labour | C. Gahan | 477 | 30.5 | +20.2 |
| Majority | | 130 | 8.3 | +1.1 |
| Turnout | | 1,565 | 52.2 | +3.2 |
| Registered electors | | 2,998 | | |
| Conservative hold | | Swing | ▲0.5 | |

=== Sealand ===
Sealand
| Party | Candidate | Votes | % | ±% |
|---|---|---|---|---|
| Labour | D. Nield | 1,180 | 80.7 | +23.3 |
| Conservative | C. Pearson | 150 | 10.3 | –14.0 |
| Liberal Democrats | R. Price | 133 | 9.1 | –9.2 |
| Majority | | 1,030 | 70.4 | +37.3 |
| Turnout | | 1,463 | 37.0 | –5.0 |
| Registered electors | | 3,953 | | |
| Labour hold | | Swing | ▲18.7 | |

=== Tarvin ===
Tarvin
| Party | Candidate | Votes | % | ±% |
|---|---|---|---|---|
| Conservative | C. Plenderleath* | 605 | 53.5 | –19.9 |
| Labour | A. Pegrum | 434 | 38.4 | +11.8 |
| Liberal Democrats | S. Plank | 92 | 8.1 | N/A |
| Majority | | 171 | 15.1 | –31.8 |
| Turnout | | 1,131 | 33.7 | –11.5 |
| Registered electors | | 3,355 | | |
| Conservative hold | | Swing | ▼15.9 | |

=== Tattenhall ===
Tattenhall
| Party | Candidate | Votes | % | ±% |
|---|---|---|---|---|
| Independent | J. Haynes* | 723 | 65.9 | N/A |
| Conservative | I. Cross | 219 | 20.0 | –25.6 |
| Liberal Democrats | M. Richardson | 155 | 14.1 | +0.9 |
| Majority | | 504 | 45.9 | N/A |
| Turnout | | 1,097 | 42.0 | –2.0 |
| Registered electors | | 2,614 | | |
| Independent hold | | | | |

=== Upton Heath ===
Upton Heath
| Party | Candidate | Votes | % | ±% |
|---|---|---|---|---|
| Labour | N. Dixon | 1,065 | 48.5 | +1.9 |
| Conservative | J. Cliffe* | 663 | 30.2 | +2.0 |
| Liberal Democrats | R. Biddle | 385 | 17.5 | –7.7 |
| Independent | J. Starkey | 81 | 3.7 | N/A |
| Majority | | 402 | 18.3 | –0.1 |
| Turnout | | 2,194 | 54.0 | –3.0 |
| Registered electors | | 4,043 | | |
| Labour gain from Conservative | | Swing | ▼0.1 | |

=== Vicars Cross ===
Vicars Cross
| Party | Candidate | Votes | % | ±% |
|---|---|---|---|---|
| Liberal Democrats | S. Proctor* | 1,072 | 55.0 | –6.3 |
| Labour | C. Jones | 543 | 27.9 | +7.6 |
| Conservative | D. Gauke | 333 | 17.1 | –1.4 |
| Majority | | 529 | 27.2 | –13.8 |
| Turnout | | 1,948 | 44.3 | –1.7 |
| Registered electors | | 4,395 | | |
| Liberal Democrats hold | | Swing | ▼7.0 | |

=== Westminster ===
Westminster
| Party | Candidate | Votes | % | ±% |
|---|---|---|---|---|
| Labour | S. Murphy | 1,322 | 53.1 | +4.7 |
| Conservative | D. Bithell | 670 | 26.9 | –9.0 |
| Independent | R. Croft* | 496 | 19.9 | N/A |
| Majority | | 652 | 26.2 | +13.7 |
| Turnout | | 2,488 | 48.3 | –3.7 |
| Registered electors | | 5,150 | | |
| Labour gain from Conservative | | Swing | ▲6.9 | |
