= Tarvin Rural District =

Former local government area in the UK

Coordinates: 53.195°N 2.767°W

Tarvin
- Tarvin RD within Cheshire in 1970
- Area
  - 1911: 56,874 acres (230.16 km^{2})
  - 1931: 56,871 acres (230.15 km^{2})
  - 1961: 62,593 acres (253.30 km^{2})
- Population
  - 1901: 12,614
  - 1931: 13,279
  - 1971: 18,152
- History
  - Origin: Sanitary district
  - Created: 1894
  - Abolished: 1974
  - Succeeded by: Chester
- Status: Rural district
- Government: Tarvin Rural District Council
  - HQ: Tarvin House, Tower Wharf, Chester
- Subdivisions
  - Type: Civil parishes

Tarvin was, from 1894 to 1974, a rural district in the administrative county of Cheshire, England. The district was named after the village of Tarvin, and saw considerable boundary changes throughout its life.

== Creation ==
The district was created by the Local Government Act 1894 as the successor to Tarvin Rural Sanitary District. It initially consisted of the following civil parishes:

- Aldersley
- Aldford
- Ashton
- Barrow
- Barton
- Beeston
- Broxton
- Buerton
- Bruen Stapleford
- Burton by Tarvin
- Burwardsley
- Caldecott
- Carden
- Chowley
- Church Shocklach
- Churton by Aldford
- Churton by Farndon
- Churton Heath
- Clotton Hoofield
- Clutton
- Coddington
- Cotton Abbotts
- Crewe
- Duddon
- Edgerley
- Farndon
- Foulk Stapleford
- Golborne Bellow
- Golborne David
- Lower Kinnerton
- Grafton
- Guilden Sutton
- Handley
- Harthill
- Hatton
- Hockenhull
- Horton
- Horton cum Peel
- Huntington
- Huxley
- Iddinshall
- Kelsall
- Kings Marsh
- Lea Newbold
- Mouldsworth
- Newton by Tattenhall
- Prior's Heys
- Rowton
- Saighton
- Shocklach Oviatt
- Stretton
- Tarvin
- Tattenhall
- Tilston
- Tilstone Fearnall
- Tiverton
- Waverton
- Willington

== 1936 boundary changes ==
In 1936 the boundaries of the rural district were substantially altered under a county review order. It lost large parts to Chester Rural District, but also absorbed most of the disbanded Malpas Rural District.

- 10,746 acres (43.49 km^{2}) (Aldford, Barrow, Buerton, Churton by Aldford, Churton Heath, Guilden Sutton, Huntington, Lea Newbold, Rowton, and Saighton) passed to Chester RD
- 233 acres (0.94 km^{2}) to Nantwich Rural District
- 11 acres (0.045 km^{2}) to Hoole Urban District
- 16,712 acres (67.63 km^{2}) were received from Malpas RD.

The following parishes were added to the district:

- Agden
- Bickley
- Bradley
- Chidlow
- Chorlton
- Cuddington
- Duckington
- Edge
- Hampton
- Larkton
- Macefen
- Malpas
- Newton by Malpas
- Oldcastle
- Overton
- Stockton
- Threapwood
- Tushingham cum Grindley
- Wigland
- Wychough

== Abolition ==
The Local Government Act 1972 completely reorganised council boundaries throughout England and Wales. On 1 April 1974 Tarvin Rural District was merged with the city and county borough of Chester and the Chester Rural District to form the new non-metropolitan district of Chester.
