= Malpas Rural District =

Former local government area in the UK

Coordinates: 53.019°N 2.764°W

Malpas
- Area
  - 1911: 21,406 acres (86.63 km^{2})
  - 1931: 21,405 acres (86.62 km^{2})
- Population
  - 1901: 4,488
  - 1931: 4,283
- History
  - Origin: Sanitary district
  - Created: 1894
  - Abolished: 1936
  - Succeeded by: Nantwich Rural District, Tarvin Rural District
- Status: Rural district
- Government: Malpas Rural District Council
  - HQ: Malpas
- Subdivisions
  - Type: Civil parishes

Malpas was, from 1894 to 1936, a rural district in the administrative county of Cheshire, England. The district was named after the village of Malpas.

== Creation ==
The district was created by the Local Government Act 1894 by the division of the existing Whitchurch Rural Sanitary District The Cheshire parishes in the sanitary district became Malpas Rural District, while the remaining area in Shropshire became Whitchurch Rural District. It consisted of the following civil parishes:

- Agden
- Bickley
- Bradley
- Chidlow
- Chorlton
- Cuddington
- Duckington
- Edge
- Hampton
- Larkton
- Macefen
- Malpas
- Marbury cum Quoisley
- Newton by Malpas
- Norbury
- Oldcastle
- Overton
- Stockton
- Threapwood
- Tushingham cum Grindley
- Wigland
- Wirswall
- Wychough

== Abolition ==
The district was abolished in 1936 under a county review order. Its area was divided between two neighbouring rural districts. The greater part passed to Tarvin Rural District and the remainder (Marbury cum Quoisley, Norbury and Wirswall parishes) going to Nantwich Rural District.
