= Listed buildings in Bradley, Cheshire =

Bradley is a former civil parish, now in the parishes of Tushingham-cum-Grindley, Macefen and Bradley and Malpas in Cheshire West and Chester, England. It contains five buildings that are recorded in the National Heritage List for England as designated listed buildings, all of which are at Grade II. This grade is the lowest of the three gradings given to listed buildings and is applied to "buildings of national importance and special interest". The parish is entirely rural, and the listed buildings consist of two farmhouses and a farm building, (all dating from the 17th century and basically timber-framed) and two guideposts from the 19th century.

Name and location	Photograph	Date	Notes
Yew Tree Farmhouse; 53.0044°N 2.7161°W		Early 17th century	A timber-framed farmhouse with brick nogging, standing on a brick plinth, with a slate roof. The left gable has been replaced in brick. The farmhouse is in two storeys, and the windows are casements. The chimney has three separate flues. Inside the farmhouse are back-to-back inglenooks.
Shippon, Top Farm; 53.0138°N 2.7317°W	—	Mid-17th century (probable)	The shippon is timber-framed, partly replaced in brick, with an 18th-century brick extension. The original part has a corrugated iron roof; that of the extension is in slate. The hayloft is weatherboarded.
Top Farmhouse; 53.0139°N 2.7314°W	—	Mid-17th century (probable)	The farmhouse was extended in the early 18th century. It is basically timber-framed, and almost completely pebbledashed, with the end walls replaced in brick. The farmhouse is in two storeys, with a slate roof. The windows are 19th-century casements. Inside is an inglenook.
Guidepost, Chapel Lane; 53.00635°N 2.73840°W		1870s (probable)	The guidepost consists of a cast iron shaft bearing a shield with the embossed letters "CCC", surmounted by a ball finial. Plates indicate the directions to Malpas, Macefen, and Whitchurch.
Guidepost, Dodd's Lane; 53.00185°N 2.73531°W	—	1870s (probable)	The guidepost consists of a cast iron shaft bearing a shield with the embossed letters "CCC", surmounted by a ball finial. Plates indicate the directions to Malpas, Dodd's Lane, and Whitchurch.

== See also ==
- Listed buildings in Wirswall
- Listed buildings in Marbury cum Quoisley
- Listed buildings in Malpas
- Listed buildings in Tushingham cum Grindley
- Listed buildings in Wigland
- Listed buildings in Chidlow
