= Tushingham-cum-Grindley, Macefen and Bradley =

Civil parish in Cheshire, England

Coordinates: 53°00′17″N 2°42′50″W

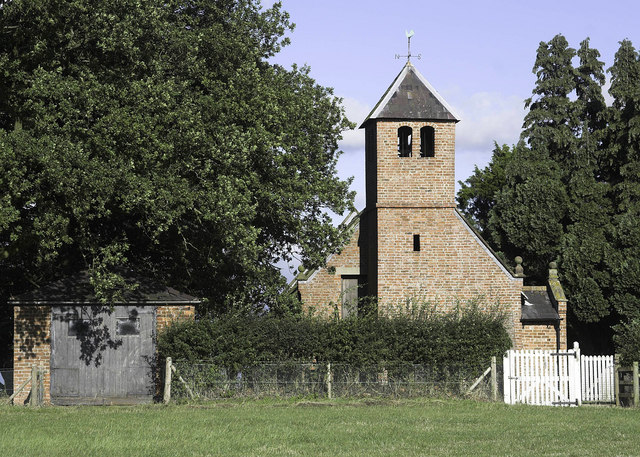
- St Chad's Church, Tushingham

- Location within Cheshire
- Civil parish: Tushingham-cum-Grindley, Macefen and Bradley
- Unitary authority: Cheshire West and Chester
- Ceremonial county: Cheshire
- Region: North West
- Country: England
- Sovereign state: United Kingdom

Tushingham-cum-Grindley, Macefen and Bradley is a civil parish in the unitary authority of Cheshire West and Chester and the ceremonial county of Cheshire, England. It was created in 2015, under the terms of the Local Government and Public Involvement in Health Act 2007, from the civil parish of Tushingham cum Grindley with parts of the historic civil parishes of Macefen and Bradley.

As part of the boundary reorganisation, a small area in the north of Macefen was incorporated in the civil parish of No Man's Heath and District, and a small area to the west of Bradley, forming a near-exclave between Malpas, Wychough and Chidlow, was transferred to Malpas.

The area of the parish is largely farmland, but includes the scattered settlements of Tushingham, Bell o' th' Hill and Bradley Green.
