= Whitewell, Wrexham =

Rural settlement in Wales

Coordinates: 52.967°N 2.753°W

Whitewell
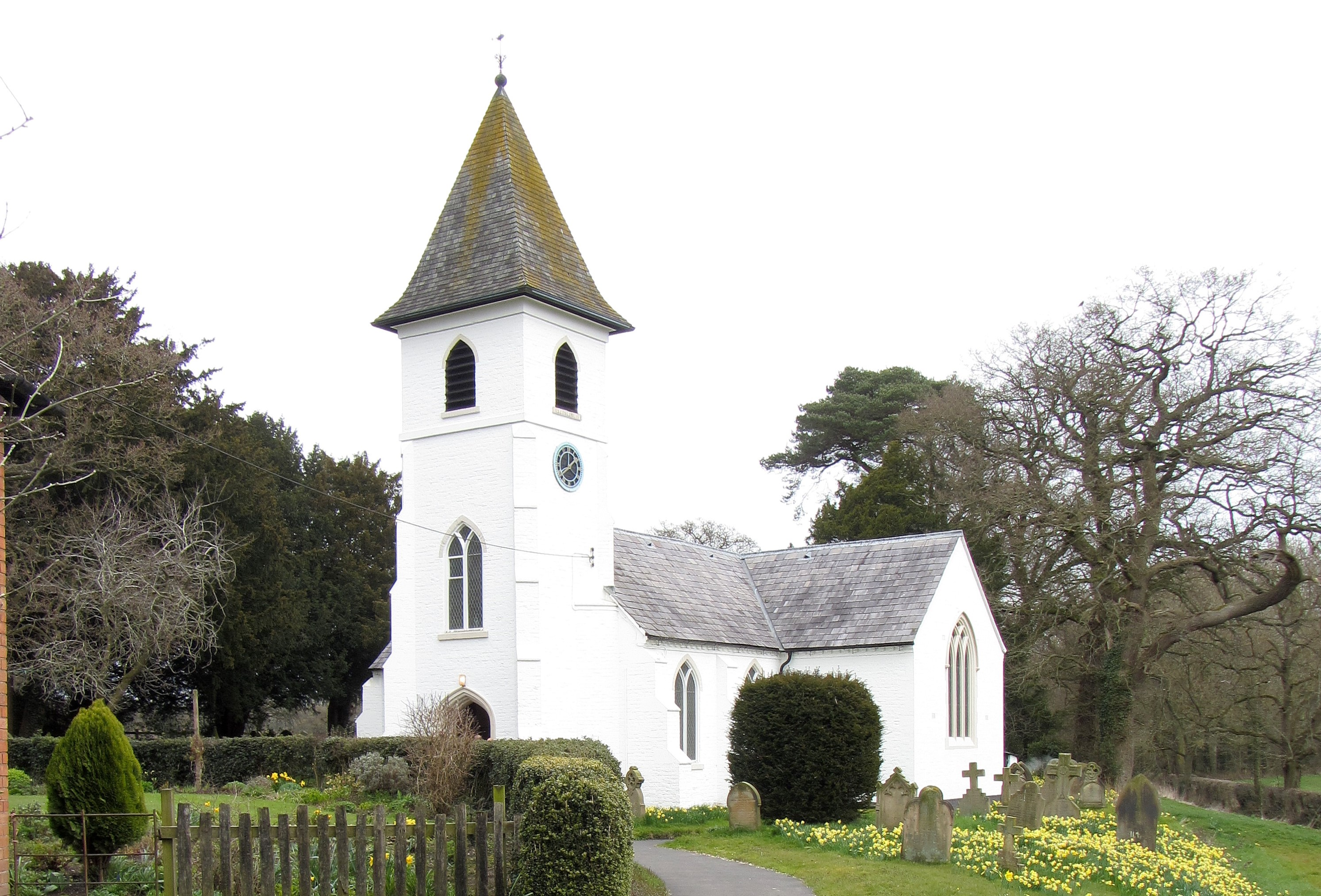
- St Mary's church, Whitewell

- Location within Wrexham
- OS grid reference: SJ4949641397
- Community: Bronington
- Principal area: Wrexham
- Preserved county: Clwyd
- Country: Wales
- Sovereign state: United Kingdom
- Post town: WHITCHURCH
- Postcode district: SY13
- Dialling code: 01948
- Police: North Wales
- Fire: North Wales
- Ambulance: Welsh
- UK Parliament: Clwyd South
- Senedd Cymru – Welsh Parliament: Clwyd South

Whitewell (Welsh pronunciation) is a dispersed rural settlement, and surrounding ecclesiastical parish, in the community of Bronington, in the east of Wrexham County Borough, Wales.

The Welsh language name of the parish, and of the area's former civil parish, is Iscoed, historically spelled as Iscoyd. The name can be translated as "below wood" or "underwood". The settlement itself is recommended to also use "Whitewell" in Welsh.

== History ==
Recorded as early as 1570, the chapel at Whitewell was originally a chapel of ease to Malpas in Cheshire, although geographically it lay in the detached portion of Flintshire known as the Maelor Saesneg. A 1657 visitation referred to it as the "Chappell of Whitewell" and suggested it be made a separate parish church, given its distance from Malpas and two fords across the "river of Elfe [and] another dangerous brooke". At this time the township of Malpas parish in which the chapel lay was usually known as Iscoyd.

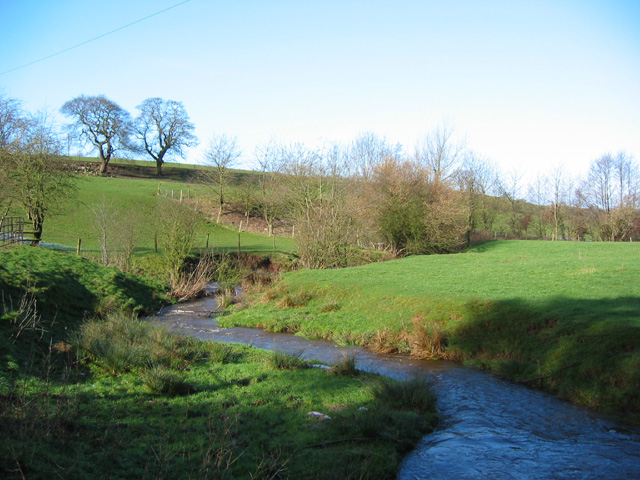
The Iscoyd Brook, near Whitewell. It flows into the Wych Brook (formerly the River Elfe), which forms the northern parish boundary.

Whitewell was finally made a parish in its own right in 1885, at which time its parishioners elected to stay part of the Diocese of Chester. The boundaries of the new parish of Whitewell were identical to those of Iscoyd township. While the parish remained part of the Church of England, for civil administration purposes the area (known as the civil parish of Iscoyd) remained in Wales as part of the Maelor Rural District of Flintshire, although an 1887 Boundary Commission review found that a majority of the local population favoured becoming part of Shropshire. In 1974, under the terms of the Local Government Act 1972, it was merged into the community of Bronington as part of the new county of Clwyd. It subsequently became part of Wrexham County Borough.

There were once two saline springs at the hamlet of Lower Wych in the parish, with a further three springs nearby at Higher Wych on the English side of the border. These natural springs or 'brine pits' were used to extract water for salt production by evaporation in 'wych-houses'. Salt was recorded as being produced here from the 14th century up until as late as 1845. One brine pit, measuring about 7 metres across, shown on early Ordnance Survey maps as a 'salt spring', still exists on the southern bank of the Wych Brook at Lower Wych immediately after the Shothill Brook joins it.

The presence of the salt springs has led to Iscoyd township, along with neighbouring township of Tybroughton, being identified with the lost Domesday Book manor of Burwardeston, which was described as containing a salt house.

== St Mary’s church ==
The isolated parish church is situated in a rectilinear churchyard alongside the Iscoyd Brook. It is a whitewashed brick building constructed in 1830, with a spire and clock added in 1898. It replaced an earlier thatched, timber-framed building that collapsed in 1829 during an attempt to restore it. The church contains some panelling reused from the earlier building, as well as a 1696 monument to the clergyman and diarist Philip Henry, who lived nearby, and a memorial dated 1782 to local landowner Richard Congreve, who was the first burial in the church grounds.

The rector between 1885 and 1926 was the Rev. Joseph Jacob, an amateur botanist and author. Jacob, an editor of the Royal Horticultural Society Daffodil Yearbook, was responsible for the large-scale planting of daffodils which still grow in the churchyard, and developed cultivars of daffodil, crocus and Lachenalia named after Whitewell.

The White Well, the well or spring from which the settlement takes its name, possibly a holy well associated with the church site, is located south of the churchyard. Writing in 1876, the Vicar of Hanmer Canon M.H. Lee noted that the Domesday Book recorded many church land holdings in the area, suggested a link with the monastery at Bangor-on-Dee and speculated that the pre-1829 chapel had been Anglo-Saxon in origin. While there is some indication of a place of worship being on the site from very early times, and it has been suggested that the well marks the site of the original chapel, the current assessment of the Clwyd-Powys Archaeological Trust is that there is no firm evidence that the well has special religious significance. A second well is located some 40 metres south-west of the White Well.

== Historic buildings ==
Although most buildings within Whitewell itself are of 19th century origin, there is a grade II listed thatched carriage shelter, probably dating from the 17th or 18th century, close to the church. Also within the parish is the mansion of Iscoyd Park, a grade II* listed 18th century house. There is a listed war memorial near to Iscoyd Park.

Whitewell Parish Hall is grade II listed and along with the rectory is in the style of John Douglas, although not previously attributed to him.
