= Listed buildings in Edge, Cheshire =

Edge is a former civil parish, now in the parishes of No Man's Heath and District and Malpas, in Cheshire West and Chester, England. It contains 18 buildings that are recorded in the National Heritage List for England as designated listed buildings. One of these is listed at Grade II*, the middle grade, and the rest at the lowest grade, Grade II. The parish is entirely rural, and most of the listed buildings are domestic, or related to farming. The most important building is the country house, Edge Hall, which dates from about 1600. Many of the other listed buildings are houses and cottages, either timber-framed or with a timber-framed core, dating from the 17th century. Other structures in the list include a former corn mill, former stables, and a bridge near Edge Hall.

== Key ==
Grade	Criteria
II*	Particularly important buildings of more than special interest
II	Buildings of national importance and special interest

== Buildings ==
Name and location	Photograph	Date	Notes	Grade
Edge Hall; 53.0475°N 2.7758°W	—	c. 1600	A country house with a timber framed core, standing on a moated site, it was encased in brick in about 1700. The front dates mainly from 1721, and there have been later alterations and additions. It has two storeys, and is in six bays, with two gables to the left of the entrance, and three to the right. The entrance is recessed, and has a brick parapet with stone balusters. Above the entrance is an octagonal open cupola with a hemispherical roof and a ball finial. The doorcase has Corinthian pilasters supporting an open pediment. On the rear are bow windows. Inside, the hall contains an Ionic screen, and in the dining room is an elaborate chimneypiece.	II*
Gameswood Cottage; 53.03707°N 2.78018°W		Early 17th century	Additions were made later to the rear of the cottage, which is timber-framed with brick nogging. The roof is slated with a tiled ridge. The cottage has 1½ storeys, and the windows are casements.	II
Park Cottages; 53.04912°N 2.78628°W		Early 17th century	A pair of cottages to which additions were made later in the 17th century. They are timber-framed with brick nogging, which is partly limewashed, on a stone plinth. The roofs are slated with a tiled ridge. The cottages are in 1½ storeys, with a central dormer.	II
Dyers Farmhouse; 53.04569°N 2.78955°W		Early to mid-17th century	Additions and alterations were made to the farmhouse in the 19th century. It is timber-framed with limewashed brick nogging on a stone plinth. The roof is slated with a tiled ridge. The house is in 1½ storeys. It has a central dormer, and casement windows. Inside the farmhouse is an inglenook.	II
Brassey's Contract Cottage; 53.04841°N 2.76756°W		Mid-17th century	The cottage has later additions and alterations. It is timber-framed with brick nogging, some of which is painted. Part of the cottage is on a stone plinth. The roof is thatched, and covered in corrugated iron. The cottage has 1½ storeys, and the windows are casements.	II
Dairy Range, Dairy House Farm; 53.04702°N 2.77503°W	—	17th century	Most of the building dates from 1721, with a 19th-century addition in the same style. It is in brick with stone dressings and slate roofs, and has an L-shaped plan. The former stables have 2½ storeys, and are in three gabled bays. To the rear is a single-storey dairy house, which is timber-framed with brick nogging. The former barn has two gables.	II
Hannett's Cottage; 53.03287°N 2.77564°W	—	17th century	This originated as two cottages that were later combined, with alterations in the 19th and 20th centuries. It is partly timber-framed with brick nogging, and partly in brick. The roof is slated. The building is in one storey, and has a five-bay front. Each former cottage has a dormer. Inside is a massive stone fireplace, a brick oven, and a wooden spiral staircase.	II
Kidnall Cottage; 53.03763°N 2.78073°W		Late 17th century	The cottage has a timber-framed core. Apart from the right gable, which is brick nogged, it has been encased in limewashed brick. The cottage has a slate roof, with a tiled ridge. It is in two storeys, and its windows are casements.	II
Mole End; 53.03515°N 2.77082°W	—	Late 17th century	A much-restored timber-framed cottage with stuccoed panels, and a brick wing to the rear. The roof is slated, with a tiled ridge. The cottage has two storeys, and all the windows are casements.	II
Noonday Cottage; 53.05243°N 2.76800°W	—	Late 17th century	The cottage was altered in the 19th century, with additions to the rear and the sides. It is timber-framed with brick nogging, and has a tiled roof. There are 1½ storeys, with dormers in the upper floor. The windows are casements.	II
The Bank; 53.04815°N 2.76637°W	—	Late 17th century	A timber-framed cottage with brick nogging, some of it painted to resemble timber framing. It stands partly on a brick plinth, and has a slate roof with a tiled ridge. The cottage was originally in one storey, and was later raised in brick to 1½ storeys. The windows are casements, with dormers in the upper floor.	II
The Bryans; 53.04925°N 2.77095°W	—	Late 17th century	A cottage with later additions and alterations. It is timber-framed with brick nogging, and has a tiled roof. The cottage has 1½ storeys, and three dormers. The windows are casements.	II
The Round House; 53.04508°N 2.75026°W	—	Mid-18th century	Most of the farmhouse dates from the 19th century. It is constructed in brick with a tiled roof. The house has two storeys with attics and cellars. There is a French window with sandstone steps leading down to the garden. The other windows are casements. The sides of the house are tile-hung, and each has two dormers.	II
Lowcross Mill; 53.04766°N 2.79124°W		1769 or earlier	A former water-powered corn mill. It is constructed in sandstone and brick, with some cast iron. Some mill machinery has survived, including a high-breast waterwheel.	II
Gatehouse Farmhouse; 53.03878°N 2.77706°W	—	Late 18th or early 19th century	The farmhouse is in painted brick, and has a slate roof with a tiled ridge. It is in two storeys, and has a rear wing. The windows are casements, and there is a timber porch with a finial. On the right gable is a dentillated decoration giving the appearance of an open pediment.	II
Bridge, Edge Hall; 53.04786°N 2.77589°W	—	Early 19th century	A sandstone bridge over the former moat. It is in stone, consists of single arch, and has a parapet with stone coping.	II
The Clock House; 53.0442°N 2.7556°W	—	Early 19th century	This originated as a carriage house, stables, and accommodation for the ostler. It is built in brick with a hipped slate roof and a tiled ridge. The building has a three-bay block with an additional bay on each side. In the centre is a pedimented gable with a stone cornice that contains a clock face, above which is a cupola. The building has carriage doors, and windows inserted in the former hay loft.	II
Higher Hall Farmhouse; 53.0482°N 2.7585°W	—	c. 1845	A farmhouse on the site of an earlier house, it is constructed in brick with stone dressings on a stone plinth. It has a hipped slate roof with a tiled ridge. The house is in two storeys, and has a rectangular plan with an added wing to the rear. On the front is a central timber porch and a single-storey bay window. There are three doorways, each with a fanlight. The windows are a mix of sashes and casements.	II

== See also ==
- Listed buildings in Bickerton
- Listed buildings in Bradley
- Listed buildings in Cholmondeley
- Listed buildings in Duckington
- Listed buildings in Egerton
- Listed buildings in Malpas
- Listed buildings in Marbury cum Quoisley
- Listed buildings in Norbury
- Listed buildings in Tilston
- Listed buildings in Tushingham cum Grindley
