= Bradley Green, Cheshire =

Hamlet in Cheshire, England

Coordinates: 53°00′18″N 2°44′10″W

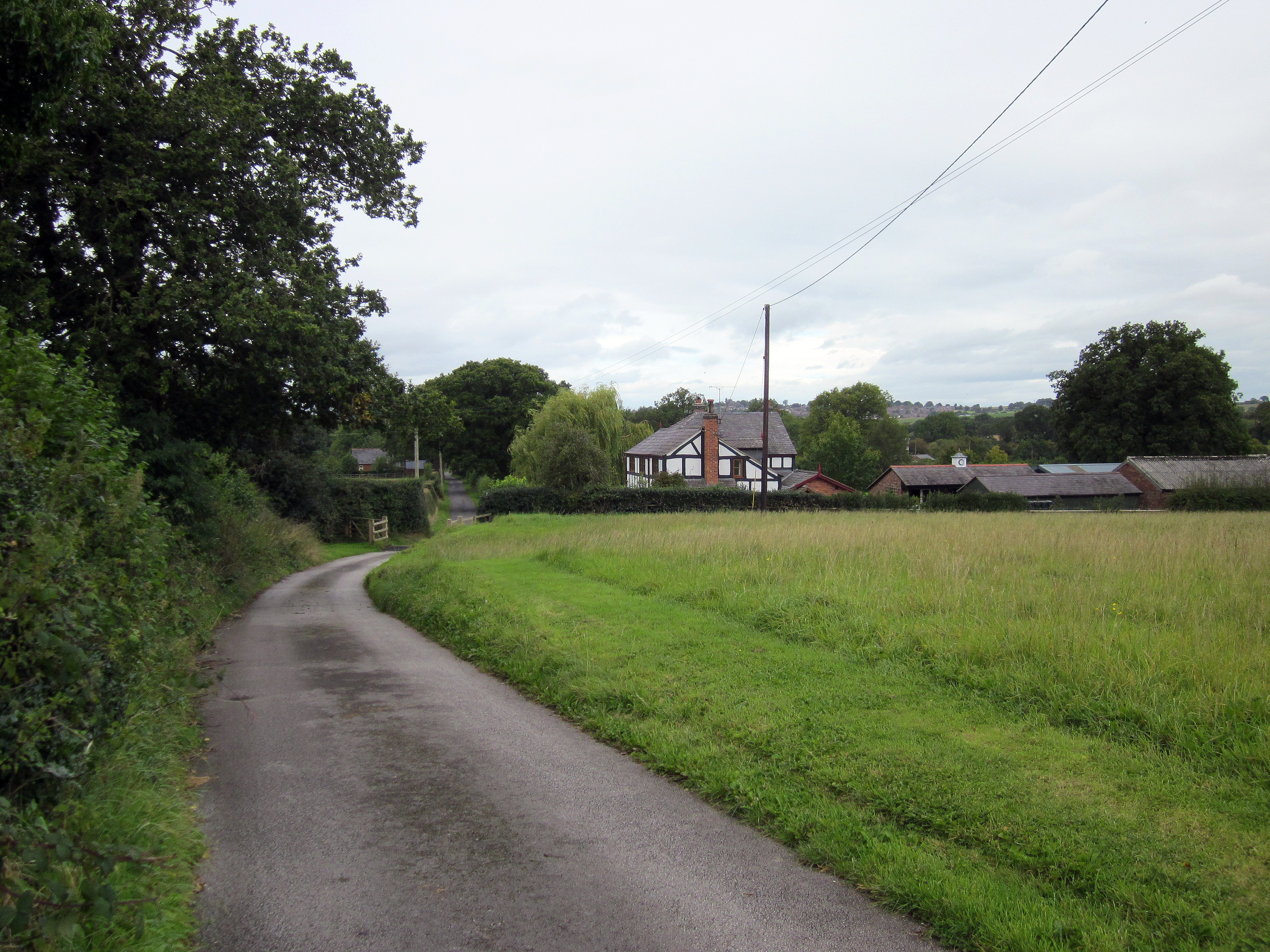
Footpath in Bradley Green

Bradley Green is a hamlet in Cheshire West and Chester, England. It lies about 1 1/2 miles (2.4 km) southeast of the town of Malpas and falls within the civil parish of Tushingham-cum-Grindley, Macefen and Bradley.

In 2015, the ancient parish of Bradley, of which Bradley Green was the chief settlement, was abolished to form part of the current parish.

Nearby at grid reference SJ507456 is a deserted medieval village. The site, which aerial photography has shown to have small house platforms and a former road, is a Scheduled Ancient Monument.

== See also ==
- Listed buildings in Bradley, Cheshire
