= Tushingham cum Grindley =

Former civil parish in Cheshire, England

Coordinates: 53.011640°N 2.705687°W

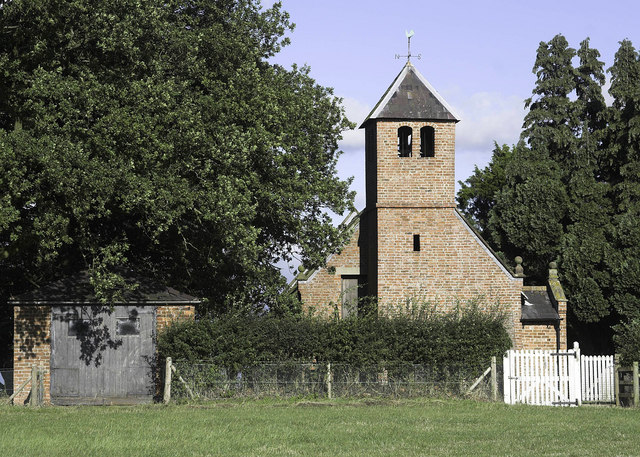
- St. Chad's Church, Tushingham

- Location within Cheshire
- Population: 187 (2011)
- OS grid reference: SJ527462
- Civil parish: Tushingham-cum-Grindley, Macefen and Bradley
- Unitary authority: Cheshire West and Chester
- Ceremonial county: Cheshire
- Region: North West
- Country: England
- Sovereign state: United Kingdom
- Post town: WHITCHURCH
- Postcode district: SY13
- Dialling code: 01948
- Police: Cheshire
- Fire: Cheshire
- Ambulance: North West
- UK Parliament: Chester South and Eddisbury

Tushingham cum Grindley is a former civil parish, now in the parish of Tushingham-cum-Grindley, Macefen and Bradley, in the unitary authority of Cheshire West and Chester and the ceremonial county of Cheshire, England. The parish contained the village of Tushingham and the hamlet of Bell o' th' Hill. According to the 2001 UK census, the total population of the civil parish was 166, rising to 187 at the 2011 Census.

== Etymology ==
The Grindley component of the name has been given as Grenleg' Grenlet, Grenlee, Grynleye, Grynesley, and Gryndley sometimes with Broke, broc, or "le Brock" added to the end since the thirteenth century. It refers to "Green wood" or "clearing" next to a brook. The brook later became known as Wych Brook, and it now forms the county boundary between Cheshire and Shropshire at that point.

For the origins of Tushingham, two possible explanations have been reported: the first was originally put forward by Eilert Ekwall, who concluded that it referred to "the village of Tunsige's people", but a more recent suggestion is that a more direct origin from the Middle English "tuss(h)e" (a tuft of grass or rushes) and "ing" (a place) with "ham" yields a meaning of "the village in the place where tufts of grasses or rushes grow". All the forms of the name that Dodgson records from the Domesday Book onwards begin with "Tus-" as opposed to "Tuns-": Tusigeham, Tussinhgham, Tussincham, Tussingeham, and Tussyncam.

== Governance ==
Tushingham was originally a township in Malpas ancient parish which obtained its separate civil parish status in 1866. As a separate civil parish it has sometimes been known as "Tushingham" or "Tushingham with Grindley". It was originally in Broxton Hundred. From 1837 to 1857 it was in Nantwich Poor law union, and from 1857 to 1930 in Whitchurch (in Shropshire) poor law union. It was also part of Whitchurch rural sanitary district. Following the local government restructuring at the end of the nineteenth century, when local districts were formed using rural sanitary districts as a guide, Tushingham joined Malpas Rural District and remained there from 1894 to 1936. From 1936 to 1974 it became part of Tarvin Rural District. From 1974 to 2009 it was part of Chester district, and is currently part of the unitary authority area of Cheshire West and Chester. On 1 April 2015 the parish was abolished to form "Tushingham-cum-Grindley, Macefen and Bradley".

St Chad's Chapel, Tushingham is a Grade I listed building, and it is reported that there appears to have been a chapel present there since the fourteenth century.

== See also ==
- Listed buildings in Tushingham cum Grindley

== Notes and references ==
=== Bibliography ===
- Dodgson, J. McN. (1972), The place-names of Cheshire. Part four: The place-names of Broxton Hundred and Wirral Hundred, Cambridge: Cambridge University Press, ISBN 0-521-08247-1
- Youngs, F. A. (1991), Guide to the local administrative units of England. Volume II: Northern England, London: Royal Historical Society, ISBN 0-86193-127-0
