= Higher Hall =

Farmhouse in Cheshire, England

Coordinates: 53.0482°N 2.7585°W

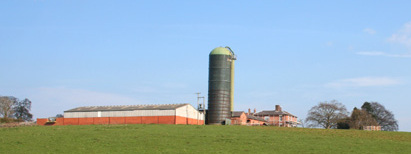
Higher Hall farm buildings

Higher Hall is a farmhouse located to the south of Edge Green in the civil parish of Edge, Cheshire, England. It is recorded in the National Heritage List for England as a designated Grade II listed building.

The house dates from about 1845, and is built on the site of an earlier house. It is constructed in red brick on a stone plinth, and has a slate roof with a tiled ridge. The house consists of a rectangular block with a wing to the rear. The windows in the front of the house are sashes, and elsewhere there is a mixture of sash windows and casements. At the front of the house is a timber porch on a stone plinth with octagonal columns, behind which are pilasters.

== See also ==
- Listed buildings in Edge, Cheshire
