= Overton Hall, Cheshire =

Country house in Cheshire, England

Coordinates: 53.02991°N 2.78973°W

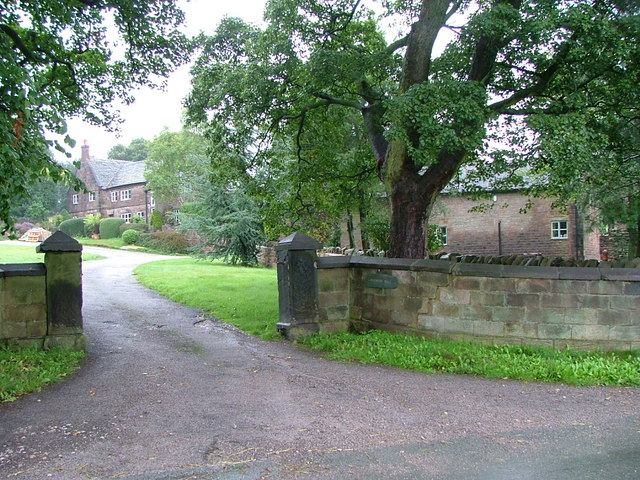
Overton Hall

Overton Hall is a country house in the parish of Malpas (formerly Overton), Cheshire, England. The house originated in the middle of the 16th century on a moated site as a timber-framed great hall with a screens passage; it was built for the Alport family. The great hall has since been divided into two floors, and the house was externally refaced in the early 19th century by the Gregson family. Two of the faces of the house are timber-framed with painted brick nogging. The other faces are in brick with stone dressings. The roofs are slated with tiles on the ridges. The chimney stacks, porch and bay windows are in stone. The house is recorded in the National Heritage List for England as a designated Grade II listed building. To the south of the house is a stone bridge over the former moat dating from the 18th century. This is also listed at Grade II. Immediately to the east of the hall are the remains of a medieval and post-medieval settlement and field system that are recognised as a Scheduled Monument.

== See also ==
- Listed buildings in Overton, Cheshire
