= Cuddington Heath =

Civil parish in Cheshire, England

Coordinates: 53.015°N 2.790°W

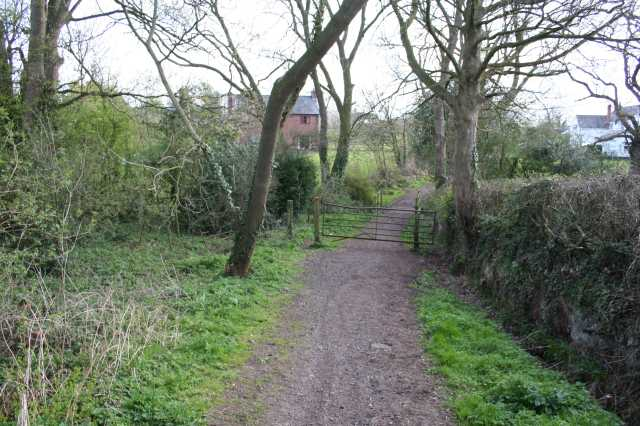
- Bishop Bennet Way, Cuddington Heath

- Location within Cheshire
- OS grid reference: SJ470468
- Civil parish: Cuddington
- Unitary authority: Cheshire West and Chester
- Ceremonial county: Cheshire
- Region: North West
- Country: England
- Sovereign state: United Kingdom
- Post town: MALPAS
- Postcode district: SY14
- Dialling code: 01948
- Police: Cheshire
- Fire: Cheshire
- Ambulance: North West
- UK Parliament: Chester South and Eddisbury

Cuddington Heath is a village and (as Cuddington) a civil parish in the unitary authority of Cheshire West and Chester and the ceremonial county of Cheshire, England. The village is close to the border with Wales (the parish touches the Welsh community of Willington Worthenbury), and the nearest large town is Wrexham in Wales, about ten miles west. Other nearby villages are Threapwood, Malpas and Chorlton Lane. At the 2001 Census, the parish had a population of 180, falling slightly to 171 at the 2011 Census.

The parish is the site of Cuddington Hall. The Stockton family were lords of the manor from the 16th to the 18th century.

== Notable people ==
- Thomas Stockton (1609-1674), a barrister and later a High Court judge in Ireland; an eminent member of the Stockton family
- Keith Bebbington (born 1943), former footballer who played 398 games, incl. 237 for Oldham Athletic A.F.C.
