= Bell o' th' Hill =

Settlement in England

Coordinates: 53.003780°N 2.712265°W

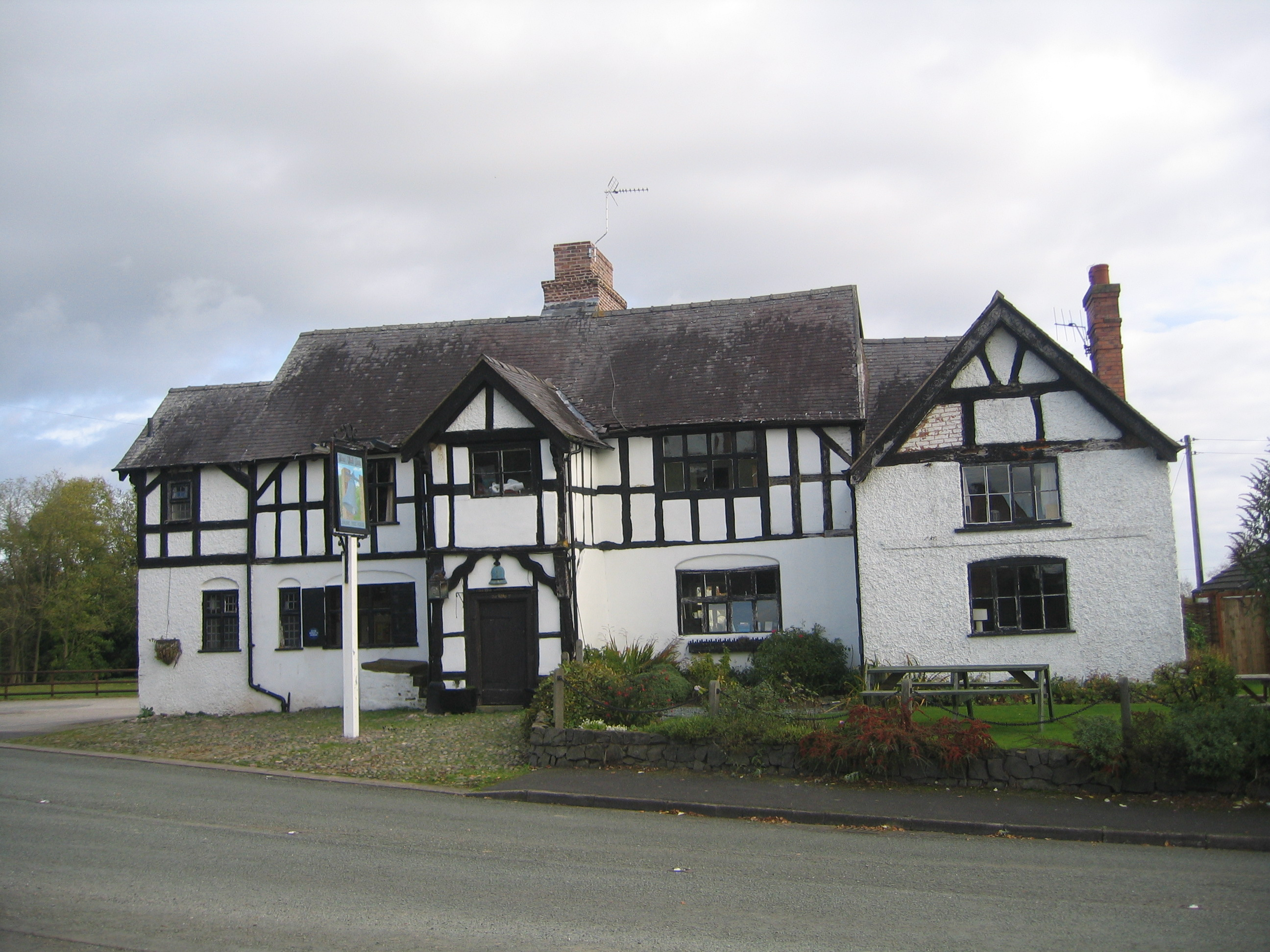
- The Blue Bell, at Bell o' th' Hill

- Location within Cheshire
- OS grid reference: SJ523454
- Civil parish: Tushingham-cum-Grindley, Macefen and Bradley
- Unitary authority: Cheshire West and Chester
- Ceremonial county: Cheshire
- Region: North West
- Country: England
- Sovereign state: United Kingdom
- Post town: WHITCHURCH
- Postcode district: SY13
- Dialling code: 01948
- Police: Cheshire
- Fire: Cheshire
- Ambulance: North West
- UK Parliament: Chester South and Eddisbury

Bell o' th' Hill is a small, scattered settlement in the unitary authority of Cheshire West and Chester and the ceremonial county of Cheshire, England, close to the border with Shropshire. Until 2015 it was in the civil parish of Tushingham cum Grindley: it is now in the civil parish of Tushingham-cum-Grindley, Macefen and Bradley. The settlement is adjacent to the A41 road north of Whitchurch, and an earlier line of the main road passes through it.

The unusual place-name has been supposed to be a back-formation from that of the historic "Bell on the Hill" inn, but the inn name may in fact have been suggested by the earlier forms "Belle Hill", recorded in 1610, and "Bellow Hill", noted 1675, possibly an Old English name from belg and hläw ("rounded hill"). The Bell was built in 1677 by a London grocer, Edmund Nevitt. Now named the Blue Bell, it was Grade II listed in 1967.

A document of 1314 refers to an assart between "le Castelward" and Tushingham Hall, which has been taken to suggest the presence of a castle or motte here.
