= Oldcastle, Cheshire =

Former civil parish in Cheshire, England

Coordinates: 53.002°N 2.79°W

Oldcastle
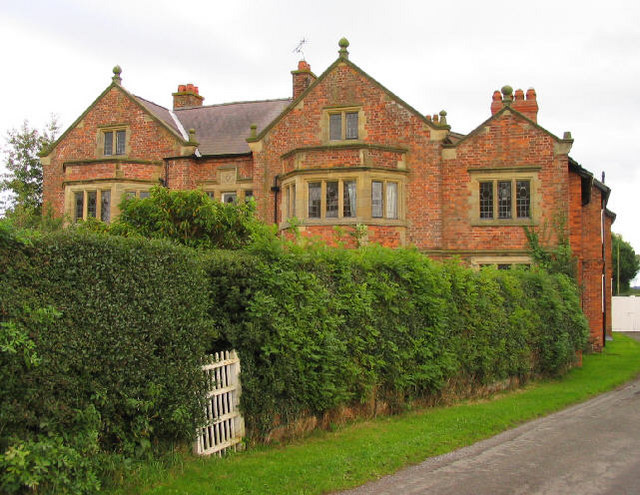
- Oldcastle Heath

- Location within Cheshire
- Population: 54 (2001)
- OS grid reference: SJ471453
- Civil parish: Malpas; Threapwood
- Unitary authority: Cheshire West and Chester
- Ceremonial county: Cheshire
- Region: North West
- Country: England
- Sovereign state: United Kingdom
- Post town: MALPAS
- Postcode district: SY14
- Dialling code: 01948
- Police: Cheshire
- Fire: Cheshire
- Ambulance: North West
- UK Parliament: Chester South and Eddisbury

Oldcastle is a former civil parish, now in the parishes of Malpas and Threapwood, in the Cheshire West and Chester district and ceremonial county of Cheshire in England. In 2001 it had a population of 54.

== History ==
The name "Oldcastle" comes from the presence of an old fortification on a promontory into the valley of the Wych Brook now known as Castle Hill. In July 1957, the felling of trees at Castle Hill revealed an impressive earthwork consisting of a small platform 128 ft by 25 ft defended on the North by two deep transverse ditches, and on the South by three similar ditches. At the NW end, the neck of the spur is cut by 2 ditches, the inner one being 60-70ft wide. There was a limited excavation in August 1957 when a section was cut in the bottom of one of the northern ditches, and trial trenches dug in the platform on the summit. No evidence of date or structural remains were found. Any defensive structure would have been of wood. It is possible that the site is an outpost of the motte and bailey castle at Malpas suggesting, therefore, an 11th or early 12th century date, however it could be much older. The castle had been completely demolished by 1585 according to 'Magna Britannia' (itself citing William Webb's "King's Vale Royal") The area is a scheduled monument.

In August 1644 Oldcastle Heath was the scene of a battle during the English Civil War between the Parliamentary forces out of Nantwich and Royalists who had come south from Lancashire. The Royalists were defeated, and Colonels Vane, Colonel Conyers, and Sergeant-Major Helketh were killed along with 50 or 60 common men.

The southern border, at Wych Brook, marks the boundary between England and Wales (English Maelor in Welsh: Maelor Saesneg). At the time of the Domesday Book (1086) this area and the land to the South were part of the Duddeston (also Dudestan) Hundred under Robert fitzHugh, part of Cheshire previously under Earl Edwin. The southern part of this Hundred became Maelor Saesneg sometime between then and 1202, and the northern part became the Broxton Hundred. Oldcastle was formerly a township in the parish of Malpas within the Broxton hundred, in 1866 Oldcastle became a separate civil parish, on 1 April 2015 the parish was abolished and merged into Malpas and Threapwood.
