= Chris Michell =

English flautist and composer

AKA Christa Michell (née Christine Margaret Hughes; born 1951), is an English flautist and composer of ambient-classic and New Age music; Dolphin Love album (1991) was an early example of the New Age genre, with dolphin, whale and sea sounds, intrinsic to the musical texture.

== Early life and education ==
With Welsh, Scottish and Irish ancestry, Hughes was born in Hampton, near Malpas, Cheshire, England. She attended the University of Liverpool BA Hons. (1969—72) and the Guildhall School of Music (1972—73)London, PG Performing, Christ's College Woolton (1973-1974) PGCE.

== Career ==
Michell became sub-principal flute/piccolo with Welsh National Opera for five years (1976—81), as well as freelancing with Royal Liverpool Philharmonic Orchestra, BBC, English National Ballet, Opera North, Manchester Camerata, and Northern Ballet until 1986. Her teaching positions included the Royal College of Music's junior department, Lancaster University, Putney High School, Royal High School, Bath, and Wells Cathedral School, Somerset.

A serious car accident and the death of her baby son Thomas Oliver, set her on the spiritual path, and she found healing and peace, when she started to write her own music in 1990, which she felt, had been 'channelled' to her by the dolphins.

Michell started her independent record label, Astarte Music Productions, in 1989. Mark Vibrans produced her first album Song for Sophie 1989 for Astarte Music. Michell also started performing with Nigel Shaw at this time and developed the free improvisatory style that became their trademark, in the album Dreaming Pool 1990. In 1991 she recorded Dolphin Love with Clifford White and Arnie Sage and this proved to be a popular album in UK, USA and Australia.

After performing at an International New Age Music Conference in Los Angeles in 1991, Michell was offered a record deal with World Discs, USA and later Northsound, USA (now liquidated); as well as with New World in Australia and Oreade Music, Netherlands.

In 1999, Michell (as Christa Michell) recorded Tibetan Chakra Meditations with Ben Scott, giving a 5% Royalty from each album sold to the Tibet Relief Fund, London.

In 2001 she had a personal audience and performed for the Dalai Lama in Dharamsala, India. She presented him with her album Tibetan Freedom Chants, which was recorded with monk Ven. Bhagdro, to raise money and awareness for the Tibetan cause.

== Discography ==
Album name	Year	Record Company
Song for Sophie	1989	Astarte Music Productions (UK)
Dreaming Pool (with Nigel Shaw)	1990	DPP/ Astarte Music Productions (UK)
Dolphin Love	1991	Astarte Music Productions (UK), World Discs (USA), Oreade Music (Netherlands) and New World (Australia)
Evening Light	1992	World Discs (USA)
Celestial Harmony	1993	Astarte Music Productions (UK)
Capricorn	1993	Oreade Music (Netherlands)
Serenity (Lovestreams)	1994	Astarte Music Productions (UK) and World Discs (USA)
Dreamtime Dolphin	1996	Oreade Music (Netherlands)
Crystal Dolphin Meditations	1996	Astarte Music Productions (UK)
Summer Dreams	1996	Northsound Music (USA)
Isle of Avalon (with Stuart Gordon)	1998	Northsound Music (USA)
Dolphin Song (with Stuart Gordon)	1998	Oreade Music (Netherlands)
Celtic Love (with Stuart Gordon)	1999	Delphi Music (UK)
Tibetan Chakra Meditations (with Ben Scott)	1999	Oreade Music (Netherlands)
Dolphin Music for the Inner Child (with Mike Rowland)	2001	Oreade Music (Netherlands)
Tibetan Freedom Chants (with Ven. Bhagdro)	2002	Oreade Music (Netherlands)
Ocean of Love	2003	Oreade Music (Netherlands)
The Last Whale	2006	Oreade Music (Netherlands)
Reflections	2007	Oreade Music (Netherlands)
