= Listed buildings in Overton, Malpas =

Overton is a former civil parish, now in the parish of Malpas, in Cheshire West and Chester, England. It contains five buildings that are recorded in the National Heritage List for England as designated listed buildings, all of which are at Grade II. This grade is the lowest of the three gradings given to listed buildings and is applied to "buildings of national importance and special interest". The parish is entirely rural, and all the listed buildings are domestic or related to houses.

Name and location	Photograph	Date	Notes
Overton Hall; 53.0299°N 2.7897°W	—	Mid- to late 16th century	A country house that originated as a timber-framed great hall on a moated site. In the 19th century a wing was added, and the exterior was partly refaced in brick. Two faces are now timber-framed with brick nogging, and the other two faces are in brick with stone dressings. The roofs are slated with ridge tiles. The house is in two storeys with an L-shaped plan. The windows in the older part are sashes, and in the later part they are casements.
Overton Manor; 53.0299°N 2.7766°W	—	c. 1711	This was originally a farmhouse, with the addition of a wing and other alterations in the 19th century. The house is built in brick on a stone plinth with stone dressings. It has a slate roof with a tiled ridge. The house has two storeys, attics and cellars, and a three-bay front, with pilasters separating the bays and at the sides. The windows are casements and there is a bay window on the right. Over the doorway is a rectangular fanlight.
Gate piers, Overton Manor; 53.02972°N 2.77653°W	—	Early 18th century	The gate piers are in brick on a stone plinth. They are square in plan, and are surmounted by bal finials on stems.
Bridge, Overton Hall; 53.02950°N 2.78989°W	—	18th century (possible)	A stone bridge crossing the moat to the south of the hall, with a pointed arch.
Kidnall Grange Farmhouse; 53.0380°N 2.7857°W		Late 18th century	Additions including a rear wing were added in the early 19th century. The farmhouse is built in brick with a slate roof and tiled ridge. It has a T-shaped plan, and is in two storeys with attics. The right side is gabled and contains a bay window. On the apex of the gable is a moulded pyramidal finial. In the older part, most of the windows are sashes, and in the newer part they are casements under Gothick heads.
