= Prior's Heys =

Former civil parish in England

Coordinates: 53.195°N 2.708°W

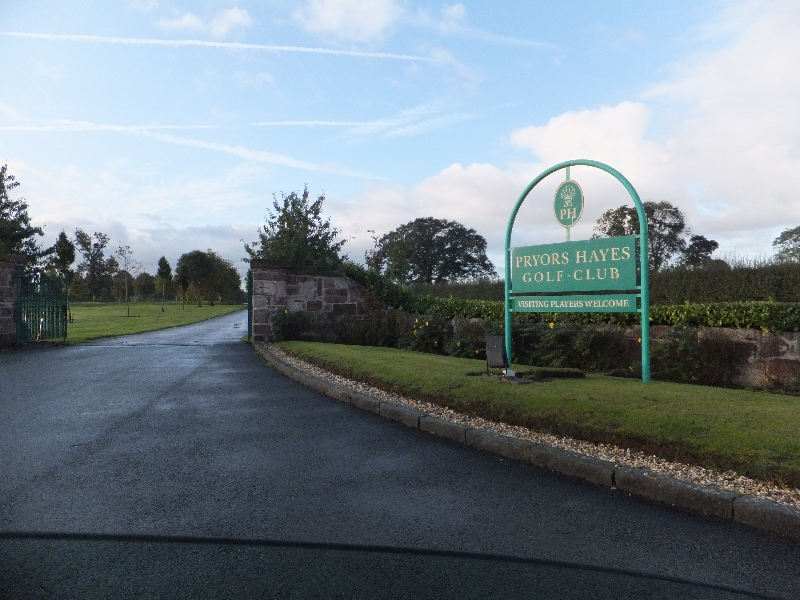
- Golf course entrance, Prior's Heys

- Location within Cheshire
- Population: 10 (2001)
- OS grid reference: SJ5166
- Civil parish: Tarvin
- Unitary authority: Cheshire West and Chester
- Ceremonial county: Cheshire
- Region: North West
- Country: England
- Sovereign state: United Kingdom
- Post town: CHESTER
- Postcode district: CH3
- Dialling code: 01829
- Police: Cheshire
- Fire: Cheshire
- Ambulance: North West
- UK Parliament: Chester South and Eddisbury

Prior's Heys is a former civil parish, now part of the parish of Tarvin in the Cheshire West and Chester district and ceremonial county of Cheshire, England. As of 2001, it had a population of 10. Originally an extra-parochial area, Priors Heys became a civil parish in 1858. On 1 April 2015, the parish was abolished and merged with Tarvin.
