= Edge Hall =

Country house in Edge, Cheshire, England

Coordinates: 53.04748°N 2.77578°W

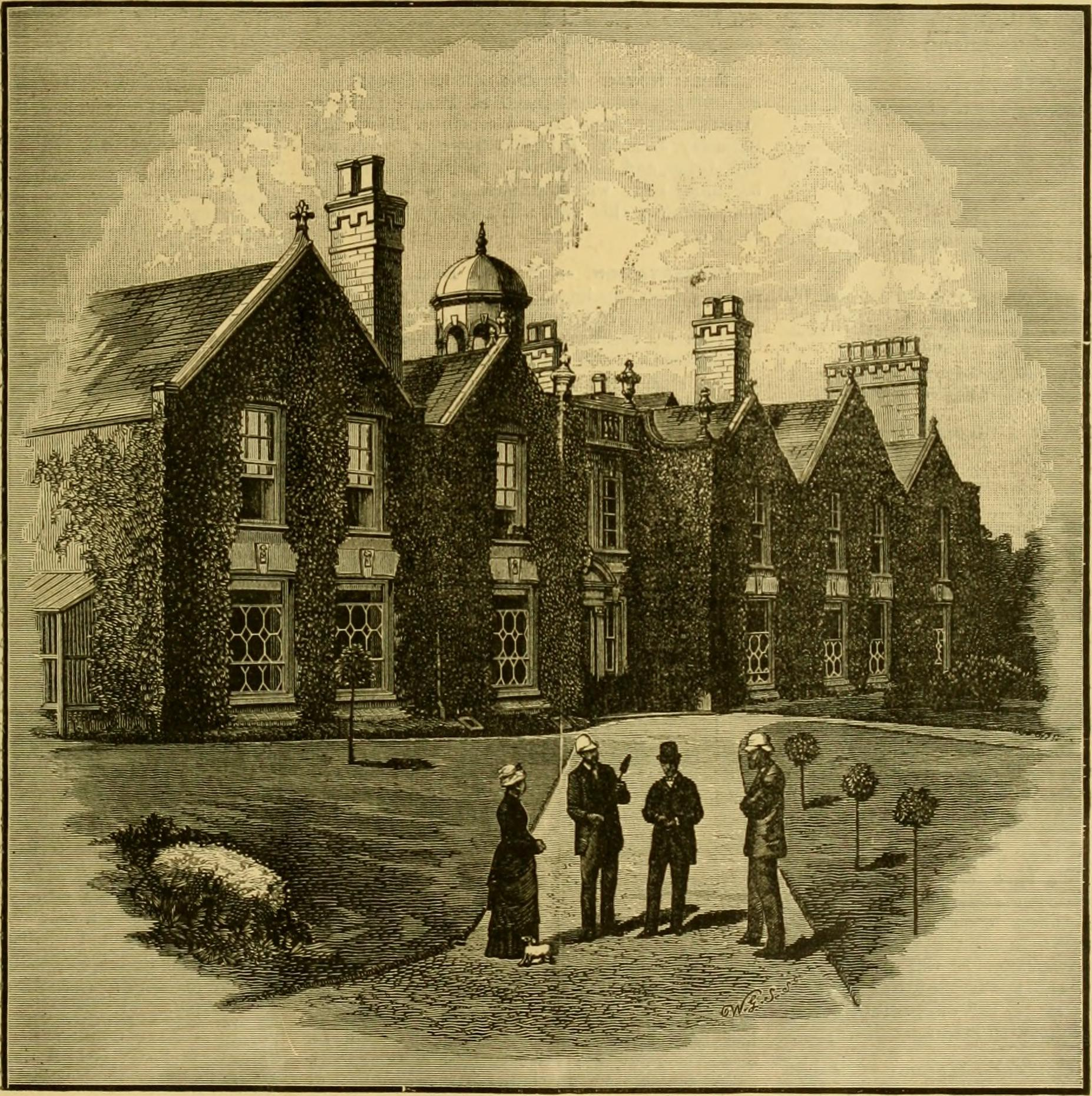

Edge Hall is a 9 bedroom, country house located at Hall Lane, Brasseys Contract Road, Edge, Cheshire, SY14 8LE, England. The house is recorded in the National Heritage List for England as a designated Grade II* listed building. It was the ancestral home of the Dod family from the twelfth century (if not earlier) to the early twenty first century. The core of the house dates from about 1600. The main part of the building dates from 1721, and additions have been made from about 1790, and later. Its architectural style is Jacobean. The house is constructed in brick, standing on stone plinths, and has a slate roof.

== See also ==
- Grade II* listed buildings in Cheshire West and Chester
- Listed buildings in Edge, Cheshire
