= Listed buildings in Wychough =

Wychough is a former civil parish in Cheshire West and Chester, England. It contained two buildings that are recorded in the National Heritage List for England as designated listed buildings, both of which are listed at Grade II. This grade is the lowest of the three gradings given to listed buildings and is applied to "buildings of national importance and special interest". The parish is entirely rural, and the listed building are a farmhouse and a dovecote.

Name and location	Photograph	Date	Notes
Wychough Hill Farmhouse; 52.99704°N 2.76597°W	—	Mid 17th century (probable)	The farmhouse is timber-framed, and was encased in brick probably in the 19th century. It has a slate roof and has roughly a T-shaped plan. The farmhouse is in two and 1 1/2 storeys. Inside is an inglenook with a bressumer.
Dovecot, Manor Farm; 53.00800°N 2.76925°W	—	c. 1800	The dovecote stands in the farmyard and is Georgian in style. It is built in brick with a pyramidal slate roof, surmounted by a louvre vent and a weathervane. The dovecot is in three storeys, and has a doorway in the ground floor, lozenge-shaped ventilation holes in the middle storey, and in the top storey is a landing platform and pentagonal flight holes. Inside are three rows of eight nesting boxes on each side of the top storey.
