= Listed buildings in Threapwood =

Threapwood is a civil parish in Cheshire West and Chester, England. It contains three buildings that are recorded in the National Heritage List for England as designated listed buildings. Of these, one is listed at Grade II*, the middle grade, and the other two are at Grade II. Apart from the village of Threapwood, the parish is entirely rural. The listed buildings consist of a church, its gates and walls, and a derelict windmill.

== Key ==
Grade	Criteria
II*	Particularly important buildings of more than special interest
II	Buildings of national importance and special interest

== Buildings ==
Name and location	Photograph	Date	Notes	Grade
Windmill; 53.00137°N 2.83179°W		18th century	The windmill is derelict. It consists of a three-storey brick tower, which is bottle-shaped and tapering. The superstructure and roof are missing. There are arched openings for a door and for windows.	II
St John's Church; 53.0024°N 2.8359°W		1815	The church is built in brick with a slate roof, and is in Georgian style. It has a rectangular plan, with an open octagonal cupola at the west end. There are pedimented doorways at the west end, and in the middle of the south side. Inside the church are galleries on three sides, and box pews.	II*
Walls, gates, piers and railings, St John's Church; 53.00230°N 2.83622°W		1815 (presumed)	The walls are low and in brick, with piers at the corners. The wall and piers have stone copings, and the walls carry iron railings. The gate piers and gates are decorative and in wrought iron.	II
