= St John's Church, Threapwood =

Coordinates: 53.0024°N 2.8359°W

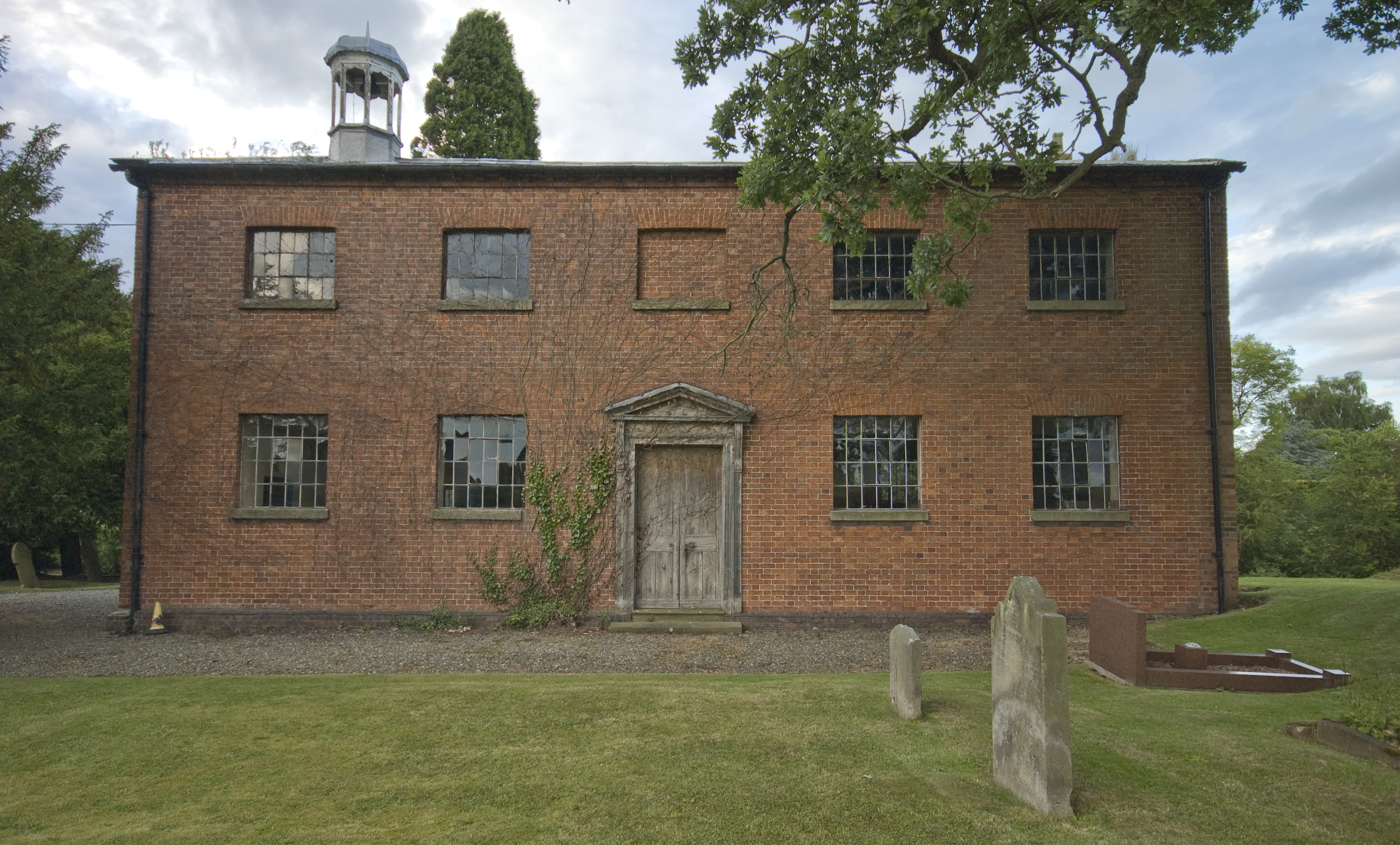
- St John's Church, Threapwood, from the south

- Location in Cheshire
- OS grid reference: SJ 439 456
- Location: Threapwood, Cheshire
- Country: England
- Denomination: Anglican
- Website: St John, Threapwood

History
- Status: Parish church

Architecture
- Functional status: Active
- Heritage designation: Grade II*
- Designated: 1 March 1967
- Architectural type: Church
- Style: Georgian
- Completed: 1815

Specifications
- Materials: Brick with slate roof

Administration
- Province: York
- Diocese: Chester
- Archdeaconry: Chester
- Deanery: Malpas
- Parish: St Oswald, Malpas, and St John, Threapwood

Clergy
- Rector: Revd Canon Ian Arthan Davenport

St John's Church is in the village of Threapwood, Cheshire, England. It is an active Anglican parish church in the diocese of Chester, the archdeaconry of Chester, and the deanery of Malpas. Its benefice is combined with those of St Oswald, Malpas and Holy Trinity, Bickerton. The church is recorded in the National Heritage List for England as a designated Grade II* listed building. The authors of the Buildings of England series state that it is entirely Georgian in style.

== History ==
The church was built in 1815 as an extra-parochial chapel. The parish of St John's was established in 1817.

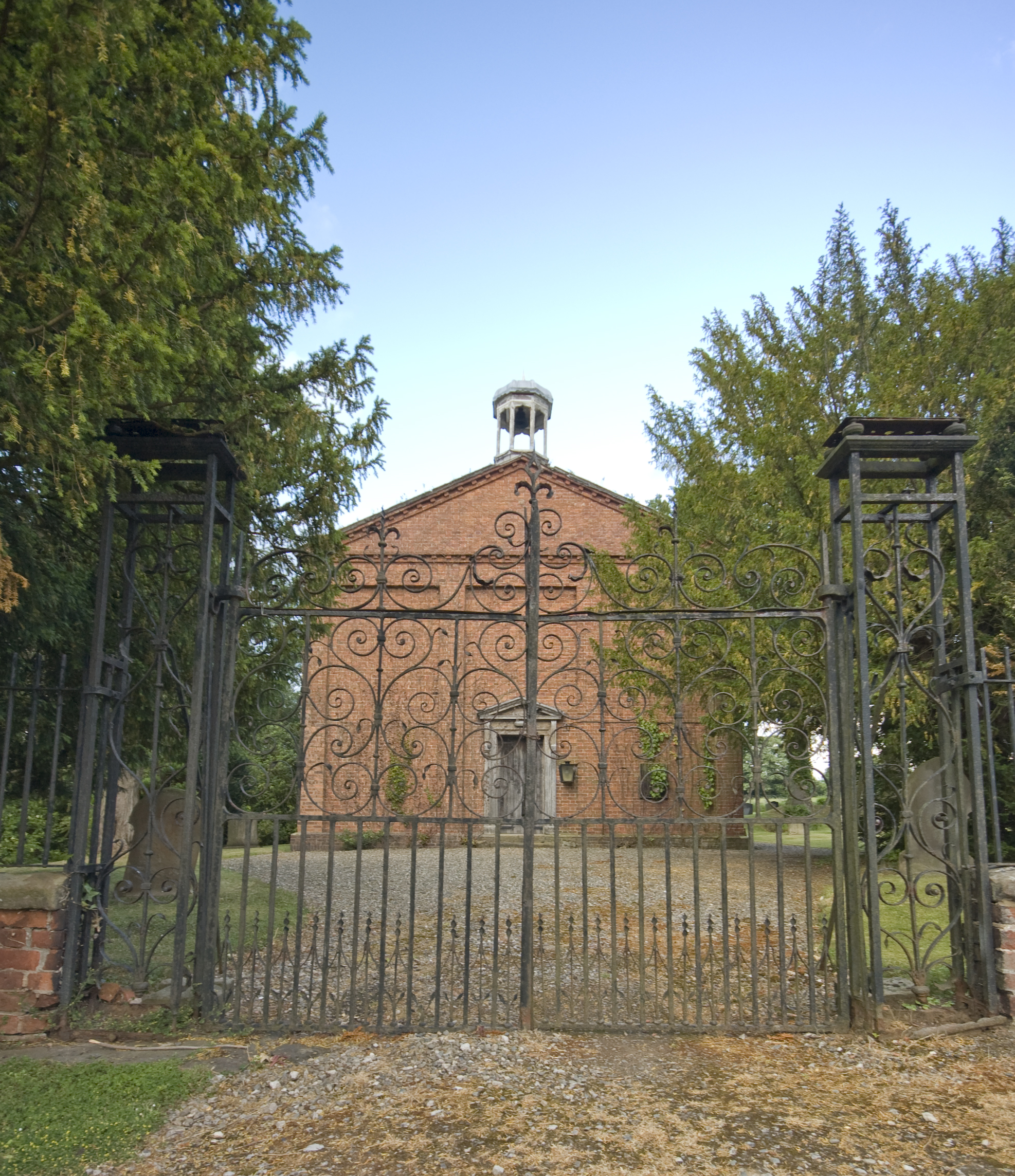
Gates and west façade

== Architecture ==
St John's is a rectangular church in Georgian style. It is constructed in brick, and has a slate roof. At the west end is an open octagonal cupola. There are pedimented doorways at the west end, and in the middle of the south side.

Inside the church are galleries on three sides, with the north and south galleries curving round to the west gallery. They are carried on iron columns with an iron parapet. The two chandeliers are in brass and are dated 1817. The altar rails are in iron, and are on three sides of the altar. On the two sides of the altar are box pews with brass name plates for the patrons, the Broughton and Kenyon families. The panelled timber reredos is in three parts, bearing the Lord's Prayer and the creed to the left and the right and an extract from Exodus in a divided central panel.

== External features ==
The gatepiers, gates, wall, piers and railings to the church are listed at Grade II. The churchyard contains the war grave of a South Wales Borderers soldier of World War I.

== See also ==
- Listed buildings in Threapwood
