= Grafton, Cheshire =

Former civil parish in Cheshire, England

Coordinates: 53.057°N 2.828°W

Grafton
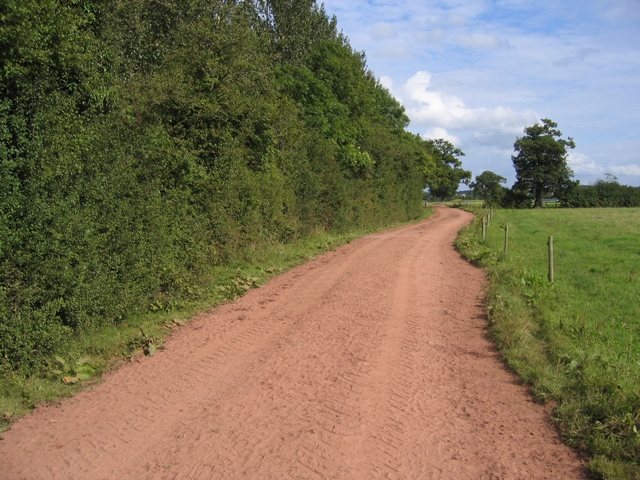
- Red track by Grafton Hall

- Location within Cheshire
- Population: 3 (2001)
- OS grid reference: SJ4451
- Civil parish: Tilston
- Unitary authority: Cheshire West and Chester
- Ceremonial county: Cheshire
- Region: North West
- Country: England
- Sovereign state: United Kingdom
- Post town: MALPAS
- Postcode district: SY14
- Dialling code: 01829
- Police: Cheshire
- Fire: Cheshire
- Ambulance: North West
- UK Parliament: Chester South and Eddisbury

Grafton is a former civil parish, now in the parish of Tilston, in the Cheshire West and Chester district and ceremonial county of Cheshire in England. In 2001 it had a population of 3. Grafton was formerly a township in the parish of Tilston, in 1866 Grafton became a separate civil parish, on 1 April 2015 the parish was abolished and merged with Tilston.
