= Cotton Abbotts =

Former civil parish in Cheshire, England

Coordinates: 53.175°N 2.802°W

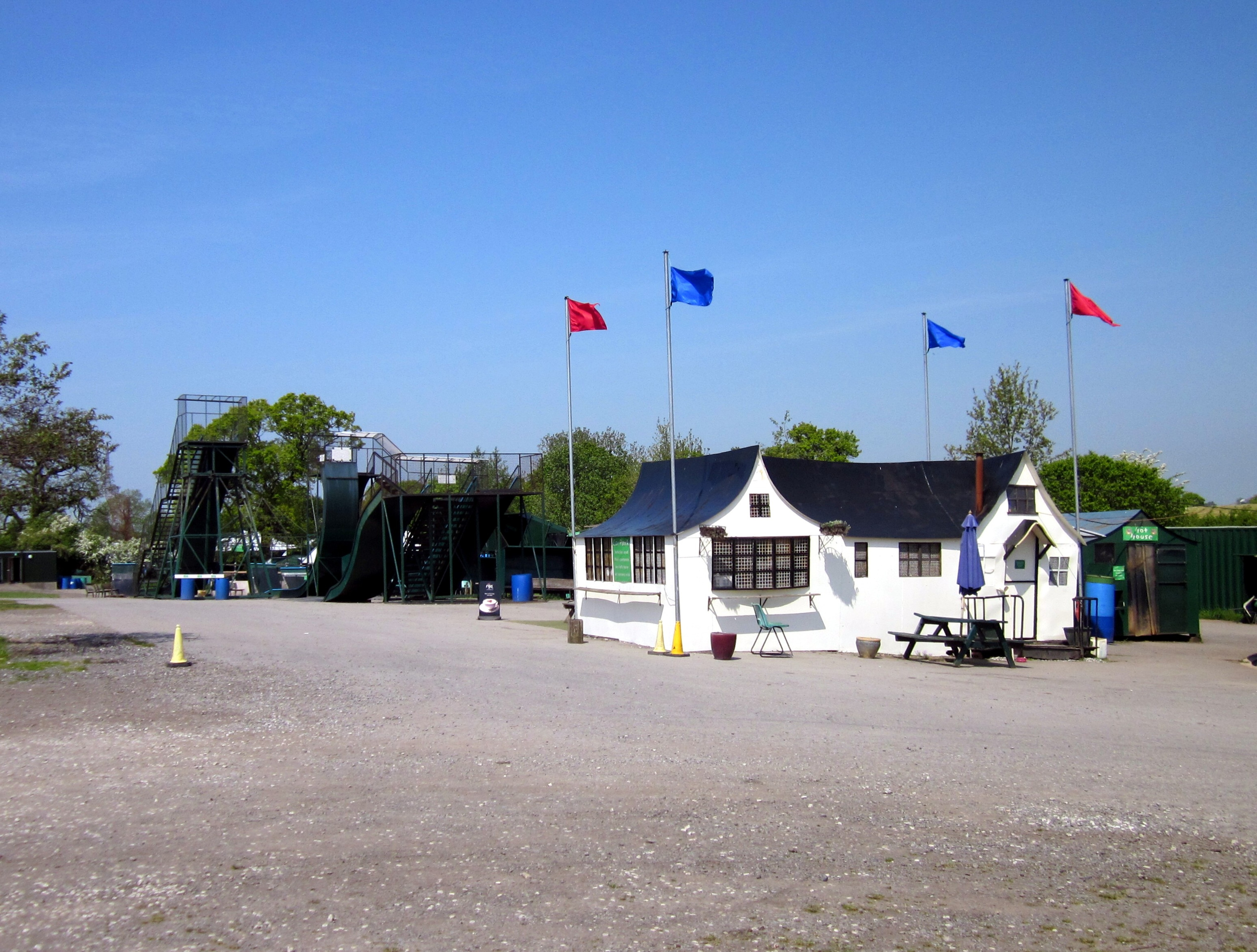
- The Crocky Trail, Cotton Abbotts

- Location within Cheshire
- Population: 3 (2001)
- OS grid reference: SJ4664
- Civil parish: Waverton
- Unitary authority: Cheshire West and Chester
- Ceremonial county: Cheshire
- Region: North West
- Country: England
- Sovereign state: United Kingdom
- Post town: CHESTER
- Postcode district: CH3
- Dialling code: 01244
- Police: Cheshire
- Fire: Cheshire
- Ambulance: North West
- UK Parliament: Chester South and Eddisbury

Cotton Abbotts is a former civil parish, now in the parish of Waverton, in the borough of Cheshire West and Chester and ceremonial county of Cheshire in England. In 2001 it had a population of 3. Cotton-Abbotts was formerly a township in the parish of Christleton, in 1866 Cotton Abbotts became a separate civil parish, on 1 April 2015 the parish was abolished and merged with Waverton.
