= Macefen =

Former civil parish in Cheshire, England

Coordinates: 53.026°N 2.724°W

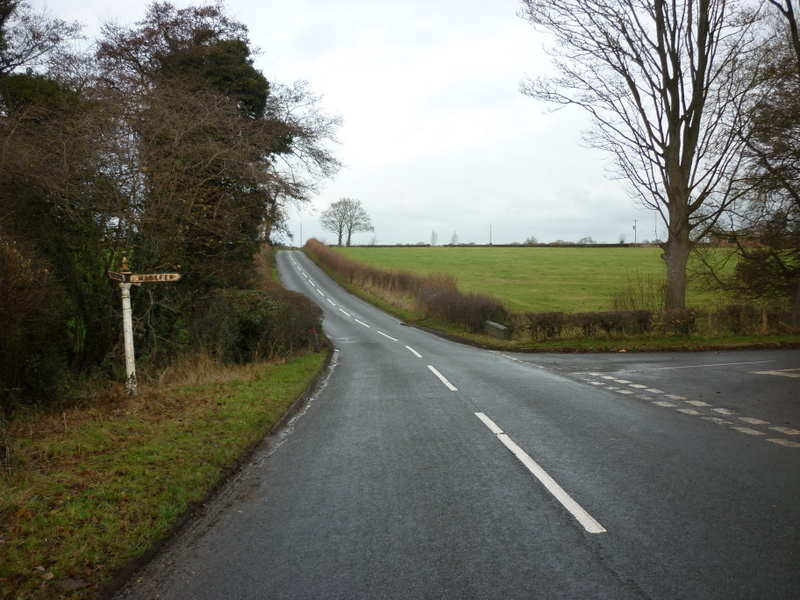
- Minor road in Macefen

- Location within Cheshire
- Population: 81 (2001 census)
- OS grid reference: SJ514479
- Civil parish: Tushingham-cum-Grindley, Macefen and Bradley; No Man's Heath and District
- Unitary authority: Cheshire West and Chester
- Ceremonial county: Cheshire
- Region: North West
- Country: England
- Sovereign state: United Kingdom
- Post town: MALPAS
- Postcode district: SY14
- Dialling code: 01948
- Police: Cheshire
- Fire: Cheshire
- Ambulance: North West
- UK Parliament: Chester South and Eddisbury

Macefen is a former civil parish, now in the parishes of Tushingham-cum-Grindley, Macefen and Bradley and No Man's Heath and District, in the unitary authority area of Cheshire West and Chester and the ceremonial county of Cheshire, England. Macefen lies 2 miles (3.2 km) east of the village of Malpas and 5 miles (8.0 km) north west of Whitchurch, Salop. Part of the village of No Man's Heath was within the northern boundary of Macefen. Its name is thought to possibly be an anglicisation of an older Welsh placename Maes-y-ffin, "the open field (maes) at the boundary (ffin)". In 2001 the parish had a population of 81.

Macefen was a slightly curious parish in that it scarcely appears in gazetteers. Under the manorial system Macefen was a manor of the Barony of Malpas, and was for many years part of the estates of the Grosvenor family. Later it was a township of the ancient parish of Malpas, in 1866 Macefen became a separate civil parish. Kelly's Directory of Cheshire, 1914 lists Macefen under Tushingham cum Grindley thus: "Macefen (or Maesfen) is a small township in the Whitchurch union, 2 miles south from Malpas station. The Hon. Mrs. Algernon R. Parker, who has a residence here [at grid reference SJ518466 on the north side of Bradley Lane], is lady of the manor and sole landowner." It never had its own church but was served by adjacent churches. The civil parish was abolished on 1 April 2015 to form "Tushingham-cum-Grindley, Macefen and Bradley" and "No Man's Heath and District".
