= Wych Brook =

River in Wales and England

Wych Brook River Elfe, Red Brook, Worthenbury Brook
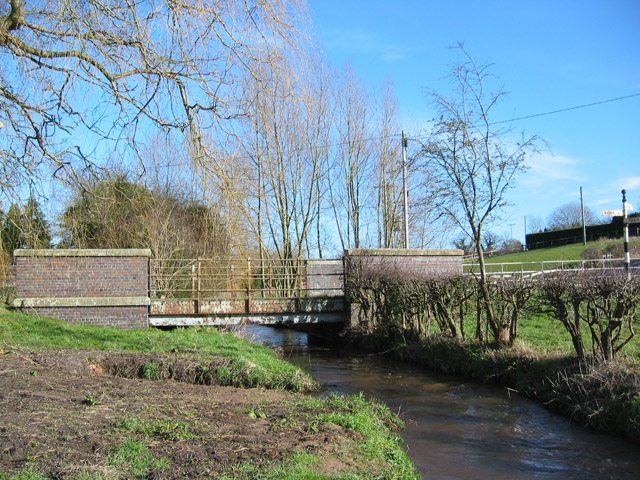
- The Wych Brook at Higher Wych

Location
- Country: Wales, England
- Counties: Wrexham County Borough, Cheshire, Shropshire

Physical characteristics
- Source
  - location: Fenn's Moss, Wrexham County Borough
  - coordinates: 52.99352°N 2.82339°W
- Mouth: River Dee
  - location: near Shocklach
  - coordinates: 53°2′19″N 2°51′42″W

Basin features
- Tributaries
  - left: Emral Brook

The Wych Brook, Worthenbury Brook and Red Brook, formerly known as the River Elfe, is a tributary of the River Dee in England and Wales, forming part of both the historic and present-day border between the two countries. The stream forms part of the border between Cheshire and Shropshire in England to the east, and Wales, particularly the Maelor Saesneg (a detached portion of Historic Flintshire, now within Wrexham County Borough), to the west.

== Course and landscape ==
The Wych Brook rises (as the "Red Brook") at Fenn's Moss on the Wrexham County Borough / Shropshire border, and flows northward and westward through a steep-sided, wooded valley to Threapwood, being joined by several smaller streams such as the Grindley Brook, which rises near the village of the same name, and the Iscoyd Brook. Near the community of Willington Worthenbury it is joined by the Emral Brook, and runs northward to the Dee (as the "Worthenbury Brook") near Shocklach. The Emral Brook itself rises near Penley and is joined by a number of tributary streams which drain the central part of Maelor Saesneg.

The middle section of the river valley, which has eroded deeply into an underlying glacial drift of boulder clay, sands and gravels, is the narrowest and deepest, particularly between Dymock's Mill and Lower Wych. The river landscape is characterised by ancient mixed ash woodland, unintensively-farmed lowland pasture and rush pasture. The English side of the valley is designated as an Area of Special County Value.

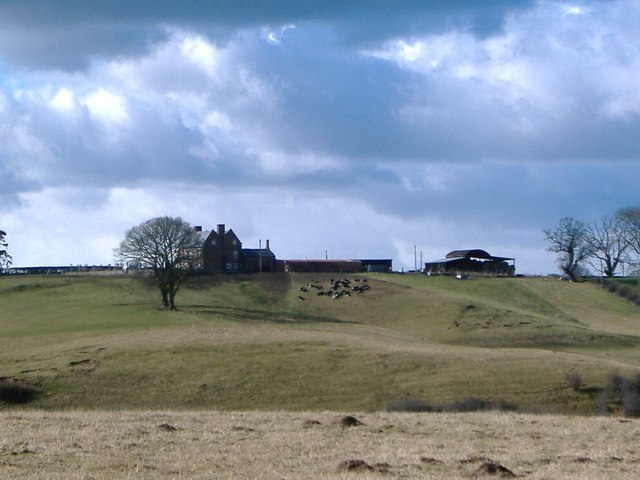
Typical landscape of the Wych Brook valley: the foreground is in England and the rising ground in the distance in Wales.

The Wych Brook was formerly known as the River Elfe or Elf. The origin of the name "Elfe" is in this case unknown, though the name "Wych" is thought to derive from saline springs in the area. There were formerly a number of natural salt springs or 'brine pits' near the river bank at Higher Wych and Lower Wych, which from medieval times were used as a water source for commercial salt production. It has been speculated that the river name Elfe is based on the Welsh language root hal-, halen, "salt".

== Ecology ==
The river is a habitat for a variety of fish including brown trout, common dace, the gudgeon Gobio gobio, stone loach and common minnow. There is an unusual isolated population of dormice in the Wych Valley, as a result of an introduction of animals in 1996/7.
