= Tenzin Bagdro =

Tibetan Buddhist monk

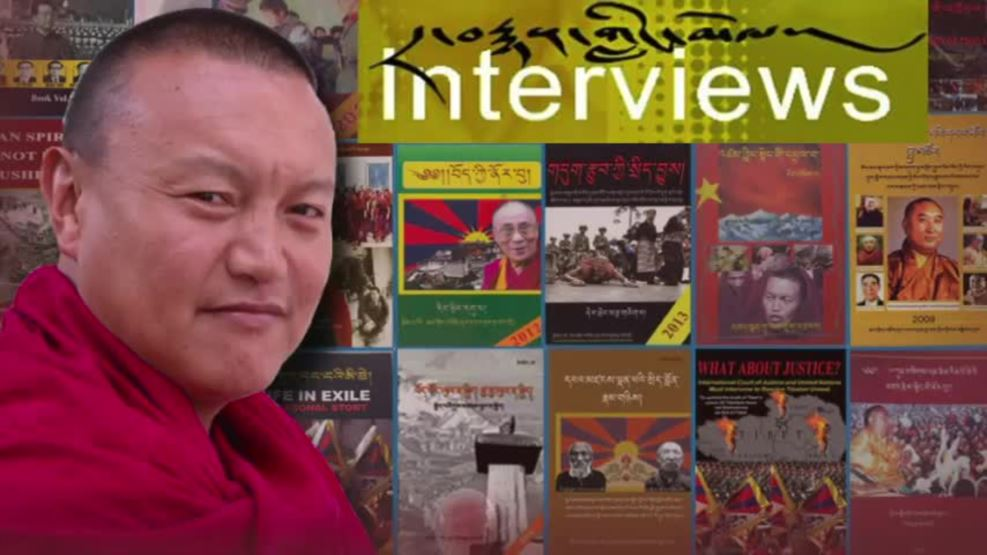
Kusho Bagdro

Tenzin Bagdro (born 1968) is a Tibetan Buddhist monk and former political prisoner who currently resides at Tashi Choeling Monastery in McLeod Ganj, Dharamshala, Himachal Pradesh, India, home of the Dalai Lama and the Tibetan government-in-exile.

He has authored eight books including A Hell on Earth which has been translated into five languages about his experiences being captured, imprisoned, and tortured by the Chinese government for demonstrating in Lhasa for Tibetan freedom. He was in prison for three years, until he escaped and fled to India.

In 2010, Bagdro released his book Life in Exile and "through his new book, the former political prisoner said he wanted to remind the fellow Tibetans in exile about the urgency of the situation inside Tibet."
