= Listed buildings in Wigland =

Wigland is a civil parish in Cheshire West and Chester, England. It contains three buildings that are recorded in the National Heritage List for England as designated listed buildings, all of which are listed at Grade II. This grade is the lowest of the three gradings given to listed buildings and is applied to "buildings of national importance and special interest". The parish is entirely rural, and the listed buildings consist of farmhouses and farm buildings

Name and location	Photograph	Date	Notes
Bank Farmhouse; 52.98728°N 2.75377°W	—	Late 16th century	The farmhouse is basically timber-framed and has been altered and extended. It consists of a main wing and a cross-wing. Some of the timber framing has been encased in brick; elsewhere some of the panels contain wattle and daub, and others have brick nogging. The farmhouse is roofed in slate.
Wigland Hall Farmhouse; 52.99736°N 2.75480°W	—	1800	The farmhouse is in brick with a slate roof. It is in two storeys with an attic. The farmhouse has a symmetrical front with three windows in each floor, and a projecting gabled timber porch. The windows are casements.
Shippon and stable, Wigland Hall Farm; 52.99720°N 2.75550°W	—	c. 1800	The farm buildings are in brick with a slate roof, and have two storeys. The features include archways, ventilation holes, and pitch holes.
