= Stockton, Cheshire =

Former civil parish in Cheshire, England

Coordinates: 53.00°N 2.78°W

Stockton
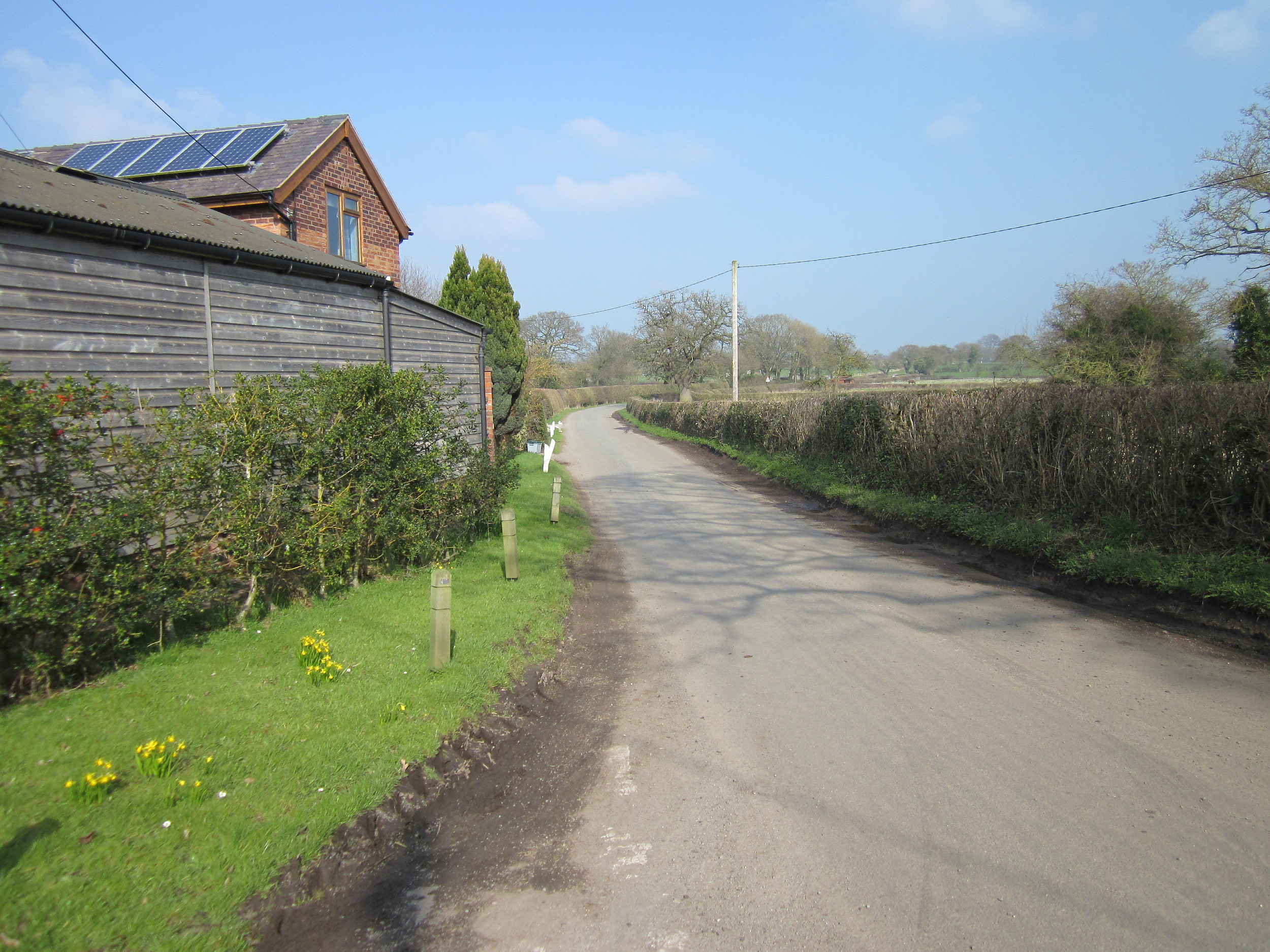

- Location within Cheshire
- Population: 21 (2001)
- OS grid reference: SJ4745
- Civil parish: Malpas
- Unitary authority: Cheshire West and Chester
- Ceremonial county: Cheshire
- Region: North West
- Country: England
- Sovereign state: United Kingdom
- Post town: MALPAS
- Postcode district: SY14
- Dialling code: 01948
- Police: Cheshire
- Fire: Cheshire
- Ambulance: North West
- UK Parliament: Chester South and Eddisbury

Stockton is a former civil parish, now in the parish of Malpas, in the Cheshire West and Chester district and ceremonial county of Cheshire in England. In 2001 it had a population of 21. Stockton was formerly a township in the parish of Malpas, in 1866 Stockton became a separate civil parish, on 1 April 2015 the parish was abolished and merged with Malpas.
