= Newton by Malpas =

Former civil parish in Cheshire, England

Coordinates: 53.006°N 2.793°W

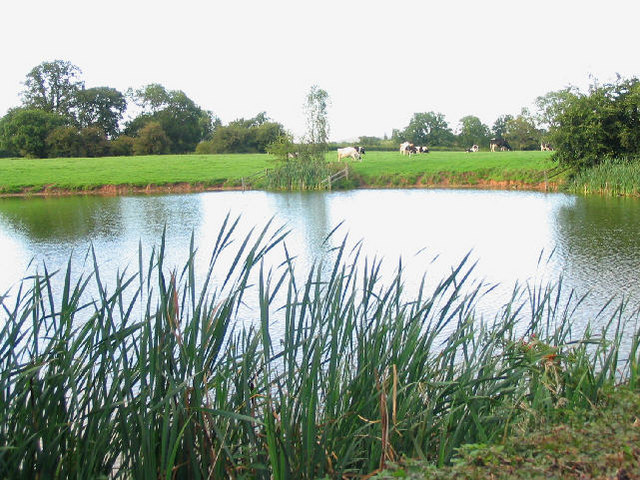
- Lake at Newton Hall

- Location within Cheshire
- Population: 11 (2001)
- OS grid reference: SJ469457
- Civil parish: Malpas
- Unitary authority: Cheshire West and Chester
- Ceremonial county: Cheshire
- Region: North West
- Country: England
- Sovereign state: United Kingdom
- Post town: MALPAS
- Postcode district: SY14
- Dialling code: 01948
- Police: Cheshire
- Fire: Cheshire
- Ambulance: North West
- UK Parliament: Chester South and Eddisbury

Newton by Malpas is a former civil parish, now in the parish of Malpas, in the Cheshire West and Chester district and ceremonial county of Cheshire in England. In 2001 it had a population of 11. Newton-juxta-Malpas was formerly a township in the parish of Malpas, in 1866 Newton by Malpas became a separate civil parish, on 1 April 2015 the parish was abolished and merged with Malpas.
