= Bradley, Cheshire =

Former civil parish in Cheshire, England

Coordinates: 53.006°N 2.733°W

Bradley
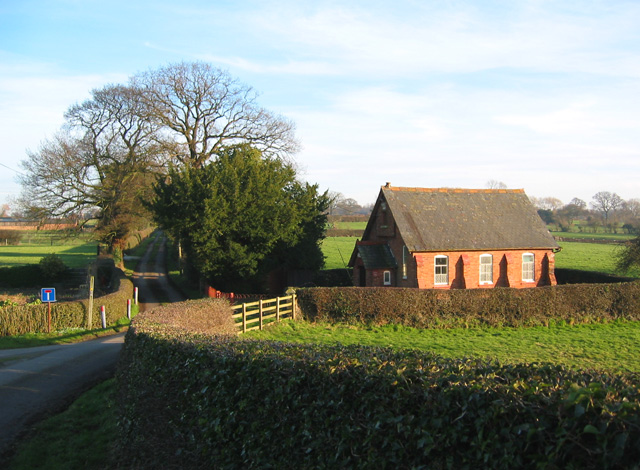
- The chapel at Bradley Common

- Location within Cheshire
- Population: 61 (2001)
- OS grid reference: SJ5045
- Civil parish: Tushingham-cum-Grindley, Macefen and Bradley; Malpas
- Unitary authority: Cheshire West and Chester
- Ceremonial county: Cheshire
- Region: North West
- Country: England
- Sovereign state: United Kingdom
- Post town: WHITCHURCH
- Postcode district: SY13
- Dialling code: 01948
- Police: Cheshire
- Fire: Cheshire
- Ambulance: North West

Bradley is a former civil parish, now in the parishes of Tushingham-cum-Grindley, Macefen and Bradley and Malpas, in the Cheshire West and Chester district, and the ceremonial county of Cheshire in England. In 2001 it had a population of 61. The main settlement in the parish was the village of Bradley Green.

== History ==
Bradley was formerly a township in the parish of Malpas, in 1866 Bradley became a separate civil parish, on 1 April 2015 the parish was abolished to form "Tushingham cum Grindley, Macefen and Bradley" part of its area was transferred to Malpas parish. From 1974 to 2009 it was in Chester non-metropolitan district.

== See also ==
- Listed buildings in Bradley, Cheshire
