= Overton, Malpas =

Former civil parish in Cheshire, England

Coordinates: 53.02851°N 2.78572°W

Overton
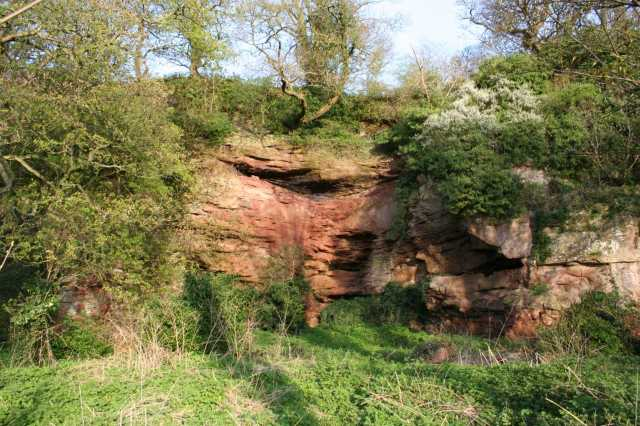
- Overton Scar

- Location within Cheshire
- Population: 68 (2001)
- OS grid reference: SJ4749
- Civil parish: Malpas
- Unitary authority: Cheshire West and Chester
- Ceremonial county: Cheshire
- Region: North West
- Country: England
- Sovereign state: United Kingdom
- Post town: MALPAS
- Postcode district: SY14
- Dialling code: 01948
- Police: Cheshire
- Fire: Cheshire
- Ambulance: North West
- UK Parliament: Chester South and Eddisbury

Overton is a former civil parish, now in the parish of Malpas, in the Cheshire West and Chester district and ceremonial county of Cheshire in England. In 2001 it had a population of 68. Overton was formerly a township in the parish of Malpas, in 1866 Overton became a separate civil parish, on 1 April 2015 the parish was abolished and merged with Malpas. It is the site of a deserted village, a scheduled monument, the sole remains of which are earthworks.

== See also ==
- Listed buildings in Overton, Malpas
- Overton Hall
