= Tybroughton =

Former Welsh civil parish

Coordinates: 52°58′30″N 2°47′28″W

Tybroughton, also spelled as Ty Broughton, is a former civil parish, in the Maelor Saesneg area of north-east Wales, historically in Flintshire and now in Wrexham County Borough. The rather isolated rural area contains no nucleated villages, although there are a few small hamlets such as Eglwys Cross.

The name is still used for an electoral ward of the community of Bronington.

== History ==
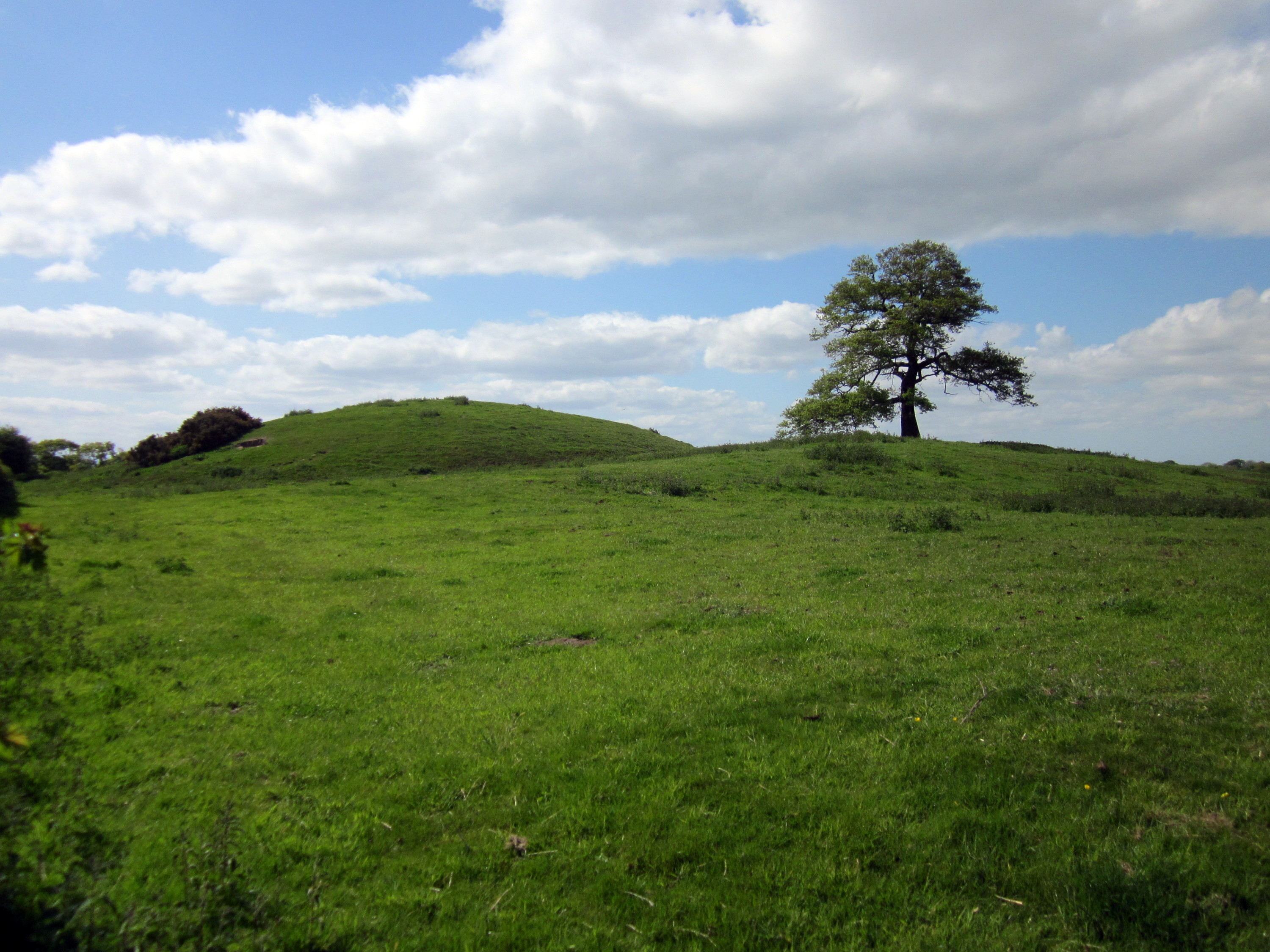
Motte at Eglwys Cross, Tybroughton.

Tybroughton was anciently a township (an administrative subdivision) of the parish of Hanmer: D. R. Thomas speculated that it was identifiable with the lost manor of 'Burwardestone' mentioned in the Domesday Book. The Wrexham historian Alfred Neobard Palmer said that the Welsh language place name Tybroughton was recorded as early as 1405 "and can only mean 'Broughton's House' ", although a mixed Old English and Welsh derivation, "house in the estate (tun) by the brook (broc)" is possible. Writing in the 1950s, placename scholar Ellis Davis claimed that the element Ty was then pronounced "tie" locally.

Tybroughton was recorded in 1699 by the antiquary Edward Lhuyd, who pointed out an "artificial mount" there called 'Mount Cop' or Eglwys y Groes, probably a motte. The main landowning family of Tybroughton for many years was called Eddowes, Eddow or Eddowe; they traced descent from a Powysian noble, Tudor Trevor.

Writing in 1840 the topographer Samuel Lewis said the township had a population of 218. It was defined as a separate civil parish by the Local Government Act 1894, but was one of the civil parishes incorporated into the community of Bronington, part of the new county of Clwyd, under the terms of the Local Government Act 1972.

== Buildings ==
Tybroughton Hall is a grade II listed house of the late 18th century.
