= Edge, Cheshire =

Former civil parish in Cheshire, England

Coordinates: 53.042°N 2.772°W

Edge
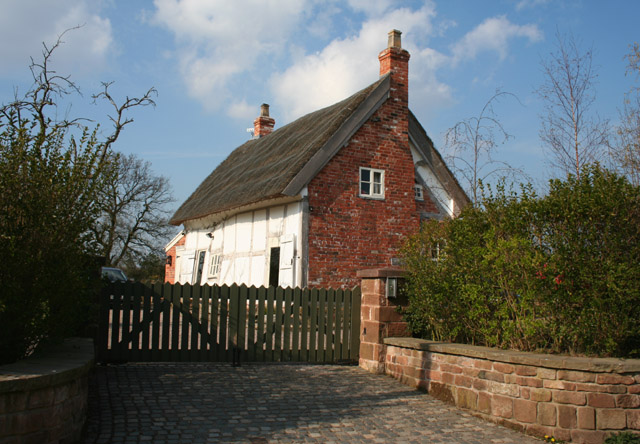
- Brassey's Contract Cottage, Edge

- Location within Cheshire
- OS grid reference: SJ483496
- Civil parish: No Man's Heath and District; Malpas
- Unitary authority: Cheshire West and Chester
- Ceremonial county: Cheshire
- Region: North West
- Country: England
- Sovereign state: United Kingdom
- Post town: MALPAS
- Postcode district: SY14
- Dialling code: 01948
- Police: Cheshire
- Fire: Cheshire
- Ambulance: North West
- UK Parliament: Chester South and Eddisbury

Edge is a former civil parish, now in the parishes of No Man's Heath and District and Malpas, in the Cheshire West and Chester district, in the ceremonial county of Cheshire, England, The parish included Edge Hall and Edge Green. The population at the 2011 census was 247. Edge was formerly a township in the parish of Malpas, in 1866 Edge became a separate civil parish, on 1 April 2015 the parish was abolished to form "No Man's Heath and District", part of it also went to Malpas.

== See also ==
- Listed buildings in Edge, Cheshire
