= Chidlow, Cheshire =

Civil parish in Cheshire, England

Chidlow
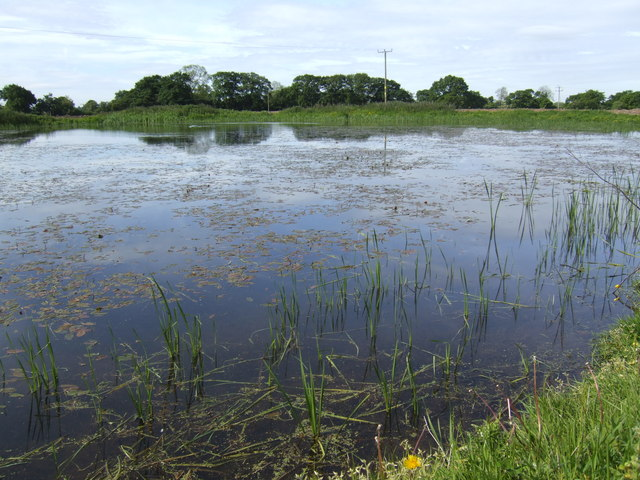
- Pond at Hill Top Farm

- Location within Cheshire
- Population: 8 (2001)
- OS grid reference: SJ5044
- Civil parish: Chidlow
- Unitary authority: Cheshire West and Chester
- Ceremonial county: Cheshire
- Region: North West
- Country: England
- Sovereign state: United Kingdom
- Post town: MALPAS
- Postcode district: SY14
- Police: Cheshire
- Fire: Cheshire
- Ambulance: North West
- UK Parliament: Chester South and Eddisbury

Chidlow is a civil parish in the Cheshire West and Chester district and ceremonial county of Cheshire in England. In 2001 it had a population of 8.

Its name is thought to be derived from the Old English personal name Cidda, meaning Cidda's hlaw or burial mound. The name first appears in records in 1282 as "Chiddelowe". Chidlow was a township and chapelry of the old parish of Malpas, and became a civil parish in 1866.

Chidlow was also a manor under the manorial system. It was anciently held by the Stranges of Blackmere, and eventually passed to the Egerton family of Oulton, who sold it in the early 19th century.

== Listed building ==
The parish contains one structure designated by English Heritage as a Grade II listed building. This is a guidepost situated at the junction of Old Malpas Road (B5395 road) and Dodd's Lane (53.00184°N 2.73530°W).

== Alternative spellings ==
Historic parish registers, wills, and maps often contain alternate spellings of Chidlow, including Chiddelowe, Chidloe, Chidlo, Chodloe and Chidlew.
