= Wigland =

Civil parish in Cheshire, England

Coordinates: 52.995°N 2.754°W

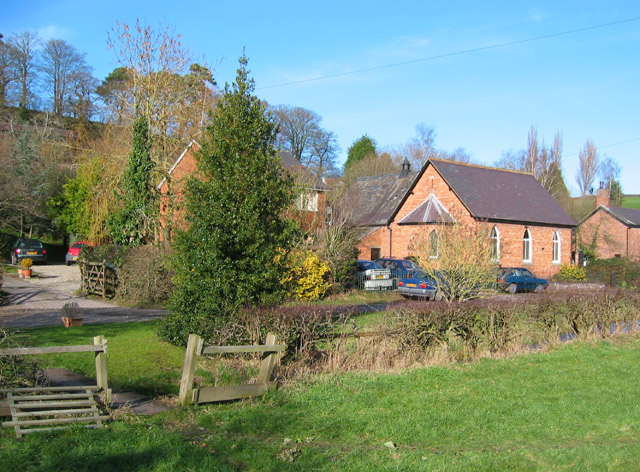
- Higher Wych Methodist Church

- Location within Cheshire
- Population: 182 (2011, also including Agden, Chidlow, Stockton and Wychough parishes)
- OS grid reference: SJ4943
- Civil parish: Wigland
- Unitary authority: Cheshire West and Chester
- Ceremonial county: Cheshire
- Region: North West
- Country: England
- Sovereign state: United Kingdom
- Post town: MALPAS
- Postcode district: SY14
- Dialling code: 01948
- Police: Cheshire
- Fire: Cheshire
- Ambulance: North West
- UK Parliament: Chester South and Eddisbury

Wigland is a civil parish in the Borough of Cheshire West and Chester and ceremonial county of Cheshire in England. It, along with the neighbouring parishes of Agden, Chidlow, Stockton and Wychough, has a population of 182 (2011 Census). The population (for the parish by itself) recorded in the 2001 Census was 104.

== See also ==
- Listed buildings in Wigland
