= Wychough =

Former civil parish in Cheshire, England

Coordinates: 53.004°N 2.772°W

Wychough: Wichalgh
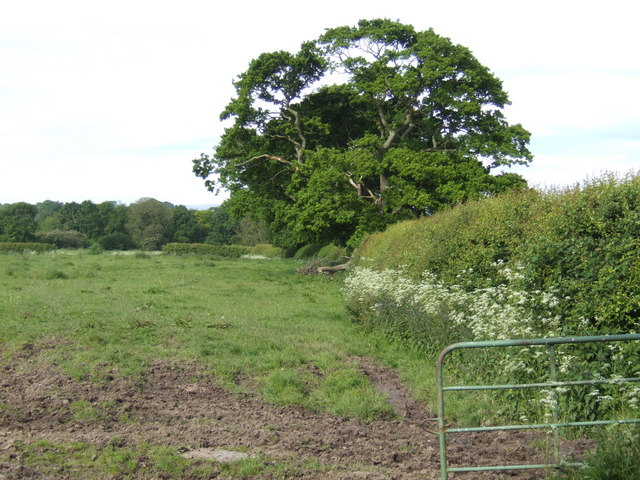
- Fields south of Manor Farm

- Location within Cheshire
- Population: 11 (2001)
- OS grid reference: SJ4845
- Civil parish: Malpas
- Unitary authority: Cheshire West and Chester
- Ceremonial county: Cheshire
- Region: North West
- Country: England
- Sovereign state: United Kingdom
- Post town: MALPAS
- Postcode district: SY14
- Dialling code: 01948
- Police: Cheshire
- Fire: Cheshire
- Ambulance: North West
- UK Parliament: Chester South and Eddisbury

Wychough is a former civil parish, now in the parish of Malpas, in the Cheshire West and Chester district, and ceremonial county of Cheshire in England. In 2001 it had a population of 11. Its name was also formerly spelt Wichalgh.

== Etymology ==
Like other placenames with the element wich(e) or wych(e) the name is a possibly a reference to the saline springs found within the parish at the hamlet of Lower Wych. The name was recorded in 1208 and 1347 as "Wychehalgh", with many variant spellings occurring in the following centuries.

== History ==
Although Wychough was not mentioned in the Domesday Book, it was anciently a township of Malpas parish and a manor of the barony of Malpas. In the reign of Edward III the manor was in the possession of Philip de Egerton. As an administrative area that levied a separate rate, the township of Wychough became a civil parish subsequent to the Poor Law Amendment Act 1866. On 1 April 2015 the parish was abolished and merged with Malpas.

== See also ==
- Listed buildings in Wychough
