= Threapwood =

Village in Cheshire, England

Coordinates: 53.005°N 2.833°W

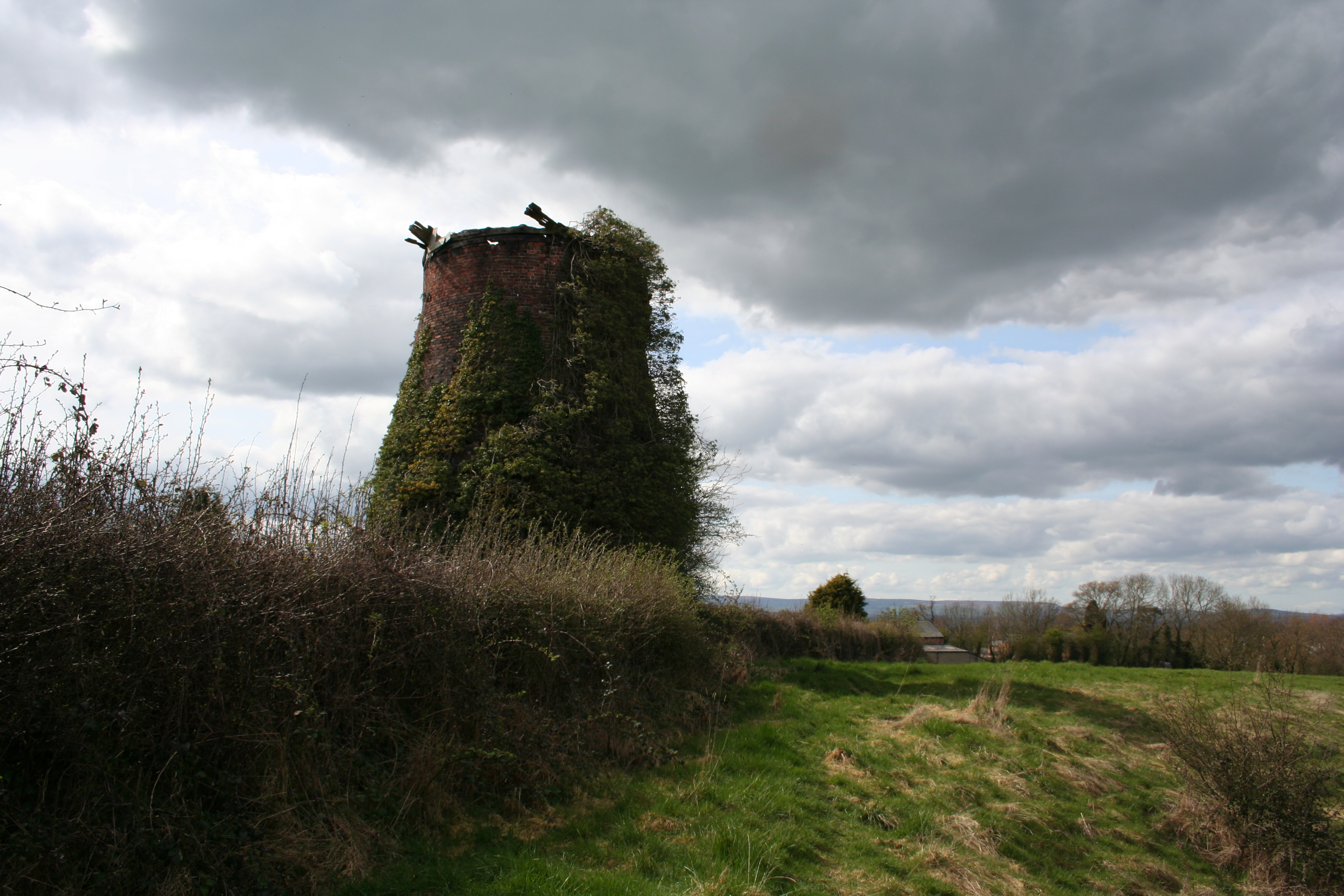
- Derelict brick tower mill at Threapwood

- Location within Cheshire
- Population: 153 (2011)
- OS grid reference: SJ440451
- Civil parish: Threapwood
- Unitary authority: Cheshire West and Chester
- Ceremonial county: Cheshire
- Region: North West
- Country: England
- Sovereign state: United Kingdom
- Post town: MALPAS
- Postcode district: SY14
- Dialling code: 01948
- Police: Cheshire
- Fire: Cheshire
- Ambulance: North West
- UK Parliament: Chester South and Eddisbury

Threapwood is a small village and civil parish in the unitary authority of Cheshire West and Chester and the ceremonial county of Cheshire, England. It is close to the villages of Shocklach, Worthenbury and Malpas.

== Toponymy and history ==
Threapwood developed on an area of common land, historically a tract of woodland lying between Cheshire and Flintshire, which was traditionally reputed to have fallen outside of county, parish and township boundaries: it was therefore outside the jurisdiction of any Justice of the Peace and paid no land tax or parish rates. This status was reflected in its name, with threap being a common Old English place name element referring to disputed boundary areas.

This vague administrative status was to lead to Threapwood gaining a reputation as a home to "abandoned characters of every description, and especially of women of loose or blemished morals". It was also a refuge for military deserters. Various attempts were made to bring Threapwood within the normal administrative structure; by the Militia Acts of 1792 it was decreed to be in Worthenbury – though for the purposes of the militia only – and the Mutiny Act 1797 placed it in the parish of Malpas.

Until Victorian times the village continued to be regarded as partly in Cheshire, and partly in Flintshire. But in 1896, under the "County of Chester (Threapwood) Order", the county boundary (and therefore the boundary between England and Wales), which passed through the village, was adjusted slightly in favour of Cheshire.

== Buildings ==
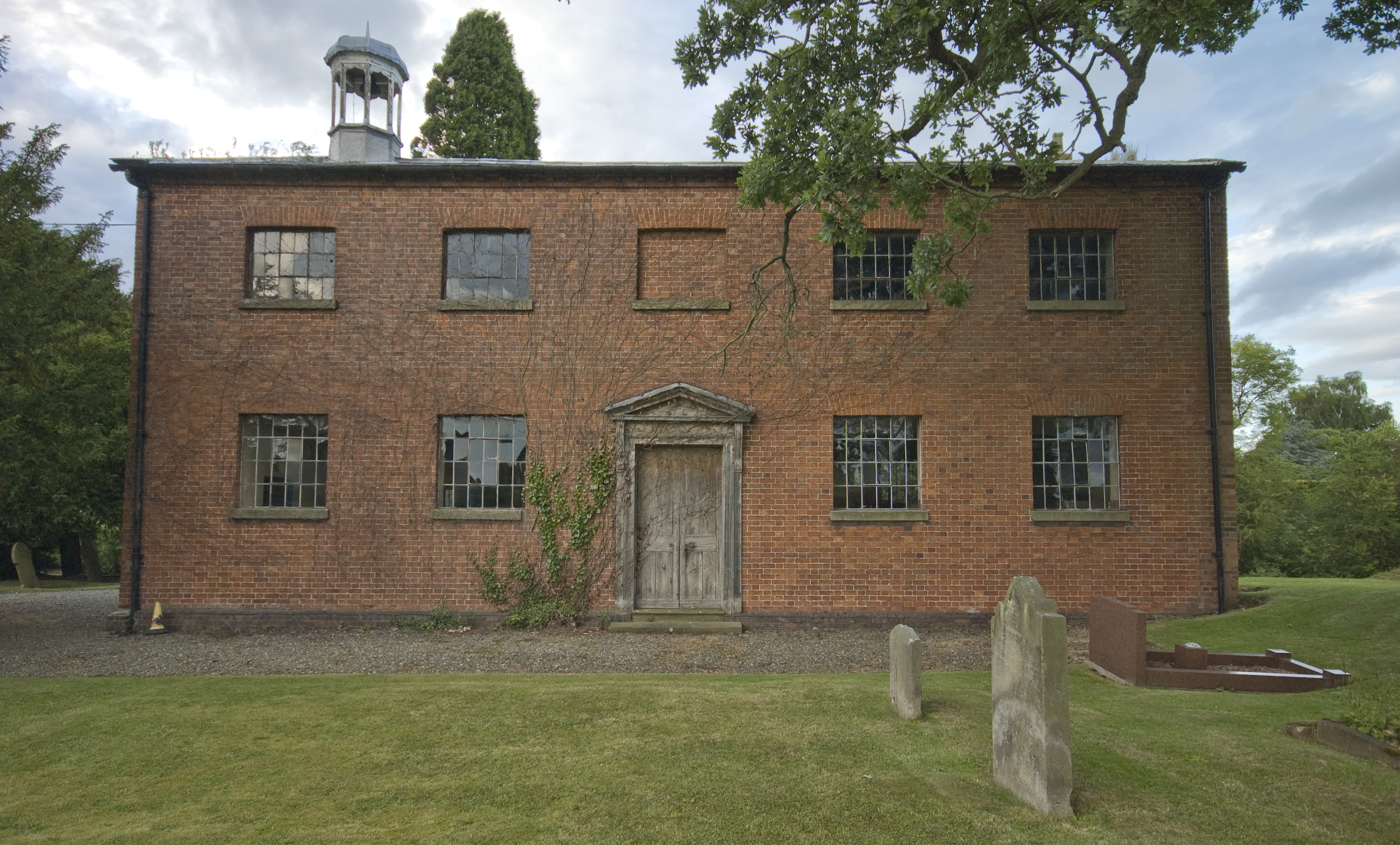
St John's Church

=== Churches ===
- St John (C of E). Founded 1817 as a chapel to Malpas (formerly extra-parochial), becoming the parish church for Threapwood in 1968.
- United Reformed Church (Independent/Congregational). Built 1850.

=== Other ===
- War Memorial
- A derelict brick tower windmill to the southeast of the village still contains much of the internal mechanism, though in a ruinous state of repair.

== See also ==
- Listed buildings in Threapwood

== Sources ==
- Vision of Britain website
- Threapwood History Group
