= Malpas, Cheshire =

Village in Cheshire, England

Coordinates: 53.019°N 2.764°W

Malpas
- Market town
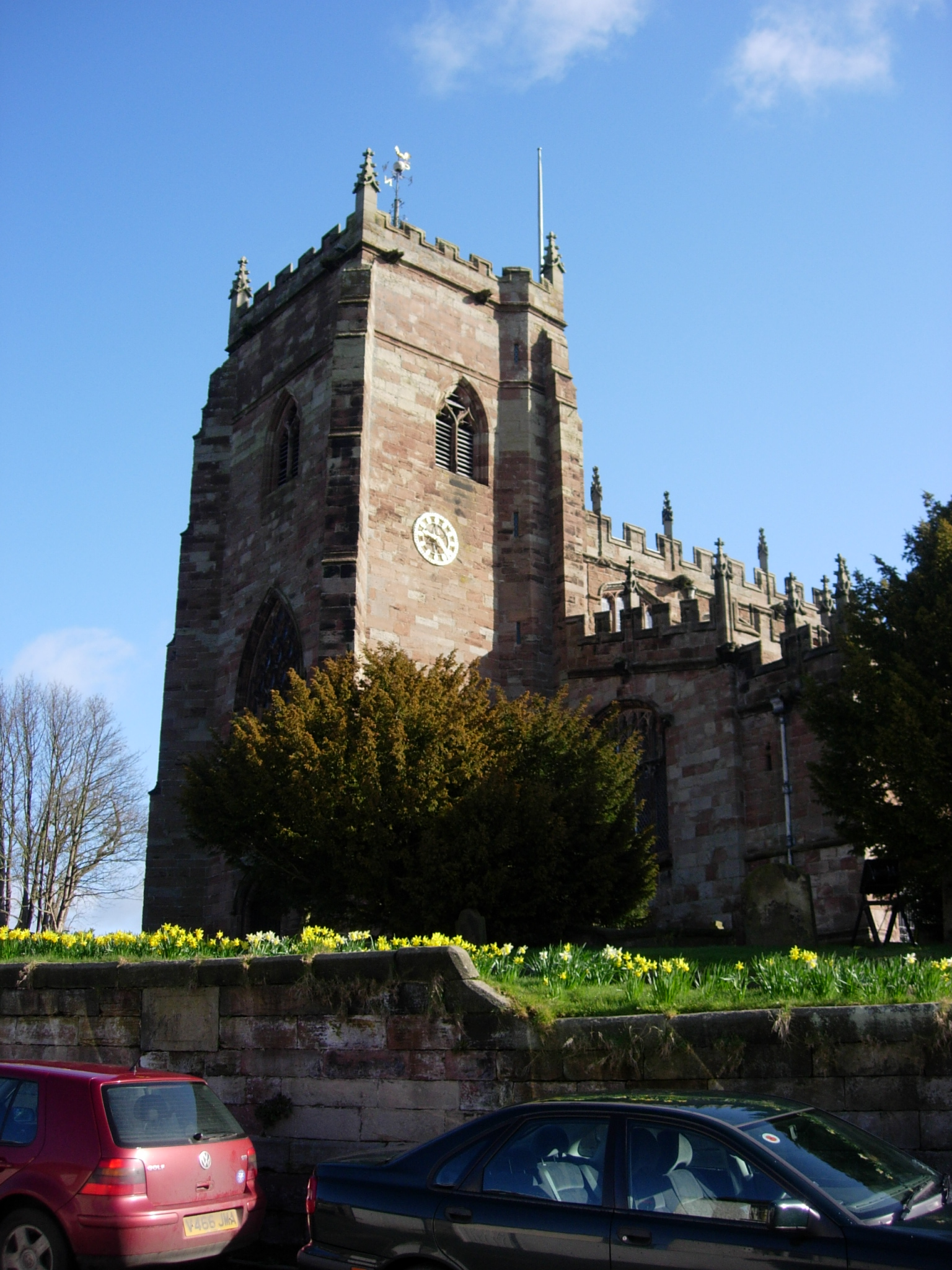
- St Oswald's Church, Malpas from the southwest

- Location within Cheshire
- Population: 1,673 (2011 census)
- OS grid reference: SJ487472
- Civil parish: Malpas
- Unitary authority: Cheshire West and Chester
- Ceremonial county: Cheshire
- Region: North West
- Country: England
- Sovereign state: United Kingdom
- Post town: MALPAS
- Postcode district: SY14
- Dialling code: 01948
- Police: Cheshire
- Fire: Cheshire
- Ambulance: North West
- UK Parliament: Chester South and Eddisbury

Malpas (/mælpəs/ MAL-pəs) is a market town and a civil parish in the unitary authority of Cheshire West and Chester and the ceremonial county of Cheshire, England. It lies near the borders with Shropshire and Wales, and had a population of 2,503 at the 2021 census.

== Toponymy ==
The name derives from Old French and means "bad/difficult passage".

The parish also once contained a place called Chathull, whose name is attested in 1333 as Nant Chathull. This is notable because the first element of Chathull is thought to derive from Common Brittonic, from the word surviving in modern Welsh as coed ("wood"). This word must have been a place-name in its own right which, adopted into English, then became the basis for a new place-name, Chathull, whose second element is from Old English hyll ("hill") and which therefore meant "hill at Chat". During a later period when English became less widely spoken in Cheshire, in favour of Welsh, the Welsh word nant ("stream") was then further added to the name.

== History ==
=== Medieval (Norman 1066–1154) ===
After the Norman Conquest of 1066, Malpas is recorded in the Domesday Book of 1086 as belonging to Robert FitzHugh, baron of Malpas. Malpas and other holdings were given to his family for defensive services along the Welsh border.

A concentrated line of castles protected Cheshire's western border from the Welsh; these included motte-and-bailey castles at Shotwick, Dodleston, Aldford, Pulford, Shocklach, Oldcastle and Malpas. The earthworks of Malpas Castle are still to be found to the north of St. Oswald's Church.

=== Medieval (Plantagenet 1154–1485) ===
Malpas retains its general layout established in the medieval period. Malpas was granted a Market Charter for a weekly market and annual fair in 1281, thus making it an official "Market Town".

=== Tudor – Elizabethan (1485–1603) ===
The sixth son of Sir Randolph Brereton of Shocklach and Malpas, Sir William Brereton, became chamberlain of Chester, and groom of the chamber to Henry VIII. He was beheaded on 17 May 1536 for a suspected romantic affair with Anne Boleyn. These accusations may have been politically motivated.

== Transport ==
Malpas was once served by a station on the Whitchurch and Tattenhall Railway.

The B5069 road passes through the town from the England/Wales border, towards the A41 road near Hampton Heath. The B5395 road diverges from the A41 at Grindley Brook and heads towards Malpas.

== Demography ==
Population of Malpas since 1801
Year	1801	1851	1901	1951	2001	2011	2021
Population	906	1,054	1,139	1,219	1,628	1,673	2,503

According to the 2011 census, the civil parish had 1,673 residents living in 770 households. This increased in the 2021 census to 2,503 residents, composed of 1,178 (47.1%) males and 1,325 (52.9%) females, in 1,084 households.

== Governance ==
Malpas was formerly a township and ancient parish within Broxton Hundred, which became a civil parish in 1866. It has had a parish council since their formation in 1894. Prior to that, Malpas had been administered through Vestry Meetings held in St Oswald's Church. Between 1894 and 1936 the town had its own rural district council. Under a Cheshire County review order in 1936, the boundaries of several rural districts were adjusted. Malpas Rural District was abolished and most of the area absorbed into Tarvin Rural District. On 1 April 1974, this was merged into Chester District. Further changes occurred on 1 April 2009 when the Cheshire West & Chester unitary authority was formed. On 1 April 2015, the Malpas Parish absorbed the surrounding parishes of Newton-by-Malpas, Overton, Stockton, Wychough, and parts of Oldcastle, while ceding land to No Man's Heath and District.

An electoral ward in the same name exists. This ward stretches north to Edge and south to Wigland. The total population of this ward taken at the 2021 census was 4,946.

Malpas is within the Chester South and Eddisbury parliamentary constituency.

== Religion ==
- Church of England, see: St Oswald's Church, Malpas
- High Street Church, an ecumenical partnership bringing together traditions of the United Reform Church and the Methodist Church.

== Media ==
Television signals are only received from the Wrekin TV transmitter which broadcast BBC West Midlands and ITV Central. However, BBC North West and ITV Granada can be received through cable and satellite television such as Freesat and Sky.

The town is covered by both BBC Radio Stoke and BBC Radio Shropshire including Heart Cheshire and North East Wales, Capital North West & Wales and Dee Radio.

The local newspapers is provided by Whitchurch Herald and Chester Chronicle.

== Education ==
- Primary school − Malpas Alport Endowed Primary School
- Secondary school − Bishop Heber High School, named after Bishop Reginald Heber

== Notable people ==
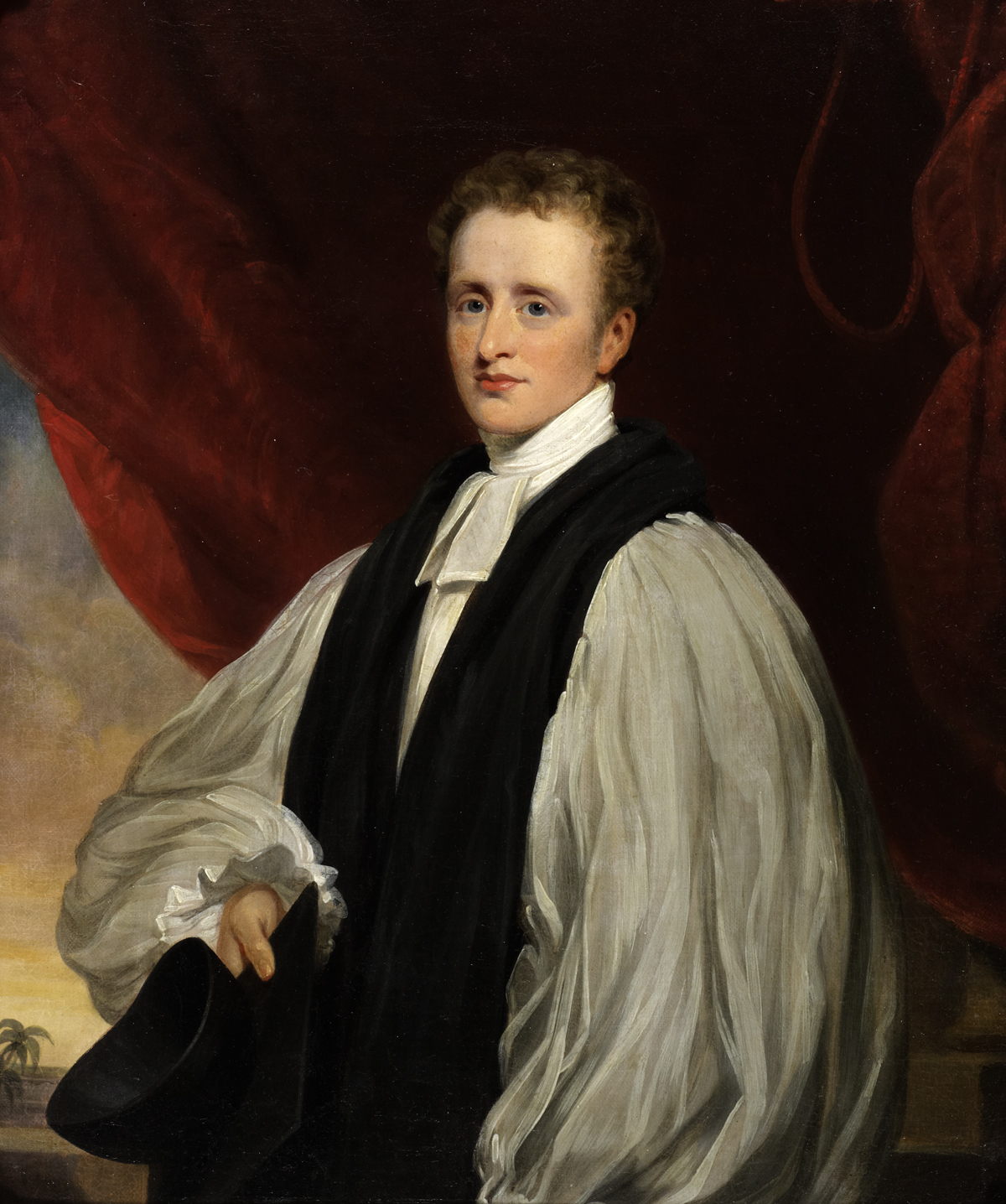
Reginald Heber, ca.1822

- John Dod (c. 1549 – 1645), known as "Decalogue Dod", a non-conforming English clergyman.
- Matthew Henry (1662–1714), Presbyterian minister and biblical commentator
- Sir John Moore, 1st Baronet, (1718–1779), Admiral (Royal Navy) during the War of the Austrian Succession.
- Ralph Churton (1754–1831), Anglican churchman, archdeacon of St David's and biographer.
- Bishop Reginald Heber (1783–1826), Bishop of Calcutta and poet.
- Anthony Harvey (1930–2017), filmmaker, resident from 1968
- Fulke Johnson Houghton (1940–2025), a thoroughbred racehorse trainer.
- Chris Michell (born 1951 in Hampton), flautist and composer of ambient-classic and New Age music
- Ian Bartholomew (born 1954), Coronation Street actor, lives in Malpas
- Mark Rylands (born 1961), Anglican Bishop of Shrewsbury 2009–18, Malpas resident 1961–1988
- Chris Stockton (born 1969), former jockey, owner of rare cattle, BTCC racing driver
