= Chester South and Eddisbury =

UK Parliament constituency (since 2024)

- County constituency for the House of Commons
- Interactive map of boundaries since 2024
- Location within North West England
- County: Cheshire
- Electorate: 71,975 (March 2020)
- Major settlements: Chester (part), Cuddington, Weaverham, Kelsall

Current constituency
- Created: 2024
- Member of Parliament: Aphra Brandreth (Conservative)
- Seats: One
- Created from: Eddisbury & City of Chester (part)

Chester South and Eddisbury is a constituency of the House of Commons in the UK Parliament. Further to the completion of the 2023 Periodic Review of Westminster constituencies, it was first contested at the 2024 general election. The Member of Parliament elected in 2024 is Aphra Brandreth of the Conservative Party. It is one of only three currently held by the Conservatives in the North West Region.

== Constituency profile ==
Chester South and Eddisbury is a large rural constituency located in Cheshire. It contains southern suburbs of the city of Chester (Handbridge, Lache and Huntington) south of the River Dee, and many small rural settlements, including the small market town of Malpas and the villages of Weaverham, Cuddington and Tarporley. The constituency's name references the traditional hundred (division) of Cheshire which was named after Eddisbury hill fort, an Iron Age settlement near the village of Delamere. The constituency is generally affluent, particularly in Christleton and Tarvin, and house prices are high.

The River Dee at Chester, which forms the boundary between this constituency and Chester North and Neston.

Compared to national averages, residents of the constituency are older, more religious and have high levels of income, education and professional employment. White people make up 96% of the population. At the local council level, the Chester suburbs are represented by Labour Party councillors whilst the rest of the constituency elected Conservatives. An estimated 52% of voters in the constituency supported remaining in the European Union in the 2016 Brexit referendum compared to 48% nationally.

== Boundaries ==
Further to the 2023 boundary review, the composition of the constituency is as follows from the 2024 general election (as they existed on 1 December 2020):

- The Borough of Cheshire East wards of: Audlem; Bunbury; Wrenbury; Wybunbury.
- The Borough of Cheshire West and Chester wards of: Christleton & Huntington; Farndon; Handbridge Park; Lache; Malpas; Tarporley; Tarvin & Kelsall; Tattenhall; Weaver & Cuddington.

The seat covers the majority of, and replaces, the former Eddisbury constituency, excluding the town of Winsford (now part of the new constituency of Mid Cheshire), together with areas of Chester to the south of the River Dee from the abolished City of Chester constituency. In addition, Weaverham was transferred from Weaver Vale (also abolished) and Wybunbury from Crewe and Nantwich.

== Members of Parliament ==
Election	Member	Party
2024	Aphra Brandreth	Conservative

== Elections ==
=== Elections in the 2020s ===
General election 2024: Chester South and Eddisbury
Party	Candidate	Votes	%	±%
Conservative	Aphra Brandreth	19,905	37.9	−21.3
Labour	Angeliki Stogia	16,848	32.1	+10.6
Reform	Peter Langley	6,414	12.2	+11.2
Liberal Democrats	Rob Herd	5,430	10.3	−5.0
Green	Steve Davies	2,278	4.3	+2.2
Independent	Gillian Edwards	1,611	3.1	N/A
Majority		3,057	5.8	−31.9
Turnout		52,486	70.7	–6.0
Registered electors		74,284		
Conservative hold		Swing	−15.9	

2019 notional result
Party	Vote	%
Conservative	32,703	59.2
Labour	11,877	21.5
Liberal Democrats	8,446	15.3
Green	1,163	2.1
Brexit Party	569	1.0
Others	451	0.8
Turnout	55,209	76.7
Electorate	71,975	
