= 1984 Chester City Council election =

1984 English local election

← 1983	3 May 1984	1986 →

22 out of 60 seats to Chester City Council 31 seats needed for a majority
- Turnout: 44.3% (▼3.2%)

	First party	Second party
Party	Conservative	Labour
Last election	37 seats, 42.8%	14 seats, 28.4%
Seats won	10	9
Seats after	34	16
Seat change	▼3	▲2
Popular vote	14,036	13,020
Percentage	40.1%	37.2%
Swing	▼2.7%	▲8.8%
	Third party	Fourth party
Party	Alliance	Independent
Last election	8 seats, 25.7%	1 seat, 2.7%
Seats won	3	0
Seats after	9	1
Seat change	▲1	0
Popular vote	7,840	111
Percentage	22.4%	0.3%
Swing	▼3.3%	▼2.4%
- Winner of each seat at the 1984 Chester City Council election
Council control before election
Conservative
Council control after election
Conservative

The 1984 Chester City Council election took place on 3 May 1984 to elect members of Chester City Council in Cheshire, England. This was on the same day as other local elections.

== Summary ==
=== Election result ===
1984 Chester City Council election
Party	This election			Full council			This election		
Party	Seats	Net	Seats %	Other	Total	Total %	Votes	Votes %	+/−
Conservative	10	▼3	45.5	24	34	56.7	14,036	40.1	–2.7
Labour	9	▲2	40.9	7	16	26.7	13,020	37.2	+8.8
Alliance	3	▲1	13.6	6	9	15.0	7,840	22.4	–3.3
Independent	0	0	0.0	1	1	1.7	111	0.3	–2.4

== Ward results ==
=== Blacon Hall ===
Blacon Hall
Party	Candidate	Votes	%	±%
Labour	J. Vernon	1,180	78.4	±0.0
Conservative	A. Needham	203	13.5	–0.5
Alliance	J. Norton	123	8.2	+0.7
Majority		977	64.9	+0.5
Turnout		1,506	34.9	–5.5
Registered electors		4,314		
Labour hold		Swing	▲0.3	

=== Boughton ===
Boughton
Party	Candidate	Votes	%	±%
Labour	D. Robinson	697	46.3	+11.6
Conservative	E. Forster*	589	39.1	–4.7
Alliance	P. Atkinson	221	14.7	–6.9
Majority		108	7.2	N/A
Turnout		1,507	58.9	+11.7
Registered electors		2,556		
Labour gain from Conservative		Swing	▲8.2	

=== Christleton ===
Christleton
Party	Candidate	Votes	%	±%
Conservative	B. Bailey	1,028	65.8	–5.1
Labour	A. Murphy	270	17.3	+8.0
Alliance	R. Hesketh	265	17.0	–2.9
Majority		758	48.5	–2.5
Turnout		1,563	42.1	–5.0
Registered electors		3,713		
Conservative hold		Swing	▼6.6	

=== College ===
College
Party	Candidate	Votes	%	±%
Labour	C. Russell*	1,057	55.5	+3.5
Conservative	H. Middleton	573	30.1	–2.5
Alliance	S. Howells	165	8.7	–1.0
Independent	D. Taylor	111	5.8	+0.2
Majority		484	25.4	+6.0
Turnout		1,906	42.9	–1.5
Registered electors		4,439		
Labour hold		Swing	▲3.0	

=== Curzon ===
Curzon
Party	Candidate	Votes	%	±%
Conservative	C. Elmerl*	811	52.8	+4.4
Labour	R. Annand	507	33.0	+9.4
Alliance	S. Mole	218	14.2	–13.8
Majority		304	19.8	–0.6
Turnout		1,536	48.6	+0.1
Registered electors		3,158		
Conservative hold		Swing	▼2.5	

=== Dee Point ===
Dee Point
Party	Candidate	Votes	%
Labour	C. Jones	1,215	78.6
Labour	M. Nelson	1,187	76.8
Conservative	E. Astill	417	27.0
Alliance	G. Wilson	275	17.8
Turnout		1,545	31.3
Registered electors		4,937	
Labour hold			
Labour hold			

=== Farndon ===
Farndon
Party	Candidate	Votes	%	±%
Conservative	S. Lloyd*	526	81.9	–2.8
Labour	W. Mordue	116	18.1	+2.8
Majority		410	63.9	–5.6
Turnout		642	39.5	±0.0
Registered electors		1,626		
Conservative hold		Swing	▼2.8	

=== Grosvenor ===
Grosvenor
Party	Candidate	Votes	%	±%
Conservative	F. Hignett*	976	47.1	–0.6
Labour	J. Poynton	651	31.4	+2.1
Alliance	R. Playford	444	21.4	–1.6
Majority		325	15.7	–2.7
Turnout		2,071	47.5	–4.9
Registered electors		4,363		
Conservative hold		Swing	▼1.4	

=== Hoole ===
Hoole
Party	Candidate	Votes	%	±%
Alliance	R. Stunell*	1,166	51.1	+0.8
Labour	W. Crampton	762	33.4	+3.1
Conservative	A. Edwards	352	15.4	–4.1
Majority		404	17.7	–2.3
Turnout		2,280	50.0	–4.2
Registered electors		4,556		
Alliance hold		Swing	▼1.2	

=== Malpas ===
Malpas
Party	Candidate	Votes	%	±%
Conservative	B. Hassall*	912	60.8	–0.1
Alliance	C. Higgie	317	21.1	+3.6
Labour	E. Glendon	272	18.1	–3.5
Majority		595	39.6	–5.7
Turnout		1,501	51.7	+6.4
Registered electors		2,905		
Conservative hold		Swing	▼1.9	

=== Newton ===
Newton
Party	Candidate	Votes	%	±%
Conservative	J. Ebo*	1,011	60.1	+6.8
Labour	S. Simpson	338	20.1	+3.5
Alliance	M. Payne	334	19.8	+4.0
Majority		673	40.0	+3.3
Turnout		1,683	40.2	–3.9
Registered electors		4,189		
Conservative hold		Swing	▲1.7	

=== Plas Newton ===
Plas Newton
Party	Candidate	Votes	%	±%
Labour	H. Jones	869	45.3	+0.4
Conservative	K. Noon	761	39.6	+1.4
Alliance	J. Evans	290	15.1	–1.9
Majority		108	5.6	–1.1
Turnout		1,920	48.1	–1.5
Registered electors		3,989		
Labour hold		Swing	▼0.5	

=== Saughall ===
Saughall
Party	Candidate	Votes	%	±%
Alliance	B. Kerr*	932	69.0	+15.4
Conservative	M. Hughes	318	23.5	–14.5
Labour	G. Cairns	101	7.5	–0.9
Majority		614	45.4	+29.8
Turnout		1,351	45.8	–3.3
Registered electors		2,951		
Alliance hold		Swing	▲15.0	

=== Sealand ===
Sealand
Party	Candidate	Votes	%
Labour	R. Bott	875	46.1
Labour	J. Randall*	820	43.2
Conservative	A. Watkin	557	29.4
Conservative	A. Holmes	468	24.7
Alliance	L. Hollins	466	24.6
Alliance	D. Howells	279	14.7
Turnout		1,897	48.5
Registered electors		3,911	
Labour gain from Conservative			
Labour hold			

=== Tattenhall ===
Tattenhall
Party	Candidate	Votes	%	±%
Conservative	F. Pierce*	557	81.9	+47.0
Labour	R. Walsh	123	18.1	+9.7
Majority		434	63.8	N/A
Turnout		680	27.1	–22.7
Registered electors		2,510		
Conservative hold		Swing	▲18.7	

=== Upton Grange ===
Upton Grange
Party	Candidate	Votes	%	±%
Conservative	J. Butler*	689	50.4	–12.2
Alliance	D. Evans	516	37.7	+14.0
Labour	S. Taylor	163	11.9	–1.8
Majority		173	12.6	–26.3
Turnout		1,368	47.3	+8.9
Registered electors		2,891		
Conservative hold		Swing	▼13.1	

=== Upton Heath ===
Upton Heath
Party	Candidate	Votes	%	±%
Labour	R. Griffiths*	1,016	46.1	+11.5
Conservative	B. Roberts	876	39.8	–4.9
Alliance	P. Lowry	310	14.1	–6.6
Majority		140	6.4	N/A
Turnout		2,202	49.7	–1.5
Registered electors		4,428		
Labour hold		Swing	▲8.2	

=== Vicars Cross ===
Vicars Cross
Party	Candidate	Votes	%	±%
Alliance	K. Holding	1,036	51.5	–11.9
Conservative	E. Woodbine	662	32.9	+7.7
Labour	C. Warwood	314	15.6	+4.2
Majority		374	18.6	–19.5
Turnout		2,226	46.0	–3.0
Registered electors		4,373		
Alliance gain from Conservative		Swing	▼9.8	

=== Waverton ===
Waverton
Party	Candidate	Votes	%	±%
Conservative	J. Bramall*	408	57.5	–0.2
Alliance	C. Walley	242	34.1	N/A
Labour	A. Pegrum	59	8.3	+1.4
Majority		166	23.4	+1.1
Turnout		709	50.7	–9.2
Registered electors		1,399		
Conservative hold				

=== Wetsminster ===
Westminster
Party	Candidate	Votes	%	±%
Conservative	R. Short*	1,128	62.8	+6.5
Labour	E. Champion	428	23.8	–3.8
Alliance	L. Lacey	239	13.3	–2.8
Majority		700	39.0	+10.3
Turnout		1,795	37.6	–5.5
Registered electors		4,775		
Conservative hold		Swing	▲5.2	
