= 1983 Chester City Council election =

1983 English local election

← 1982	5 May 1983	1984 →

20 out of 60 seats to Chester City Council 31 seats needed for a majority
- Turnout: 47.5% (▲3.1%)

	First party	Second party	Third party
Party	Conservative	Labour	Alliance
Last election	37 seats, 43.5%	14 seats, 26.0%	8 seats, 30.3%
Seats won	10	5	4
Seats after	37	14	8
Seat change	0	0	▲2
Popular vote	15,268	10,147	9,184
Percentage	42.8%	28.4%	25.7%
Swing	▼0.7%	▲2.4%	▼4.6%
	Fourth party	Fifth party
Party	Independent	Residents
Last election	1 seat, 0.0%	2 seats, 0.3%
Seats won	1	0
Seats after	1	0
Seat change	0	▼2
Popular vote	966	109
Percentage	2.7%	0.3%
Swing	N/A	0.0%
- Winner of each seat at the 1983 Chester City Council election
Council control before election
Conservative
Council control after election
Conservative

The 1983 Chester City Council election took place on 5 May 1983 to elect members of Chester City Council in Cheshire, England. This was on the same day as other local elections.

== Summary ==
=== Election result ===
1983 Chester City Council election
Party	This election			Full council			This election		
Party	Seats	Net	Seats %	Other	Total	Total %	Votes	Votes %	+/−
Conservative	10	0	50.0	27	37	61.7	15,268	42.8	–0.7
Labour	5	0	25.0	9	14	23.3	10,147	28.4	+2.4
Alliance	4	▲2	20.0	4	8	13.3	9,184	25.7	–4.6
Independent	1	0	5.0	0	1	1.7	966	2.7	N/A
Residents	0	▼2	0.0	0	0	0.0	109	0.3	±0.0

== Ward results ==
=== Barrow ===
Barrow
Party	Candidate	Votes	%	±%
Conservative	W. Mapes	897	62.6	+6.4
Alliance	W. Moore	364	25.4	–10.2
Labour	R. Barlow	172	12.0	+3.8
Majority		533	37.2	+16.6
Turnout		1,433	45.0	+4.4
Registered electors		3,184		
Conservative hold		Swing	▲8.3	

=== Blacon Hill ===
Blacon Hill
Party	Candidate	Votes	%	±%
Labour	L. Price	1,354	78.4	+12.8
Conservative	A. Davies	242	14.0	–1.9
Alliance	J. Indemaur	130	7.5	–11.0
Majority		1,112	64.4	N/A
Turnout		1,726	40.4	+5.2
Registered electors		4,274		
Labour hold		Swing	▲7.4	

=== Boughton Heath ===
Boughton Heath
Party	Candidate	Votes	%	±%
Alliance	A. Farrell	943	49.8	+7.9
Conservative	M. Chambers	767	40.5	–7.2
Labour	S. Phillips	184	9.7	–0.7
Majority		176	9.3	N/A
Turnout		1,894	57.7	–0.3
Registered electors		3,280		
Alliance gain from Conservative		Swing	▲7.6	

=== Christieton ===
Christieton
Party	Candidate	Votes	%	±%
Conservative	J. Blake*	1,217	70.9	+12.5
Alliance	S. Armstrong	341	19.9	N/A
Labour	R. Walsh	159	9.3	–4.3
Majority		876	51.0	+20.6
Turnout		1,717	47.1	+7.4
Registered electors		3,645		
Conservative hold				

=== College ===
College
Party	Candidate	Votes	%	±%
Labour	J. Crawford*	1,006	52.0	+13.9
Conservative	H. Middleton	631	32.6	–3.0
Alliance	R. Barritt	188	9.7	–11.0
Residents	D. Taylor	109	5.6	–0.1
Majority		375	19.4	+16.9
Turnout		1,934	44.4	+3.1
Registered electors		4,354		
Labour hold		Swing	▲8.5	

=== Dee Point ===
Dee Point
Party	Candidate	Votes	%	±%
Labour	D. Southall	1,268	66.0	+5.8
Conservative	J. Price	440	22.9	+2.8
Alliance	D. Howells	213	11.1	–8.6
Majority		828	43.1	+3.0
Turnout		1,921	39.2	+4.5
Registered electors		4,902		
Labour hold		Swing	▲1.5	

=== Dodleston ===
Dodleston
Party	Candidate	Votes	%	±%
Conservative	W. Fair*	636	78.5	N/A
Alliance	D. Simpson	97	12.0	N/A
Labour	R. McBride	77	9.5	N/A
Majority		539	66.5	N/A
Turnout		810	57.1	N/A
Registered electors		1,418		
Conservative hold				

=== Elton ===
Elton
Party	Candidate	Votes	%	±%
Conservative	K. Peate*	1,043	56.7	+10.3
Alliance	R. McLure	590	32.1	–12.3
Labour	J. Champion	206	11.2	+2.1
Majority		453	24.6	+22.6
Turnout		1,839	44.3	–2.1
Registered electors		4,152		
Conservative hold		Swing	▲11.3	

=== Grosvenor ===
Grosvenor
Party	Candidate	Votes	%	±%
Conservative	M. Byatt*	1,075	47.7	–3.2
Labour	J. Poynton	661	29.3	+5.2
Alliance	H. Fearnall	519	23.0	–2.0
Majority		414	18.4	–7.5
Turnout		2,255	52.4	+5.3
Registered electors		4,301		
Conservative hold		Swing	▼4.2	

=== Hoole ===
Hoole
Party	Candidate	Votes	%	±%
Alliance	J. Smith*	1,239	50.3	+1.0
Labour	W. Crompton	746	30.3	+1.9
Conservative	K. Jones	480	19.5	–2.8
Majority		493	20.0	–0.9
Turnout		2,465	54.2	+9.3
Registered electors		4,547		
Alliance hold		Swing	▼0.5	

=== Malpas ===
Malpas
Party	Candidate	Votes	%	±%
Conservative	F. Craddock*	788	60.9	–10.5
Labour	J. Edgar	279	21.6	–7.0
Alliance	E. Walley	226	17.5	N/A
Majority		509	39.4	–3.4
Turnout		1,293	45.3	+4.6
Registered electors		2,857		
Conservative hold		Swing	▼1.8	

=== Newton ===
Newton
Party	Candidate	Votes	%	±%
Conservative	J. Hibbert	981	53.3	–2.8
Labour	J. Holland	306	16.6	+4.3
Alliance	L. Irvine	290	15.8	–15.8
Independent	F. Carson*	263	14.3	N/A
Majority		675	36.7	N/A
Turnout		1,840	44.1	–3.8
Registered electors		4,173		
Conservative gain from Residents		Swing	▼3.6	

=== Plas Newton ===
Plas Newton
Party	Candidate	Votes	%	±%
Labour	J. Arrowsmith*	888	44.9	+15.5
Conservative	K. Noon	755	38.2	–5.8
Alliance	S. Howells	336	17.0	–11.7
Majority		133	6.7	N/A
Turnout		1,979	49.6	+4.9
Registered electors		3,992		
Labour hold		Swing	▲10.7	

=== Saughall ===
Saughall
Party	Candidate	Votes	%	±%
Alliance	D. Whitton*	776	53.6	–15.8
Conservative	E. Cooke	550	38.0	+14.7
Labour	G. Cairns	122	8.4	+1.1
Majority		226	15.6	–30.5
Turnout		1,448	49.1	+2.1
Registered electors		2,947		
Alliance hold		Swing	▼15.3	

=== Sealand ===
Sealand
Party	Candidate	Votes	%	±%
Labour	D. Nield	873	42.7	+8.9
Conservative	J. Jones	622	30.4	–7.1
Alliance	L. Hollins	551	26.9	–1.8
Majority		251	12.3	N/A
Turnout		2,046	52.4	+5.6
Registered electors		3,905		
Labour hold		Swing	▲8.0	

=== Tarvin ===
Tarvin
Party	Candidate	Votes	%	±%
Conservative	D. Cotgreave*	1,010	72.6	+7.2
Alliance	J. Trowell	231	16.6	–3.5
Labour	A. Pegrum	150	10.8	–3.7
Majority		779	56.0	+10.7
Turnout		1,391	44.9	–2.7
Registered electors		3,096		
Conservative hold		Swing	▲5.4	

=== Tattenhall ===
Tattenhall
Party	Candidate	Votes	%	±%
Independent	D. Haynes*	703	56.7	N/A
Conservative	B. Bird	433	34.9	–13.5
Labour	M. McDowell	104	8.4	–7.4
Majority		270	21.8	N/A
Turnout		1,240	49.8	+16.0
Registered electors		2,488		
Independent hold				

=== Upton Heath ===
Upton Heath
Party	Candidate	Votes	%	±%
Conservative	J. Houlbrook*	1,012	44.7	+0.6
Labour	H. Jones	784	34.6	+5.1
Alliance	P. Lowery	470	20.7	–5.7
Majority		228	10.1	N/A
Turnout		2,266	51.2	+2.1
Registered electors		4,427		
Conservative hold		Swing	▼2.9	

=== Vicars Cross ===
Vicars Cross
Party	Candidate	Votes	%	±%
Alliance	S. Proctor	1,352	63.4	+3.5
Conservative	A. Jones	538	25.2	–6.0
Labour	C. Warwood	244	11.4	+2.5
Majority		814	38.1	+9.3
Turnout		2,134	49.0	+2.9
Registered electors		4,355		
Alliance gain from Residents		Swing	▲4.8	

=== Westminster ===
Westminster
Party	Candidate	Votes	%	±%
Conservative	P. White	1,151	56.3	+4.7
Labour	R. Champion	564	27.6	+3.3
Alliance	S. Fraser	328	16.1	–8.0
Majority		587	28.7	+1.5
Turnout		2,043	43.1	+2.4
Registered electors		4,741		
Conservative hold		Swing	▲0.7	
