= 1991 Chester City Council election =

1991 English local election

| ← 1990 | 2 May 1991 | 1992 → |

21 out of 60 seats to Chester City Council 31 seats needed for a majority

| | First party | Second party |
|---|---|---|
| Party | Conservative | Labour |
| Last election | 24 seats, 29.8% | 22 seats, 48.3% |
| Seats won | 10 | 4 |
| Seats after | 24 | 21 |
| Seat change | Steady | ▼1 |
| Popular vote | 15,225 | 14,282 |
| Percentage | 36.9% | 34.6% |
| Swing | ▲7.1% | ▼13.7% |
| | Third party | Fourth party |
| Party | Liberal Democrats | Independent |
| Last election | 13 seats, 20.9% | 1 seat, 0.3% |
| Seats won | 6 | 1 |
| Seats after | 14 | 1 |
| Seat change | ▲1 | Steady |
| Popular vote | 9,893 | 1,613 |
| Percentage | 24.0% | 3.9% |
| Swing | ▲3.9% | ▲3.6% |
- Winner of each seat at the 1991 Chester City Council election
Council control before election
No overall control
Council control after election
No overall control

The 1991 Chester City Council election took place on 2 May 1991 to elect members of Chester City Council in Cheshire, England. This was on the same day as other local elections.

== Summary ==
=== Election result ===
1991 Chester City Council election
| Party | This election | | | Full council | | | This election | | |
| Party | Seats | Net | Seats % | Other | Total | Total % | Votes | Votes % | +/− |
|---|---|---|---|---|---|---|---|---|---|
| Conservative | 10 | Steady | 47.6 | 14 | 24 | 40.0 | 15,225 | 36.9 | +7.1 |
| Labour | 4 | ▼1 | 19.0 | 17 | 21 | 35.0 | 14,282 | 34.6 | –13.7 |
| Liberal Democrats | 6 | ▲1 | 28.6 | 8 | 14 | 23.3 | 9,893 | 24.0 | +3.9 |
| Independent | 1 | Steady | 4.8 | 0 | 1 | 1.7 | 1,613 | 3.9 | +3.6 |
| Green | 0 | Steady | 0.0 | 0 | 0 | 0.0 | 180 | 0.4 | –0.9 |
| Ratepayer | 0 | Steady | 0.0 | 0 | 0 | 0.0 | 88 | 0.2 | ±0.0 |

== Ward results ==
=== Barrow ===
Barrow
| Party | Candidate | Votes | % | ±% |
|---|---|---|---|---|
| Conservative | W. Mapes* | 1,120 | 68.8 | +9.1 |
| Labour | R. Barlow | 509 | 31.2 | –9.1 |
| Majority | | 611 | 37.5 | +18.1 |
| Turnout | | 1,629 | 44.0 | –5.0 |
| Registered electors | | 3,702 | | |
| Conservative hold | | Swing | ▲9.1 | |

=== Blacon Hall ===
Blacon Hall
| Party | Candidate | Votes | % | ±% |
|---|---|---|---|---|
| Labour | L. Price* | 1,321 | 84.8 | –4.2 |
| Conservative | T. Truesdale | 237 | 15.2 | +4.2 |
| Majority | | 1,084 | 69.6 | –8.4 |
| Turnout | | 1,558 | 36.5 | –9.6 |
| Registered electors | | 4,268 | | |
| Labour hold | | Swing | ▼4.2 | |

=== Boughton Heath ===
Boughton Heath
| Party | Candidate | Votes | % | ±% |
|---|---|---|---|---|
| Liberal Democrats | A. Farrell* | 1,363 | 48.1 | +7.7 |
| Conservative | A. Elloy | 1,125 | 39.7 | +3.8 |
| Labour | M. Thompson | 347 | 12.2 | –11.5 |
| Majority | | 238 | 8.4 | +3.9 |
| Turnout | | 2,835 | 63.3 | +0.2 |
| Registered electors | | 4,481 | | |
| Liberal Democrats hold | | Swing | ▲2.0 | |

=== Christleton ===
Christleton
| Party | Candidate | Votes | % | ±% |
|---|---|---|---|---|
| Conservative | S. Begbie | 1,080 | 57.8 | –12.8 |
| Labour | S. Wardman | 405 | 21.7 | –7.7 |
| Liberal Democrats | R. Beith | 383 | 20.5 | N/A |
| Majority | | 675 | 36.1 | N/A |
| Turnout | | 1,868 | 50.0 | +7.0 |
| Registered electors | | 3,735 | | |
| Conservative hold | | Swing | ▼2.6 | |

=== College ===
College
| Party | Candidate | Votes | % | ±% |
|---|---|---|---|---|
| Labour | R. Hughes | 1,178 | 58.3 | –6.5 |
| Conservative | H. Middleton | 519 | 25.7 | +4.5 |
| Liberal Democrats | D. Hooper | 236 | 11.7 | +2.4 |
| Ratepayer | D. Taylor | 88 | 4.4 | –0.2 |
| Majority | | 659 | 32.6 | –11.0 |
| Turnout | | 2,021 | 45.7 | –1.2 |
| Registered electors | | 4,423 | | |
| Labour hold | | Swing | ▼5.5 | |

=== Dee Point ===
Dee Point
| Party | Candidate | Votes | % | ±% |
|---|---|---|---|---|
| Labour | M. Nelson | 1,392 | 81.1 | –2.6 |
| Conservative | J. Jaworzyn | 325 | 18.9 | +2.6 |
| Majority | | 1,067 | 62.1 | N/A |
| Turnout | | 1,717 | 39.2 | –3.9 |
| Registered electors | | 4,382 | | |
| Labour hold | | Swing | ▼2.6 | |

=== Dodleston ===
Dodleston
| Party | Candidate | Votes | % | ±% |
|---|---|---|---|---|
| Conservative | W. Fair* | 597 | 68.7 | +8.6 |
| Labour | G. Thompson | 157 | 18.1 | +12.2 |
| Liberal Democrats | K. Prydderch | 115 | 13.2 | –20.8 |
| Majority | | 440 | 50.6 | +24.5 |
| Turnout | | 869 | 54.4 | –7.6 |
| Registered electors | | 1,596 | | |
| Conservative hold | | Swing | ▼2.0 | |

=== Elton ===
Elton
| Party | Candidate | Votes | % | ±% |
|---|---|---|---|---|
| Conservative | D. Rowlands | 1,196 | 57.9 | +11.5 |
| Labour | S. Rudd | 869 | 42.1 | –11.5 |
| Majority | | 327 | 15.8 | N/A |
| Turnout | | 2,065 | 46.5 | +1.4 |
| Registered electors | | 4,440 | | |
| Conservative hold | | Swing | ▲11.5 | |

=== Grosvenor ===
Grosvenor
| Party | Candidate | Votes | % | ±% |
|---|---|---|---|---|
| Conservative | M. Byatt* | 1,166 | 46.3 | +8.8 |
| Labour | W. Price | 937 | 37.2 | –9.4 |
| Liberal Democrats | P. Speirs | 414 | 16.4 | +6.1 |
| Majority | | 229 | 9.1 | N/A |
| Turnout | | 2,517 | 59.9 | –2.7 |
| Registered electors | | 4,199 | | |
| Conservative hold | | Swing | ▲9.1 | |

=== Hoole ===
Hoole
| Party | Candidate | Votes | % | ±% |
|---|---|---|---|---|
| Liberal Democrats | J. Smith* | 1,227 | 51.1 | +4.9 |
| Labour | M. Foster | 942 | 39.2 | +0.3 |
| Conservative | M. Stuart | 234 | 9.7 | +0.4 |
| Majority | | 285 | 11.9 | N/A |
| Turnout | | 2,403 | 59.0 | +1.1 |
| Registered electors | | 4,072 | | |
| Liberal Democrats hold | | Swing | ▲2.3 | |

=== Malpas ===
Malpas
| Party | Candidate | Votes | % | ±% |
|---|---|---|---|---|
| Conservative | L. Crump | 703 | 50.2 | –1.9 |
| Independent | C. Higgie | 599 | 42.8 | –5.1 |
| Labour | S. Murphy | 98 | 7.0 | N/A |
| Majority | | 104 | 7.4 | +3.2 |
| Turnout | | 1,400 | 47.4 | +2.9 |
| Registered electors | | 2,951 | | |
| Conservative hold | | Swing | ▲1.6 | |

=== Newton ===
Newton
| Party | Candidate | Votes | % | ±% |
|---|---|---|---|---|
| Liberal Democrats | D. Simpson | 973 | 42.0 | +2.2 |
| Conservative | J. Hibbert* | 904 | 39.0 | +5.5 |
| Labour | W. Houlsby | 440 | 19.0 | –7.6 |
| Majority | | 69 | 3.0 | –3.3 |
| Turnout | | 2,317 | 58.2 | –0.5 |
| Registered electors | | 3,981 | | |
| Liberal Democrats gain from Conservative | | Swing | ▼1.7 | |

=== Plas Newton ===
Plas Newton (2 seats due to by-election)
| Party | Candidate | Votes | % | ±% |
|---|---|---|---|---|
| Liberal Democrats | R. Hale* | 1,159 | 52.7 | +6.8 |
| Liberal Democrats | T. Ralph | 954 | 43.4 | –2.5 |
| Labour | R. Cross | 677 | 30.8 | –6.0 |
| Labour | W. Megarrell | 602 | 27.4 | –9.4 |
| Conservative | A. Smith | 500 | 22.7 | +6.4 |
| Conservative | W. Sutton | 500 | 22.7 | +5.4 |
| Turnout | | 2,198 | 59.7 | –5.2 |
| Registered electors | | 3,681 | | |
| Liberal Democrats hold | | | | |
| Liberal Democrats gain from Labour | | | | |

=== Saughall ===
Saughall
| Party | Candidate | Votes | % | ±% |
|---|---|---|---|---|
| Conservative | S. Davies | 730 | 43.8 | –26.3 |
| Liberal Democrats | J. Ballard | 602 | 36.1 | N/A |
| Labour | S. Newton | 334 | 20.0 | –9.9 |
| Majority | | 128 | 7.7 | –32.5 |
| Turnout | | 1,666 | 57.0 | +13.3 |
| Registered electors | | 2,921 | | |
| Conservative gain from Liberal Democrats | | | | |

=== Sealand ===
Sealand
| Party | Candidate | Votes | % | ±% |
|---|---|---|---|---|
| Labour | D. Nield* | 1,087 | 65.6 | –1.1 |
| Conservative | J. David | 328 | 19.8 | +2.8 |
| Liberal Democrats | J. Indermaur | 136 | 8.2 | N/A |
| Green | H. De Lemos | 105 | 6.3 | –2.0 |
| Majority | | 759 | 45.8 | –3.9 |
| Turnout | | 1,656 | 47.2 | –4.4 |
| Registered electors | | 3,505 | | |
| Labour hold | | Swing | ▼2.0 | |

=== Tarvin ===
Tarvin
| Party | Candidate | Votes | % | ±% |
|---|---|---|---|---|
| Conservative | C. Plenderleath* | 1,076 | 73.4 | +15.9 |
| Labour | A. Pegrum | 389 | 26.6 | –15.9 |
| Majority | | 687 | 46.9 | +31.9 |
| Turnout | | 1,465 | 45.2 | +0.6 |
| Registered electors | | 3,238 | | |
| Conservative hold | | Swing | ▲15.9 | |

=== Tattenhall ===
Tattenhall
| Party | Candidate | Votes | % | ±% |
|---|---|---|---|---|
| Independent | J. Haynes* | 1,014 | 84.2 | N/A |
| Labour | J. Oakden | 190 | 15.8 | –12.6 |
| Majority | | 824 | 68.4 | N/A |
| Turnout | | 1,204 | 46.5 | +13.2 |
| Registered electors | | 2,589 | | |
| Independent hold | | | | |

=== Upton Heath ===
Upton Heath
| Party | Candidate | Votes | % | ±% |
|---|---|---|---|---|
| Conservative | J. Cliffe | 1,140 | 45.5 | +7.9 |
| Labour | S. Grant | 1,099 | 43.9 | –8.2 |
| Liberal Democrats | P. Hancox | 265 | 10.6 | +0.3 |
| Majority | | 41 | 1.6 | N/A |
| Turnout | | 2,504 | 60.5 | –3.3 |
| Registered electors | | 4,136 | | |
| Conservative hold | | Swing | ▲8.1 | |

=== Vicars Cross ===
Vicars Cross
| Party | Candidate | Votes | % | ±% |
|---|---|---|---|---|
| Liberal Democrats | S. Proctor* | 1,453 | 64.3 | +12.8 |
| Conservative | C. Robson | 455 | 20.1 | –2.7 |
| Labour | E. Turner | 351 | 15.5 | –10.1 |
| Majority | | 988 | 44.2 | +18.2 |
| Turnout | | 2,260 | 53.7 | –3.3 |
| Registered electors | | 4,207 | | |
| Liberal Democrats hold | | Swing | ▲7.8 | |

=== Westminster ===
Westminster
| Party | Candidate | Votes | % | ±% |
|---|---|---|---|---|
| Conservative | R. Croft | 1,290 | 43.9 | +7.2 |
| Labour | L. Barlow | 958 | 32.6 | –8.8 |
| Liberal Democrats | A. Stobie | 613 | 20.9 | +3.5 |
| Green | T. Barker | 75 | 2.6 | –1.9 |
| Majority | | 332 | 11.3 | N/A |
| Turnout | | 2,936 | 63.8 | –0.5 |
| Registered electors | | 4,602 | | |
| Conservative hold | | Swing | ▲8.0 | |
