= 1980 Chester City Council election =

1980 English local election

← 1979	1 May 1980	1982 →

21 out of 60 seats to Chester City Council 31 seats needed for a majority
- Turnout: 41.1%

	First party	Second party	Third party
Party	Conservative	Labour	Liberal
Seats won	12	7	2
Seats after	38	14	4
Seat change	▼2	▲3	0
Popular vote	12,328	11,313	4,052
Percentage	40.5%	37.2%	13.3%
	Fourth party	Fifth party
Party	Residents	Independent
Seats won	0	0
Seats after	3	1
Seat change	▼1	0
Popular vote	2,627	127
Percentage	8.6%	0.4%
- Winner of each seat at the 1980 Chester City Council election
Council control before election
Conservative
Council control after election
Conservative

The 1980 Chester City Council election took place on 1 May 1980 to elect members of Chester City Council in Cheshire, England. This was on the same day as other local elections.

== Summary ==
=== Election results ===
1980 Chester City Council election
Party	This election			Full council			This election		
Party	Seats	Net	Seats %	Other	Total	Total %	Votes	Votes %	+/−
Conservative	12	▼2	57.1	26	38	63.3	12,328	40.5	
Labour	7	▲3	33.3	7	14	23.3	11,313	37.2	
Liberal	2	0	9.5	2	4	6.7	4,052	13.3	
Residents	0	▼1	0.0	3	3	5.0	2,627	8.6	
Independent	0	0	0.0	1	1	1.7	127	0.4	

== Ward results ==
=== Blacon Hill ===
Blacon Hill
Party	Candidate	Votes	%	±%
Labour	E. Locke*	1,072	85.0	+17.8
Conservative	L. Stoners	189	15.0	–17.8
Majority		883	70.0	N/A
Turnout		1,261	30.1	–41.7
Registered electors		4,181		
Labour hold		Swing	▲17.8	

=== Boughton ===
Boughton
Party	Candidate	Votes	%	±%
Conservative	E. Forster*	553	44.2	–4.0
Labour	S. Pickstock	445	35.6	–16.2
Residents	R. Jay	174	13.9	N/A
Liberal	J. Latham	79	6.3	N/A
Majority		108	8.6	N/A
Turnout		1,251	48.8	–27.0
Registered electors		2,564		
Conservative hold		Swing	▲6.1	

=== Christieton ===
Christieton
Party	Candidate	Votes	%	±%
Conservative	W. Morley*	847	58.4	+3.5
Residents	J. Morris	496	28.0	–1.0
Labour	R. Iball	198	13.6	–2.5
Majority		351	30.4	N/A
Turnout		1,451	39.7	–40.7
Registered electors		3,651		
Conservative hold		Swing	▲2.3	

=== College ===
College
Party	Candidate	Votes	%	±%
Labour	C. Russell	900	53.3	+1.1
Conservative	J. Hopkins*	613	36.3	–11.5
Residents	D. Taylor	176	10.4	N/A
Majority		287	17.0	N/A
Turnout		1,689	39.6	–29.8
Registered electors		4,266		
Labour gain from Conservative		Swing	▲6.3	

=== Curzon ===
Curzon
Party	Candidate	Votes	%	±%
Conservative	C. Elmerl*	587	44.0	–4.2
Labour	G. Goodall	436	32.7	+5.4
Liberal	S. Fraser	216	16.2	–8.3
Residents	S. Elmitt	95	7.1	N/A
Majority		151	11.3	N/A
Turnout		1,334	47.6	–27.3
Registered electors		2,800		
Conservative hold		Swing	▼4.8	

=== Dee Point ===
Dee Point (2 seats due to by-election)
Party	Candidate	Votes	%
Labour	R. Annand	1,213	77.4
Labour	D. Robinson*	1,170	74.6
Conservative	P. Benyon	353	22.5
Turnout		1,568	32.9
Registered electors		4,767	
Labour hold			
Labour hold			

=== Farndon ===
Farndon
Party	Candidate	Votes	%	±%
Conservative	S. Lloyd*	530	84.7	+1.0
Labour	W. Mordue	96	15.3	–1.0
Majority		434	69.3	+2.0
Turnout		626	39.5	–39.5
Registered electors		1,586		
Conservative hold		Swing	▲1.0	

=== Grosvenor ===
Grosvenor
Party	Candidate	Votes	%	±%
Conservative	F. Hignett*	917	48.8	+4.4
Labour	H. Owen	734	39.1	+8.7
Liberal	J. Indemaur	228	12.1	–13.1
Majority		183	9.7	N/A
Turnout		1,879	43.9	–33.1
Registered electors		4,283		
Conservative hold		Swing	▼2.2	

=== Hoole ===
Hoole
Party	Candidate	Votes	%	±%
Liberal	R. Stunell*	1,145	50.2	+8.4
Labour	J. Smith	610	26.8	+5.8
Conservative	C. Jackson	525	23.0	–4.2
Majority		535	23.5	N/A
Turnout		2,280	48.7	–28.7
Registered electors		4,677		
Liberal hold		Swing	▲1.3	

=== Malpas ===
Malpas
Party	Candidate	Votes	%	±%
Conservative	B. Hassall	809	71.4	N/A
Labour	J. Edgar	324	28.6	N/A
Majority		485	42.8	N/A
Turnout		1,133	40.7	N/A
Registered electors		2,783		
Conservative hold				

=== Newton ===
Newton
Party	Candidate	Votes	%	±%
Conservative	J. Jones*	983	53.8	+20.3
Labour	L. Harrison	501	27.4	+12.5
Liberal	D. Wynne-Jones	344	18.8	+1.2
Majority		482	26.4	N/A
Turnout		1,828	43.0	–35.2
Registered electors		4,255		
Conservative hold		Swing	▲3.9	

=== Plas Newton ===
Plas Newton
Party	Candidate	Votes	%	±%
Labour	J. Millard	730	42.5	–1.6
Conservative	A. Crowe	512	29.8	–2.6
Residents	W. Wilton	274	15.9	–7.5
Liberal	J. Mallender	202	11.8	N/A
Majority		218	12.7	N/A
Turnout		1,718	43.7	–36.2
Registered electors		3,935		
Labour gain from Conservative		Swing	▲0.5	

=== Saughall ===
Saughall
Party	Candidate	Votes	%	±%
Liberal	B. Kerr*	935	69.4	+17.8
Conservative	C. Brown	314	23.3	–11.2
Labour	C. Hierons	98	7.3	–6.6
Majority		620	46.1	N/A
Turnout		1,347	47.0	–34.5
Registered electors		2,864		
Liberal hold		Swing	▲14.5	

=== Sealand ===
Sealand
Party	Candidate	Votes	%	±%
Labour	J. Randall*	822	56.0	+17.6
Conservative	M. Edwards	647	44.0	+7.0
Majority		175	11.9	N/A
Turnout		1,469	36.6	–38.2
Registered electors		4,009		
Labour hold		Swing	▲5.3	

=== Tattenhall ===
Tattenhall
Party	Candidate	Votes	%	±%
Conservative	F. Pierce*	398	48.4	+12.8
Residents	L. Harvey	295	35.8	N/A
Labour	C. Warwood	130	15.8	N/A
Majority		103	12.5	N/A
Turnout		823	33.8	–45.6
Registered electors		2,436		
Conservative hold				

=== Upton Grange ===
Upton Grange
Party	Candidate	Votes	%	±%
Conservative	J. Butler*	695	59.7	+7.6
Labour	J. Artell	247	21.2	–2.3
Liberal	P. Lowry	222	19.1	N/A
Majority		448	38.5	N/A
Turnout		1,164	32.9	–33.5
Registered electors		3,541		
Conservative hold		Swing	▲5.0	

=== Upton Heath ===
Upton Heath
Party	Candidate	Votes	%	±%
Labour	R. Griffiths	661	36.5	+17.8
Conservative	E. Gerrard*	637	35.2	±0.0
Residents	D. Fellows	254	14.0	–13.0
Liberal	F. Wilson	173	9.6	–9.5
Independent	R. Palmer	86	4.7	N/A
Majority		24	1.3	N/A
Turnout		1,811	41.8	–38.5
Registered electors		4,331		
Labour gain from Conservative		Swing	▲8.9	

=== Vicars Cross ===
Vicars Cross
Party	Candidate	Votes	%	±%
Conservative	D. Williams*	787	40.6	+3.3
Residents	N. Smith	587	30.3	–13.9
Labour	E. Champion	288	14.9	–3.5
Liberal	K. Holding	277	14.3	N/A
Majority		200	10.3	N/A
Turnout		1,939	44.3	–36.1
Registered electors		4,339		
Conservative hold		Swing	▲8.6	

=== Waverton ===
Waverton
Party	Candidate	Votes	%	±%
Conservative	J. Bramhall	450	57.7	+8.8
Residents	A. Edwards*	276	35.4	–15.7
Labour	M. Rigby	54	6.9	N/A
Majority		174	22.3	N/A
Turnout		780	59.9	–21.1
Registered electors		1,302		
Conservative gain from Residents		Swing	▲12.3	

=== Westminster ===
Westminster
Party	Candidate	Votes	%	±%
Conservative	R. Short	982	53.4	+0.2
Labour	B. Trevelyan	584	31.8	+4.6
Liberal	B. Hall	231	12.6	–7.0
Independent	L. McHale	41	2.2	N/A
Majority		398	21.7	N/A
Turnout		1,838	41.4	–34.1
Registered electors		4,442		
Conservative hold		Swing	▼2.2	
