= 1986 Chester City Council election =

1986 UK local government election

← 1984	8 May 1986	1987 →

21 out of 60 seats to Chester City Council 31 seats needed for a majority
- Turnout: 45.6% (▲1.2%)

	First party	Second party
Party	Conservative	Labour
Last election	34 seats, 40.1%	16 seats, 37.2%
Seats won	10	8
Seats after	30	19
Seat change	▼4	▲3
Popular vote	11,635	12,625
Percentage	34.5%	37.5%
Swing	▼5.6%	▲0.3%
	Third party	Fourth party
Party	Alliance	Independent
Last election	9 seats, 22.4%	1 seat, 0.3%
Seats won	3	0
Seats after	10	1
Seat change	▲1	0
Popular vote	9,266	50
Percentage	27.5%	0.1%
Swing	▲5.1%	▼0.2%
- Winner of each seat at the 1986 Chester City Council election
Council control before election
Conservative
Council control after election
No overall control

The 1986 Chester City Council election took place on 8 May 1986 to elect members of Chester City Council in Cheshire, England. This was on the same day as other local elections.

== Summary ==
=== Election result ===
1986 Chester City Council election
Party	This election			Full council			This election		
Party	Seats	Net	Seats %	Other	Total	Total %	Votes	Votes %	+/−
Conservative	10	▼4	47.6	20	30	50.0	11,635	34.5	–5.6
Labour	8	▲3	38.1	11	19	31.7	12,625	37.5	+0.3
Alliance	3	▲1	14.3	7	10	16.7	9,266	27.5	+5.1
Independent	0	0	0.0	1	1	1.7	50	0.1	–0.2
Residents	0	0	0.0	0	0	0.0	105	0.3	New

== Ward results ==
=== Barrow ===
Barrow
Party	Candidate	Votes	%	±%
Conservative	M. Hasall	779	54.2	–8.4
Alliance	R. Hesketh	457	31.8	+6.4
Labour	R. Barlow	202	14.0	+2.0
Majority		322	22.4	–14.8
Turnout		1,438	45.0	±0.0
Registered electors		3,198		
Conservative hold		Swing	▼7.4	

=== Blacon Hall ===
Blacon Hall (2 seats due to by-election)
Party	Candidate	Votes	%
Labour	J. Price*	943	85.6
Labour	J. Randall	826	75.0
Conservative	F. Creswell	159	14.4
Turnout		1,102	25.2
Registered electors		4,371	
Labour hold			
Labour hold			

=== Boughton ===
Boughton
Party	Candidate	Votes	%	±%
Labour	C. Fortune	812	53.7	+7.4
Conservative	K. Doran	455	30.1	–9.0
Alliance	P. Atkinson	245	16.2	+1.5
Majority		357	23.6	+16.4
Turnout		1,512	60.8	+1.9
Registered electors		2,488		
Labour gain from Conservative		Swing	▲8.2	

=== Boughton Heath ===
Boughton Heath
Party	Candidate	Votes	%	±%
Conservative	A. Elloy	785	36.6	–3.9
Alliance	B. Neale	723	33.7	–16.1
Labour	D. Halley	585	27.3	+17.6
Independent	C. Sadler	50	2.3	N/A
Majority		62	2.9	N/A
Turnout		2,143	55.3	–2.4
Registered electors		3,877		
Conservative hold		Swing	▲6.1	

=== College ===
College
Party	Candidate	Votes	%	±%
Labour	S. Tasker	1,125	57.5	+2.0
Conservative	J. Snell	469	24.0	–6.1
Alliance	J. Handley	259	13.2	+4.5
Residents	D. Taylor	105	5.4	–0.4
Majority		656	33.5	+8.1
Turnout		1,958	45.2	+2.3
Registered electors		4,328		
Labour hold		Swing	▲4.1	

=== Curzon ===
Curzon
Party	Candidate	Votes	%	±%
Labour	A. Murphy	733	42.7	+9.7
Conservative	W. Johnstone*	602	35.1	–17.7
Alliance	S. Fraser	381	22.2	+8.0
Majority		131	7.6	N/A
Turnout		1,716	56.1	+7.5
Registered electors		3,060		
Labour gain from Conservative		Swing	▲13.7	

=== Dee Point ===
Dee Point
Party	Candidate	Votes	%	±%
Labour	M. Nelson	1,099	67.1	+3.4
Conservative	B. Andreson	353	21.5	–0.4
Alliance	E. Owen	187	11.4	–3.0
Majority		746	45.5	N/A
Turnout		1,639	34.8	+3.5
Registered electors		4,705		
Labour hold		Swing	▲1.9	

=== Elton ===
Elton
Party	Candidate	Votes	%	±%
Conservative	D. Rowlands*	863	56.9	+0.2
Labour	D. Cowper	376	24.8	+13.6
Alliance	D. Howells	279	18.4	–13.7
Majority		487	32.1	+7.5
Turnout		1,518	35.1	–9.2
Registered electors		4,321		
Conservative hold		Swing	▼6.7	

=== Grosvenor ===
Grosvenor
Party	Candidate	Votes	%	±%
Conservative	R. Cain*	923	39.8	–7.9
Labour	D. Dowswell	750	32.3	+3.0
Alliance	R. Playford	648	27.9	+4.9
Majority		173	7.5	–10.9
Turnout		2,321	52.0	–0.4
Registered electors		4,464		
Conservative hold		Swing	▼5.5	

=== Hoole ===
Hoole
Party	Candidate	Votes	%	±%
Alliance	E. Ward*	990	45.7	–5.4
Labour	D. Owen	905	41.8	+8.4
Conservative	A. Edwards	272	12.6	–2.8
Majority		85	3.9	–13.8
Turnout		2,167	48.6	–1.4
Registered electors		4,458		
Alliance hold		Swing	▼6.9	

=== Mollington ===
Mollington
Party	Candidate	Votes	%	±%
Conservative	T. Jones*	634	79.4	+3.0
Labour	S. Morris	164	20.6	+12.1
Majority		470	58.9	–2.5
Turnout		798	42.7	–2.5
Registered electors		1,869		
Conservative hold		Swing	▼4.5	

=== Newton ===
Newton
Party	Candidate	Votes	%	±%
Conservative	S. Garston*	913	51.5	–8.6
Alliance	L. Irvine	495	27.9	+8.1
Labour	R. Hampson	365	20.6	+0.5
Majority		418	23.6	–16.4
Turnout		1,773	43.2	+3.0
Registered electors		4,148		
Conservative hold		Swing	▼8.4	

=== Plas Newton ===
Plas Newton
Party	Candidate	Votes	%	±%
Labour	S. Simpson	693	36.0	–9.3
Alliance	R. Hale	682	35.4	+20.3
Conservative	J. Owens-Kay*	551	28.6	–11.0
Majority		11	0.6	–5.0
Turnout		1,926	50.1	+2.0
Registered electors		3,843		
Labour gain from Conservative		Swing	▼14.8	

=== Sealand ===
Sealand
Party	Candidate	Votes	%	±%
Labour	E. Pickering	1,005	62.3	+16.2
Conservative	E. Astill	364	22.6	–6.7
Alliance	P. Hollins	243	15.1	–9.5
Majority		641	39.8	N/A
Turnout		1,612	43.0	–5.5
Registered electors		3,748		
Labour hold		Swing	▲11.5	

=== Tarvin ===
Tarvin
Party	Candidate	Votes	%	±%
Conservative	P. Walker	602	47.4	–25.2
Alliance	J. Trowell	480	37.8	+21.2
Labour	A. Pegrum	187	14.7	+3.9
Majority		122	9.6	–46.4
Turnout		1,269	40.7	–4.2
Registered electors		3,115		
Conservative hold		Swing	▼23.2	

=== Tilston ===
Tilston
Party	Candidate	Votes	%	±%
Conservative	A. Hough*	Unopposed		
Registered electors		1,283		
Conservative hold				

=== Upton Grange ===
Upton Grange
Party	Candidate	Votes	%	±%
Alliance	D. Evans	787	52.3	+14.6
Conservative	G. Llewellyn-Jones	565	37.6	–12.8
Labour	I. Longdin	152	10.1	–1.8
Majority		222	14.8	N/A
Turnout		1,504	51.9	+4.6
Registered electors		2,897		
Alliance gain from Conservative		Swing	▲13.7	

=== Upton Heath ===
Upton Heath
Party	Candidate	Votes	%	±%
Conservative	E. Gerrard*	823	37.2	–2.6
Labour	S. Grant	800	36.1	–10.0
Alliance	C. Bain	591	26.7	+12.6
Majority		23	1.0	N/A
Turnout		2,214	52.0	+2.3
Registered electors		4,257		
Conservative hold		Swing	▲3.7	

=== Vicars Cross ===
Vicars Cross
Party	Candidate	Votes	%	±%
Alliance	G. Proctor*	1,340	62.2	+10.7
Conservative	J. Boughton	448	20.8	–12.1
Labour	S. Jenkins	366	17.0	+1.4
Majority		892	41.4	–4.6
Turnout		2,154	50.4	+4.4
Registered electors		4,278		
Alliance hold		Swing	▲11.4	

=== Westminster ===
Westminster
Party	Candidate	Votes	%	±%
Conservative	I. Ellis	1,075	51.4	–11.4
Labour	G. Booth	537	25.7	+1.9
Alliance	S. Mole	479	22.9	+9.6
Majority		538	25.7	–13.3
Turnout		2,091	43.8	+6.2
Registered electors		4,769		
Conservative hold		Swing	▼6.7	
