= 1990 Chester City Council election =

1990 English local election

← 1988	3 May 1990	1991 →

22 out of 60 seats to Chester City Council 31 seats needed for a majority

	First party	Second party
Party	Conservative	Labour
Last election	30 seats, 41.8%	19 seats, 41.8%
Seats won	4	11
Seats after	24	22
Seat change	▼6	▲3
Popular vote	13,514	21,916
Percentage	29.8%	48.3%
Swing	▼12.0%	▲6.5%
	Third party	Fourth party
Party	Liberal Democrats	Independent
Last election	10 seats, 13.7%	1 seat, 1.7%
Seats won	7	0
Seats after	13	1
Seat change	▲3	Steady
Popular vote	9,095	146
Percentage	20.1%	0.3%
Swing	▲6.4%	▼1.4%
- Winner of each seat at the 1990 Chester City Council election
Council control before election
No overall control
Council control after election
No overall control

The 1990 Chester City Council election took place on 3 May 1990 to elect members of Chester City Council in Cheshire, England. This was on the same day as other local elections.

== Summary ==
=== Election result ===
1990 Chester City Council election
Party	This election			Full council			This election		
Party	Seats	Net	Seats %	Other	Total	Total %	Votes	Votes %	+/−
Conservative	4	▼6	18.2	20	24	40.0	13,514	29.8	–12.0
Labour	11	▲3	50.0	11	22	36.7	21,916	48.3	+6.5
Liberal Democrats	7	▲3	31.8	6	13	21.7	9,095	20.1	+6.4
Independent	0	Steady	0.0	1	1	1.7	146	0.3	–1.4
Green	0	Steady	0.0	0	0	0.0	583	1.3	N/A
Ratepayer	0	Steady	0.0	0	0	0.0	102	0.2	–0.1

== Ward results ==
=== Barrow ===
Barrow
Party	Candidate	Votes	%	±%
Conservative	M. Hassall*	1,101	59.7	+1.3
Labour	R. Barlow	743	40.3	+28.3
Majority		358	19.4	–9.4
Turnout		1,844	49.0	–1.7
Registered electors		3,763		
Conservative hold		Swing	▼13.5	

=== Blacon Hall ===
Blacon Hall
Party	Candidate	Votes	%	±%
Labour	J. Price*	1,752	89.0	+4.7
Conservative	C. Waywell	216	11.0	–4.7
Majority		1,536	78.0	+4.7
Turnout		1,968	46.1	+11.3
Registered electors		4,271		
Labour hold		Swing	▲4.7	

=== Boughton ===
Boughton
Party	Candidate	Votes	%	±%
Labour	C. Fortune*	1,049	68.6	–3.4
Conservative	B. Entwistle	357	23.3	–4.7
Liberal Democrats	J. Latham	124	8.1	N/A
Majority		692	45.2	+1.2
Turnout		1,530	60.2	+3.0
Registered electors		2,543		
Labour hold		Swing	▼0.7	

=== Boughton Heath ===
Boughton Heath
Party	Candidate	Votes	%	±%
Liberal Democrats	J. Kennerley	1,143	40.4	–2.9
Conservative	A. Elloy	1,016	35.9	–1.6
Labour	M. Thompson	670	23.7	+4.5
Majority		127	4.5	–1.3
Turnout		2,829	63.1	+1.1
Registered electors		4,482		
Liberal Democrats gain from Conservative		Swing	▼0.7	

=== College ===
College
Party	Candidate	Votes	%	±%
Labour	R. Gilogly	1,423	64.8	–1.1
Conservative	H. Middleton	466	21.2	–7.0
Liberal Democrats	J. Indermaur	205	9.3	N/A
Ratepayer	D. Taylor	102	4.6	–1.2
Majority		957	43.6	+5.9
Turnout		2,196	46.9	+0.6
Registered electors		4,682		
Labour hold		Swing	▲3.0	

=== Curzon ===
Curzon
Party	Candidate	Votes	%	±%
Labour	A. Murphy*	1,275	61.6	+8.7
Conservative	L. Parkes	796	38.4	–8.7
Majority		479	23.1	+17.7
Turnout		2,071	68.9	+2.9
Registered electors		3,004		
Labour hold		Swing	▲8.7	

=== Dee Point ===
Dee Point (2 seats due to by-election)
Party	Candidate	Votes	%	±%
Labour	R. Jones	1,649	86.8	+8.1
Labour	M. Nelson*	1,523	80.2	+1.5
Conservative	B. Anderson	322	17.0	–4.3
Conservative	J. Anderson	302	15.9	–5.4
Turnout		1,899	43.1	+3.4
Registered electors		4,406		
Labour hold				
Labour hold				

=== Elton ===
Elton
Party	Candidate	Votes	%	±%
Labour	B. Cowper	1,079	53.6	+31.4
Conservative	D. Rowlands*	934	46.4	–12.7
Majority		145	7.2	N/A
Turnout		2,013	45.1	+0.1
Registered electors		4,462		
Labour gain from Conservative		Swing	▲22.1	

=== Grosvenor ===
Grosvenor
Party	Candidate	Votes	%	±%
Labour	P. Mitchell	1,235	46.6	–0.2
Conservative	R. Cain*	994	37.5	–15.7
Liberal Democrats	P. Speirs	273	10.3	N/A
Green	B. Burnett	146	5.5	N/A
Majority		241	9.1	N/A
Turnout		2,648	62.6	+11.3
Registered electors		4,228		
Labour gain from Conservative		Swing	▲7.8	

=== Hoole ===
Hoole (2 seats due to by-election)
Party	Candidate	Votes	%	±%
Liberal Democrats	E. Bolton	1,203	49.9	–0.7
Liberal Democrats	T. Veitch	1,014	42.1	–8.5
Labour	S. Georgeson	1,012	42.0	+7.1
Labour	J. Jones	985	40.9	+6.0
Conservative	A. Edwards	242	10.0	–4.4
Conservative	J. Lloyd	214	8.9	–5.5
Green	C. Herbstritt	145	6.0	N/A
Turnout		2,409	57.9	+6.6
Registered electors		4,160		
Liberal Democrats hold				
Liberal Democrats hold				

=== Mollington ===
Mollington
Party	Candidate	Votes	%	±%
Conservative	T. Jones*	551	64.1	–15.3
Labour	A. French	309	35.9	+15.3
Majority		242	28.1	–30.8
Turnout		860	44.2	+1.5
Registered electors		1,946		
Conservative hold		Swing	▼15.3	

=== Newton ===
Newton
Party	Candidate	Votes	%	±%
Liberal Democrats	M. Garrod	951	39.8	+3.3
Conservative	S. Garston*	800	33.5	–11.2
Labour	W. Megarrell	636	26.6	+7.8
Majority		151	6.3	N/A
Turnout		2,387	58.7	+9.3
Registered electors		4,066		
Liberal Democrats gain from Conservative		Swing	▲7.3	

=== Plas Newton ===
Plas Newton
Party	Candidate	Votes	%	±%
Liberal Democrats	M. Hale	1,115	45.9	+16.0
Labour	R. Cross	895	36.8	–8.1
Conservative	W. Sutton	420	17.3	–7.8
Majority		220	9.1	N/A
Turnout		2,430	64.9	+3.4
Registered electors		3,744		
Liberal Democrats gain from Labour		Swing	▲12.1	

=== Sealand ===
Sealand
Party	Candidate	Votes	%	±%
Labour	S. Phillips	1,243	66.7	–7.6
Conservative	A. Smith	317	17.0	–8.7
Green	V. Button	155	8.3	N/A
Independent	J. Robinson	148	7.9	N/A
Majority		926	49.7	+1.1
Turnout		1,863	51.6	+8.1
Registered electors		3,612		
Labour hold		Swing	▲0.6	

=== Tarvin ===
Tarvin
Party	Candidate	Votes	%	±%
Conservative	M. Johnson	840	57.5	+2.2
Labour	A. Pegrum	621	42.5	+31.1
Majority		219	15.0	–7.0
Turnout		1,461	44.6	–6.5
Registered electors		3,279		
Conservative hold		Swing	▼14.5	

=== Tilston ===
Tilston
Party	Candidate	Votes	%	±%
Conservative	A. Hough*	494	70.9	N/A
Labour	S. Murphy	203	29.1	N/A
Majority		291	41.8	N/A
Turnout		697	53.2	N/A
Registered electors		1,309		
Conservative hold				

=== Upton Grange ===
Upton Grange
Party	Candidate	Votes	%	±%
Liberal Democrats	D. Evans*	996	56.9	+15.8
Conservative	J. Peacock	437	25.0	–18.7
Labour	S. Taylor	316	18.1	+2.8
Majority		559	32.0	N/A
Turnout		1,749	59.9	+9.2
Registered electors		2,921		
Liberal Democrats hold		Swing	▲17.3	

=== Upton Heath ===
Upton Heath
Party	Candidate	Votes	%	±%
Labour	P. Devine	1,415	52.1	+3.2
Conservative	K. Cliffe	1,020	37.6	–3.0
Liberal Democrats	C. Bain	279	10.3	–0.2
Majority		395	14.6	+6.3
Turnout		2,714	63.8	+4.5
Registered electors		4,257		
Labour gain from Conservative		Swing	▲3.1	

=== Vicars Cross ===
Vicars Cross
Party	Candidate	Votes	%	±%
Liberal Democrats	G. Proctor*	1,264	51.5	–0.9
Labour	E. Turner	627	25.6	+10.1
Conservative	M. Vickers	562	22.9	–9.2
Majority		637	26.0	+5.8
Turnout		2,453	57.0	+7.5
Registered electors		4,306		
Liberal Democrats hold		Swing	▼5.5	

=== Westminster ===
Westminster
Party	Candidate	Votes	%	±%
Labour	H. Hills	1,256	41.4	+6.5
Conservative	R. Randle	1,113	36.7	–18.1
Liberal Democrats	A. Stobie	528	17.4	N/A
Green	M. Barker	137	4.5	N/A
Majority		143	4.7	N/A
Turnout		3,034	64.3	+13.6
Registered electors		4,715		
Labour gain from Conservative		Swing	▲12.3	
