= 1987 Chester City Council election =

1987 English local election

| ← 1986 | 7 May 1987 | 1988 → |

21 out of 60 seats to Chester City Council 31 seats needed for a majority

| | First party | Second party |
|---|---|---|
| Party | Conservative | Labour |
| Last election | 30 seats, 34.5% | 19 seats, 37.5% |
| Seats won | 10 | 5 |
| Seats after | 30 | 18 |
| Seat change | Steady | ▼1 |
| Popular vote | 15,287 | 12,728 |
| Percentage | 37.3% | 31.1% |
| Swing | ▲2.8% | ▼6.4% |
| | Third party | Fourth party |
| Party | Alliance | Independent |
| Last election | 10 seats, 27.5% | 1 seat, 0.1% |
| Seats won | 5 | 1 |
| Seats after | 11 | 1 |
| Seat change | ▲1 | Steady |
| Popular vote | 11,958 | 903 |
| Percentage | 29.2% | 2.2% |
| Swing | ▲1.7% | ▲2.1% |
- Winner of each seat at the 1987 Chester City Council election
Council control before election
No overall control
Council control after election
No overall control

The 1987 Chester City Council election took place on 7 May 1987 to elect members of Chester City Council in Cheshire, England. This was on the same day as other local elections.

== Summary ==
=== Election result ===
1987 Chester City Council election
| Party | This election | | | Full council | | | This election | | |
| Party | Seats | Net | Seats % | Other | Total | Total % | Votes | Votes % | +/− |
|---|---|---|---|---|---|---|---|---|---|
| Conservative | 10 | Steady | 47.6 | 20 | 30 | 50.0 | 15,287 | 37.3 | +2.8 |
| Labour | 5 | ▼1 | 23.8 | 13 | 18 | 30.0 | 12,728 | 31.1 | –6.4 |
| Alliance | 5 | ▲1 | 23.8 | 6 | 11 | 18.3 | 11,958 | 29.2 | +1.7 |
| Independent | 1 | Steady | 4.8 | 0 | 1 | 1.7 | 903 | 2.2 | +2.1 |
| Residents | 0 | Steady | 0.0 | 0 | 0 | 0.0 | 113 | 0.3 | ±0.0 |

== Ward results ==
=== Barrow ===
Barrow
| Party | Candidate | Votes | % | ±% |
|---|---|---|---|---|
| Conservative | W. Mapes* | 952 | 58.4 | +4.2 |
| Alliance | R. Hesketh | 483 | 29.6 | –2.2 |
| Labour | R. Barlow | 196 | 12.0 | –2.0 |
| Majority | | 469 | 28.8 | +6.4 |
| Turnout | | 1,631 | 50.7 | +5.7 |
| Registered electors | | 3,234 | | |
| Conservative hold | | Swing | ▲3.2 | |

=== Blacon Hall ===
Blacon Hall
| Party | Candidate | Votes | % | ±% |
|---|---|---|---|---|
| Labour | L. Price* | 1,130 | 68.2 | –17.4 |
| Conservative | F. Cresswell | 312 | 18.8 | +4.4 |
| Alliance | W. Pashley | 215 | 13.0 | N/A |
| Majority | | 818 | 49.4 | N/A |
| Turnout | | 1,657 | 37.7 | +12.5 |
| Registered electors | | 4,417 | | |
| Labour hold | | Swing | ▼10.9 | |

=== Boughton Heath ===
Boughton Heath
| Party | Candidate | Votes | % | ±% |
|---|---|---|---|---|
| Alliance | A. Farrell* | 1,086 | 43.3 | +9.6 |
| Conservative | G. Reece | 940 | 37.5 | +0.9 |
| Labour | D. Halley | 480 | 19.2 | –8.1 |
| Majority | | 146 | 5.8 | N/A |
| Turnout | | 2,506 | 62.0 | +6.7 |
| Registered electors | | 4,098 | | |
| Alliance hold | | Swing | ▲8.7 | |

=== Christieton ===
Christieton
| Party | Candidate | Votes | % | ±% |
|---|---|---|---|---|
| Conservative | C. Storrar | 1,261 | 59.3 | –6.5 |
| Alliance | W. Carlen | 508 | 23.9 | +6.9 |
| Labour | S. Murphy | 359 | 16.9 | –0.4 |
| Majority | | 753 | 35.4 | –13.1 |
| Turnout | | 2,128 | 57.1 | +15.0 |
| Registered electors | | 3,738 | | |
| Conservative hold | | Swing | ▼6.7 | |

=== College ===
College
| Party | Candidate | Votes | % | ±% |
|---|---|---|---|---|
| Labour | G. Cooper | 1,124 | 51.8 | –5.7 |
| Conservative | A. Hodgson | 632 | 29.1 | +5.1 |
| Alliance | J. Handley | 301 | 13.9 | +0.7 |
| Residents | D. Taylor | 113 | 5.2 | –0.2 |
| Majority | | 492 | 22.7 | –10.8 |
| Turnout | | 2,170 | 48.4 | +3.2 |
| Registered electors | | 4,498 | | |
| Labour hold | | Swing | ▲5.4 | |

=== Dee Point ===
Dee Point (2 seats due to by-election)
| Party | Candidate | Votes | % | ±% |
|---|---|---|---|---|
| Labour | S. Atkinson | 1,229 | 64.8 | –2.3 |
| Labour | D. Southall* | 1,146 | 60.4 | –6.7 |
| Conservative | P. Harris | 387 | 20.4 | –1.1 |
| Alliance | D. Hooper | 337 | 17.8 | +6.4 |
| Alliance | J. Indemaur | 245 | 12.9 | +1.5 |
| Turnout | | 1,898 | 40.9 | +6.1 |
| Registered electors | | 4,640 | | |
| Labour hold | | | | |
| Labour hold | | | | |

=== Dodleston ===
Dodleston
| Party | Candidate | Votes | % | ±% |
|---|---|---|---|---|
| Conservative | W. Fair* | 607 | 60.1 | –18.4 |
| Alliance | H. Fearnall | 343 | 34.0 | +22.0 |
| Labour | K. Stephenson | 60 | 5.9 | –3.6 |
| Majority | | 264 | 26.1 | –40.4 |
| Turnout | | 1,010 | 62.0 | +4.9 |
| Registered electors | | 1,631 | | |
| Conservative hold | | Swing | ▼20.2 | |

=== Elton ===
Elton
| Party | Candidate | Votes | % | ±% |
|---|---|---|---|---|
| Conservative | K. Peate* | 1,139 | 59.1 | +2.2 |
| Labour | B. Cowper | 427 | 22.2 | –2.6 |
| Alliance | L. Mitchell | 360 | 18.7 | +0.3 |
| Majority | | 712 | 36.9 | +4.8 |
| Turnout | | 1,926 | 45.0 | +9.9 |
| Registered electors | | 4,304 | | |
| Conservative hold | | Swing | ▲2.4 | |

=== Grosvenor ===
Grosvenor
| Party | Candidate | Votes | % | ±% |
|---|---|---|---|---|
| Conservative | M. Byatt* | 1,150 | 46.3 | +6.5 |
| Labour | D. Dowswell | 825 | 33.2 | +0.9 |
| Alliance | T. Veitch | 507 | 20.4 | –7.5 |
| Majority | | 325 | 13.1 | +5.6 |
| Turnout | | 2,482 | 55.6 | +3.6 |
| Registered electors | | 4,492 | | |
| Conservative hold | | Swing | ▲2.8 | |

=== Hoole ===
Hoole
| Party | Candidate | Votes | % | ±% |
|---|---|---|---|---|
| Alliance | J. Smith* | 1,059 | 45.6 | –0.1 |
| Labour | W. Crampton | 860 | 37.1 | –4.7 |
| Conservative | V. Holding | 401 | 17.3 | +4.7 |
| Majority | | 199 | 8.5 | +4.6 |
| Turnout | | 2,320 | 53.1 | +4.5 |
| Registered electors | | 4,372 | | |
| Alliance hold | | Swing | ▲2.3 | |

=== Malpas ===
Malpas
| Party | Candidate | Votes | % | ±% |
|---|---|---|---|---|
| Conservative | E. Bamforth | 760 | 52.7 | –8.1 |
| Alliance | C. Higgle | 601 | 41.6 | +20.5 |
| Labour | D. Owen | 82 | 5.7 | –12.4 |
| Majority | | 159 | 11.1 | –28.5 |
| Turnout | | 1,443 | 51.6 | –0.1 |
| Registered electors | | 2,828 | | |
| Conservative hold | | Swing | ▼14.3 | |

=== Newton ===
Newton
| Party | Candidate | Votes | % | ±% |
|---|---|---|---|---|
| Conservative | J. Hibbert* | 988 | 43.3 | –8.2 |
| Alliance | M. Garrod | 915 | 40.1 | +12.2 |
| Labour | G. Cross | 381 | 16.7 | –3.9 |
| Majority | | 73 | 3.2 | –20.4 |
| Turnout | | 2,284 | 55.1 | +11.9 |
| Registered electors | | 4,156 | | |
| Conservative hold | | Swing | ▼10.2 | |

=== Plas Newton ===
Plas Newton
| Party | Candidate | Votes | % | ±% |
|---|---|---|---|---|
| Alliance | R. Hale | 949 | 39.0 | +3.6 |
| Labour | J. Arrowsmith* | 884 | 36.3 | +0.3 |
| Conservative | G. Llewellyn-Jones | 602 | 24.7 | –3.9 |
| Majority | | 65 | 2.7 | N/A |
| Turnout | | 2,435 | 63.6 | +13.5 |
| Registered electors | | 3,831 | | |
| Alliance gain from Labour | | Swing | ▲1.7 | |

=== Saughall ===
Saughall
| Party | Candidate | Votes | % | ±% |
|---|---|---|---|---|
| Alliance | D. Whitton* | 621 | 44.9 | –24.1 |
| Conservative | A. Coughlan | 585 | 42.3 | +18.8 |
| Labour | J. Scanlan | 176 | 12.7 | +5.2 |
| Majority | | 36 | 2.6 | –42.8 |
| Turnout | | 1,382 | 46.9 | +1.1 |
| Registered electors | | 2,962 | | |
| Alliance hold | | Swing | ▼21.5 | |

=== Sealand ===
Sealand
| Party | Candidate | Votes | % | ±% |
|---|---|---|---|---|
| Labour | D. Neild* | 1,150 | 61.9 | –0.4 |
| Conservative | E. Astill | 489 | 26.3 | +3.7 |
| Alliance | H. Carlen | 218 | 11.7 | –3.4 |
| Majority | | 661 | 35.6 | –4.2 |
| Turnout | | 1,857 | 49.9 | +6.9 |
| Registered electors | | 3,732 | | |
| Labour hold | | Swing | ▼2.1 | |

=== Tarvin ===
Tarvin
| Party | Candidate | Votes | % | ±% |
|---|---|---|---|---|
| Conservative | C. Plenderleath | 892 | 55.3 | +7.9 |
| Alliance | J. Trowell | 537 | 33.3 | –4.5 |
| Labour | A. Pegrum | 184 | 11.4 | –3.3 |
| Majority | | 355 | 22.0 | +12.4 |
| Turnout | | 1,613 | 51.1 | +10.4 |
| Registered electors | | 3,166 | | |
| Conservative hold | | Swing | ▲6.2 | |

=== Tattenhall ===
Tattenhall
| Party | Candidate | Votes | % | ±% |
|---|---|---|---|---|
| Independent | J. Haynes* | 903 | 83.8 | N/A |
| Alliance | N. Bates | 174 | 16.2 | N/A |
| Majority | | 729 | 67.6 | N/A |
| Turnout | | 1,077 | 43.1 | +16.0 |
| Registered electors | | 2,511 | | |
| Independent hold | | | | |

=== Upton Heath ===
Upton Heath
| Party | Candidate | Votes | % | ±% |
|---|---|---|---|---|
| Conservative | C. Houlbrook* | 1,087 | 41.3 | +4.1 |
| Labour | S. Grant | 897 | 34.1 | –2.0 |
| Alliance | C. Bain | 647 | 24.6 | –2.1 |
| Majority | | 190 | 7.2 | +6.2 |
| Turnout | | 2,631 | 61.9 | +9.9 |
| Registered electors | | 4,255 | | |
| Conservative hold | | Swing | ▲3.1 | |

=== Vicars Cross ===
Vicars Cross
| Party | Candidate | Votes | % | ±% |
|---|---|---|---|---|
| Alliance | S. Proctor* | 1,341 | 55.2 | –7.0 |
| Conservative | B. Anderson | 727 | 29.9 | +9.1 |
| Labour | S. Jenkins | 362 | 14.9 | –2.1 |
| Majority | | 614 | 25.3 | –16.1 |
| Turnout | | 2,430 | 56.5 | +6.1 |
| Registered electors | | 4,305 | | |
| Alliance hold | | Swing | ▼8.1 | |

=== Westminster ===
Westminster
| Party | Candidate | Votes | % | ±% |
|---|---|---|---|---|
| Conservative | P. White* | 1,376 | 51.7 | +0.3 |
| Labour | S. Hesketh | 776 | 29.1 | +3.4 |
| Alliance | D. Simpson | 511 | 19.2 | –3.7 |
| Majority | | 600 | 22.6 | –3.1 |
| Turnout | | 2,663 | 55.7 | +11.9 |
| Registered electors | | 4,796 | | |
| Conservative hold | | Swing | ▼1.6 | |
