= 1982 Chester City Council election =

1982 English local election

← 1980	6 May 1982	1983 →

23 out of 60 seats to Chester City Council 31 seats needed for a majority
- Turnout: 44.4% (▲3.3%)

	First party	Second party	Third party
Party	Conservative	Labour	Alliance
Last election	38 seats, 40.5%	14 seats, 37.2%	4 seats, 13.3%
Seats won	17	4	2
Seats after	37	14	6
Seat change	▼1	0	▲2
Popular vote	16,273	9,714	11,332
Percentage	43.5%	26.0%	30.3%
Swing	▲3.0%	▼11.2%	▲17.0%
	Fourth party	Fifth party
Party	Residents	Independent
Last election	3 seats, 8.3%	1 seat, 0.4%
Seats won	0	0
Seats after	2	1
Seat change	▼1	0
Popular vote	101	N/A
Percentage	0.3%	N/A
Swing	▼8.0%	▼0.4%
- Winner of each seat at the 1982 Chester City Council election
Council control before election
Conservative
Council control after election
Conservative

The 1982 Chester City Council election took place on 6 May 1982 to elect members of Chester City Council in Cheshire, England. This was on the same day as other local elections.

== Summary ==
=== Election result ===
1982 Chester City Council election
Party	This election			Full council			This election		
Party	Seats	Net	Seats %	Other	Total	Total %	Votes	Votes %	+/−
Conservative	17	▼1	73.9	20	37	61.7	16,273	43.5	+3.0
Labour	4	0	17.4	10	14	23.3	9,714	26.0	–11.2
Alliance	2	▲2	8.7	4	6	10.0	11,332	30.3	+17.0
Residents	0	▼1	0.0	2	2	3.3	101	0.3	–8.0
Independent	0	0	0.0	1	1	1.7	N/A	N/A	–0.4

== Ward results ==
=== Barrow ===
Barrow
Party	Candidate	Votes	%	±%
Conservative	B. Tunstall*	739	56.2	N/A
Alliance	O. Lonsborough	468	35.6	N/A
Labour	R. Barlow	108	8.2	N/A
Majority		271	20.6	N/A
Turnout		1,315	40.6	N/A
Registered electors		3,243		
Conservative hold				

=== Blacon Hill ===
Blacon Hill (2 seats due to by-election)
Party	Candidate	Votes	%
Labour	J. Price*	999	66.5
Labour	J. Vernon	840	55.9
Alliance	M. Norton	282	18.8
Alliance	D. Howells	249	16.6
Conservative	J. Robinson	243	16.2
Turnout		1,502	35.2
Registered electors		4,266	
Labour hold			
Labour hold			

=== Boughton ===
Boughton
Party	Candidate	Votes	%	±%
Conservative	G. Llewellyn-Jones	528	43.8	–0.4
Labour	S. Pickstock	418	34.7	–0.9
Alliance	R. Jay	260	21.6	+15.3
Majority		110	9.1	+0.5
Turnout		1,206	47.2	–1.6
Registered electors		2,562		
Conservative gain from Labour		Swing	▲0.3	

=== Boughton Heath ===
Boughton Heath
Party	Candidate	Votes	%	±%
Conservative	A. Bell	822	47.7	+9.2
Alliance	A. Farrell	721	41.9	+24.4
Labour	A. Williams	179	10.4	–14.9
Majority		101	5.9	N/A
Turnout		1,722	58.0	–24.4
Registered electors		2,995		
Conservative hold		Swing	▼7.6	

=== College ===
College
Party	Candidate	Votes	%	±%
Labour	W. Hughes	679	38.1	–15.2
Conservative	R. Amsden*	634	35.6	–0.7
Alliance	R. Barritt	368	20.7	N/A
Residents	D. Taylor	101	5.7	–4.7
Majority		45	2.5	–14.0
Turnout		1,782	41.3	+1.7
Registered electors		4,329		
Labour gain from Conservative		Swing	▼7.3	

=== Curzon ===
Curzon
Party	Candidate	Votes	%	±%
Conservative	W. Johnstone*	697	48.4	+4.4
Alliance	R. Green	403	28.0	+11.8
Labour	G. Goddard	339	23.6	–9.1
Majority		294	20.4	+9.1
Turnout		1,439	48.5	+0.9
Registered electors		2,977		
Conservative hold		Swing	▼3.7	

=== Dee Point ===
Dee Point
Party	Candidate	Votes	%	±%
Labour	D. Robinson*	1,003	60.2	–17.3
Conservative	P. Benyon	335	20.1	–2.4
Alliance	G. Wilson	328	19.7	N/A
Majority		668	40.1	N/A
Turnout		1,666	34.7	+1.8
Registered electors		4,843		
Labour hold		Swing	▼7.5	

=== Elton ===
Elton
Party	Candidate	Votes	%	±%
Conservative	D. Rowlands*	888	46.4	–17.6
Alliance	S. Hugill	850	44.4	N/A
Labour	R. Iball	175	9.1	–26.9
Majority		38	2.0	N/A
Turnout		1,913	46.4	–31.6
Registered electors		4,127		
Conservative hold				

=== Grosvenor ===
Grosvenor
Party	Candidate	Votes	%	±%
Conservative	R. Cain	1,024	50.9	+2.1
Alliance	H. Fearnall*	503	25.0	+12.9
Labour	E. Sproston	486	24.1	–15.0
Majority		521	25.9	+16.2
Turnout		2,013	47.1	+3.2
Registered electors		4,279		
Conservative hold		Swing	▲5.4	

=== Hoole ===
Hoole
Party	Candidate	Votes	%	±%
Alliance	E. Ward	1,020	49.3	–0.9
Labour	H. Jones	587	28.4	+1.6
Conservative	K. Nattrass	461	22.3	–0.7
Majority		433	20.9	–2.6
Turnout		2,068	44.9	–3.8
Registered electors		4,615		
Alliance gain from Conservative		Swing	▼1.3	

=== Mollington ===
Mollington
Party	Candidate	Votes	%	±%
Conservative	T. Jones*	620	76.4	–3.4
Alliance	D. Cooper	122	15.0	N/A
Labour	G. Cairns	69	8.5	–11.7
Majority		498	61.4	+1.8
Turnout		811	45.2	–29.7
Registered electors		1,801		
Conservative hold				

=== Newton ===
Newton (2 seats due to by-election)
Party	Candidate	Votes	%
Conservative	S. Garston*	1,109	55.3
Conservative	J. Ebo	987	49.2
Alliance	M. Payne	625	31.2
Alliance	J. Hunter	590	29.4
Labour	L. Pickering	244	12.2
Labour	L. Price	186	9.3
Turnout		2,005	47.9
Registered electors		4,185	
Conservative hold			
Conservative hold			

=== Plas Newton ===
Plas Newton
Party	Candidate	Votes	%	±%
Conservative	D. Owens-Kay*	787	44.0	+13.2
Labour	M. Price	527	29.4	–13.7
Alliance	L. Hollins	517	28.7	+16.4
Majority		260	14.5	N/A
Turnout		1,831	44.7	+1.0
Registered electors		4,016		
Conservative hold		Swing	▲13.5	

=== Sealand ===
Sealand
Party	Candidate	Votes	%	±%
Conservative	M. Edwards	676	37.5	–6.5
Labour	D. Southall	609	33.8	–22.2
Alliance	L. Hollins	517	28.7	N/A
Majority		67	3.7	N/A
Turnout		1,802	46.8	+10.2
Registered electors		3,865		
Conservative hold		Swing	▲7.9	

=== Tarvin ===
Tarvin
Party	Candidate	Votes	%	±%
Conservative	S. Richards	953	65.4	–8.9
Alliance	R. Hesketh	293	20.1	N/A
Labour	N. Winterton	211	14.5	–11.2
Majority		660	45.3	N/A
Turnout		1,457	47.6	–32.1
Registered electors		3,076		
Conservative hold				

=== Tilston ===
Tilston
Party	Candidate	Votes	%	±%
Conservative	W. Hough*	462	70.2	N/A
Alliance	B. Moore	149	22.6	N/A
Labour	N. Winterton	47	7.1	N/A
Majority		313	47.6	N/A
Turnout		658	52.3	N/A
Registered electors		1,260		
Conservative hold				

=== Upton Grange ===
Upton Grange
Party	Candidate	Votes	%	±%
Conservative	J. Ross*	845	62.6	+2.9
Alliance	J. Dutton	320	23.7	+4.6
Labour	P. Swales	185	13.7	–7.5
Majority		525	38.9	+0.4
Turnout		1,350	38.4	+5.5
Registered electors		3,558		
Conservative hold		Swing	▼0.9	

=== Upton Heath ===
Upton Heath
Party	Candidate	Votes	%
Conservative	E. Gerrard	946	43.6
Conservative	G. Houlbrook	916	42.2
Labour	C. Jones	633	29.2
Alliance	P. Lowry	566	26.1
Labour	R. Smith	550	25.3
Alliance	C. Bain	527	24.3
Turnout		2,170	49.1
Registered electors		4,419	
Conservative gain from Residents			
Conservative hold			

=== Vicars Cross ===
Vicars Cross
Party	Candidate	Votes	%	±%
Alliance	G. Proctor	1,196	59.9	+49.6
Conservative	P. Thompson*	622	31.2	–9.4
Labour	R. Champion	178	8.9	–6.0
Majority		574	28.8	N/A
Turnout		1,996	46.1	+1.8
Registered electors		4,344		
Alliance gain from Conservative		Swing	▲29.5	

=== Westminster ===
Westminster
Party	Candidate	Votes	%	±%
Conservative	R. Lowe*	979	51.6	–1.8
Labour	G. Booth	462	24.3	–7.5
Alliance	S. Fraser	458	24.1	+11.5
Majority		517	27.2	+5.5
Turnout		1,899	40.7	–0.7
Registered electors		4,676		
Conservative hold		Swing	▲2.9	
