= 1988 Chester City Council election =

1988 English local election

← 1987	5 May 1988	1990 →

21 out of 60 seats to Chester City Council 31 seats needed for a majority

	First party	Second party
Party	Conservative	Labour
Last election	30 seats, 37.3%	18 seats, 31.1%
Seats won	11	8
Seats after	30	19
Seat change	Steady	▲1
Popular vote	15,051	15,033
Percentage	41.8%	41.8%
Swing	▲4.5%	▲10.7%
	Third party	Fourth party
Party	SLD	Independent
Last election	11 seats, 29.2%	1 seat, 2.2%
Seats won	2	0
Seats after	10	1
Seat change	▼1	Steady
Popular vote	4,922	609
Percentage	13.7%	1.7%
Swing	▼15.5%	▼0.5%
- Winner of each seat at the 1988 Chester City Council election
Council control before election
No overall control
Council control after election
No overall control

The 1988 Chester City Council election took place on 5 May 1988 to elect members of Chester City Council in Cheshire, England. This was on the same day as other local elections.

== Summary ==
=== Election result ===
1988 Chester City Council election
Party	This election			Full council			This election		
Party	Seats	Net	Seats %	Other	Total	Total %	Votes	Votes %	+/−
Conservative	11	Steady	52.4	19	30	50.0	15,051	41.8	+4.5
Labour	8	▲1	38.1	11	19	31.7	15,033	41.8	+10.7
SLD	2	▼1	9.5	8	10	16.7	4,922	13.7	–15.5
Independent	0	Steady	0.0	1	1	1.7	609	1.7	–0.5
SDP	0	Steady	0.0	0	0	0.0	248	0.7	N/A
Ratepayer	0	Steady	0.0	0	0	0.0	123	0.3	N/A

== Ward results ==
=== Blacon Hall ===
Blacon Hall
Party	Candidate	Votes	%	±%
Labour	J. Randall	1,292	84.3	+16.1
Conservative	L. Needham	241	15.7	–3.1
Majority		1,051	68.6	+19.2
Turnout		1,533	34.8	–2.9
Registered electors		4,400		
Labour hold		Swing	▲9.6	

=== Boughton ===
Boughton
Party	Candidate	Votes	%	±%
Labour	D. Robinson*	1,042	72.0	+18.3
Conservative	L. Aitchison	406	28.0	–2.1
Majority		636	44.0	N/A
Turnout		1,448	57.2	–3.6
Registered electors		2,531		
Labour hold		Swing	▲10.2	

=== Christleton ===
Christleton (2 seats due to by-election)
Party	Candidate	Votes	%	±%
Conservative	B. Bailey*	1,157	71.3	+5.8
Conservative	S. Begbie	1,154	71.1	+5.3
Labour	S. Murphy	481	29.6	+12.3
Labour	J. Baker	452	27.8	+10.5
Turnout		1,623	43.0	+0.9
Registered electors		3,774		
Conservative hold				
Conservative hold				

=== College ===
College
Party	Candidate	Votes	%	±%
Labour	C. Russell*	1,390	65.9	+14.1
Conservative	R. Sadler	595	28.2	–0.9
Ratepayer	D. Taylor	123	5.8	+0.6
Majority		795	37.7	+15.0
Turnout		2,108	46.3	–2.1
Registered electors		4,555		
Labour hold		Swing	▲7.5	

=== Curzon ===
Curzon
Party	Candidate	Votes	%	±%
Labour	B. Jones	1,079	52.7	+10.0
Conservative	L. Parkes	969	47.3	+12.2
Majority		110	5.4	–2.2
Turnout		2,048	66.0	+9.9
Registered electors		3,101		
Labour gain from Conservative		Swing	▼1.1	

=== Dee Point ===
Dee Point
Party	Candidate	Votes	%	±%
Labour	J. Fetherston	1,312	78.7	+15.8
Conservative	P. Harris	355	21.3	+1.5
Majority		957	57.4	N/A
Turnout		1,667	39.7	–1.2
Registered electors		4,568		
Labour hold		Swing	▲7.2	

=== Farndon ===
Farndon
Party	Candidate	Votes	%	±%
Conservative	S. Rowlandson	494	73.6	–8.3
Labour	J. Brailsford	177	26.4	+8.3
Majority		317	47.2	–16.7
Turnout		671	39.7	+0.2
Registered electors		1,692		
Conservative hold		Swing	▼8.3	

=== Grosvenor ===
Grosvenor
Party	Candidate	Votes	%	±%
Conservative	D. Pritchard	1,215	53.2	+6.9
Labour	D. Dowswell	1,068	46.8	+13.6
Majority		147	6.4	–6.7
Turnout		2,283	51.3	–5.3
Registered electors		4,450		
Conservative hold		Swing	▼3.4	

=== Hoole ===
Hoole
Party	Candidate	Votes	%	±%
SLD	R. Stunell*	1,115	50.6	+5.0
Labour	S. Hesketh	769	34.9	–2.2
Conservative	V. Holding	318	14.4	–2.9
Majority		346	15.7	+7.2
Turnout		2,202	51.3	–1.8
Registered electors		4,291		
SLD hold		Swing	▲3.6	

=== Malpas ===
Malpas
Party	Candidate	Votes	%	±%
Conservative	B. Hassall*	663	52.1	–0.6
Independent	C. Higgie	609	47.9	+6.3
Majority		54	4.2	–6.9
Turnout		1,272	44.5	–7.1
Registered electors		2,858		
Conservative hold		Swing	▼3.5	

=== Newton ===
Newton
Party	Candidate	Votes	%	±%
Conservative	J. Ebo*	914	44.7	+1.4
SLD	M. Garrod	746	36.5	–3.6
Labour	R. Cross	385	18.8	+2.1
Majority		168	8.2	+5.0
Turnout		2,045	49.4	–5.7
Registered electors		4,142		
Conservative hold		Swing	▲2.5	

=== Plas Newton ===
Plas Newton
Party	Candidate	Votes	%	±%
Labour	H. Jones*	1,052	44.9	+8.6
SLD	M. Hale	701	29.9	–9.1
Conservative	W. Sutton	589	25.1	+0.4
Majority		351	15.0	N/A
Turnout		2,342	61.5	–2.1
Registered electors		3,806		
Labour hold		Swing	▲8.9	

=== Saughall ===
Saughall
Party	Candidate	Votes	%	±%
Conservative	A. Coughlan	910	70.1	+27.8
Labour	R. Jones	388	29.9	+17.2
Majority		522	40.2	N/A
Turnout		1,298	43.7	–3.2
Registered electors		2,967		
Conservative gain from SLD		Swing	▲5.3	

=== Sealand ===
Sealand
Party	Candidate	Votes	%	±%
Labour	R. Bott*	1,189	74.3	+12.4
Conservative	B. Eaves	411	25.7	–0.6
Majority		778	48.6	+13.0
Turnout		1,600	43.5	–6.4
Registered electors		3,678		
Labour hold		Swing	▲6.5	

=== Tattenhall ===
Tattenhall
Party	Candidate	Votes	%	±%
Conservative	F. Pierce*	611	71.6	N/A
Labour	J. Starkey	242	28.4	N/A
Majority		369	43.3	N/A
Turnout		853	33.3	–9.8
Registered electors		2,561		
Conservative hold				

=== Upton Grange ===
Upton Grange
Party	Candidate	Votes	%	±%
Conservative	J. Butler*	681	43.7	+6.1
SLD	L. O'Sullivan	641	41.1	–11.2
Labour	S. Taylor	238	15.3	+5.2
Majority		40	2.6	N/A
Turnout		1,560	50.7	–1.2
Registered electors		3,077		
Conservative hold		Swing	▲8.7	

=== Upton Heath ===
Upton Heath
Party	Candidate	Votes	%	±%
Labour	R. Griffiths*	1,209	48.9	+14.8
Conservative	J. Snell	1,003	40.6	–0.7
SLD	C. Bain	259	10.5	–14.1
Majority		206	8.3	N/A
Turnout		2,471	59.3	–2.6
Registered electors		4,167		
Labour hold		Swing	▲7.8	

=== Vicars Cross ===
Vicars Cross
Party	Candidate	Votes	%	±%
SLD	K. Holding*	1,107	52.4	–2.8
Conservative	P. Thompson	680	32.2	+2.3
Labour	D. Halley	327	15.5	+0.6
Majority		427	20.2	–5.0
Turnout		2,114	49.5	–7.0
Registered electors		4,269		
SLD hold		Swing	▼2.6	

=== Waverton ===
Waverton
Party	Candidate	Votes	%	±%
Conservative	J. Bramall*	366	44.7	–18.1
SLD	C. Walley	353	43.1	+29.8
Labour	K. Bird	100	12.2	–11.6
Majority		13	1.6	–21.8
Turnout		819	56.2	+5.5
Registered electors		1,457		
Conservative hold		Swing	▼24.0	

=== Westminster ===
Westminster
Party	Candidate	Votes	%	±%
Conservative	R. Short*	1,319	54.8	+3.1
Labour	P. Byrne	841	34.9	+5.8
SDP	S. Barlow	248	10.3	N/A
Majority		478	19.9	–2.7
Turnout		2,408	50.7	–5.0
Registered electors		4,748		
Conservative hold		Swing	▼1.4	
