= St. Chad's =

St. Chad's may refer to several things, many of which were named for St Chad of Mercia:

== Places ==
- St. Chad's, Newfoundland and Labrador, Canada

== Religious institutions in England and Wales ==
- St Chad's Chapel, Tushingham, Cheshire
- St. Chad's Church (disambiguation)
- St. Chad's Cathedral, Birmingham
- Lichfield Cathedral, also known as the Cathedral Church of the Blessed Virgin Mary & St Chad

== Educational institutions in England ==
- St Chad's College of the University of Durham
  - St Chad's College Boat Club, the college boat club
- St Chad's R.C Primary School, Manchester
- St Chad's R.C Primary School (Sedgley), West Midlands

== Other ==
- Lichfield Gospels, also known as St Chad's gospels, a Gospel Book in Lichfield Cathedral
- St Chads tram stop, Birmingham, England
