= St. Chad's Church =

St Chad's Church may refer to:

- St Chad's Church, Bensham, Gateshead, Tyne and Wear
- St Chad's Church, Burton-on-Trent, Staffordshire
- St Chad's Church, Chadwell Heath, London
- St Chad's Church, Claughton, Lancashire
- St Chad's Church, Far Headingley, West Yorkshire
- St Chad's Church, Farndon, Cheshire
- St Chad's Church, Haggerston, London
- St Chad's Church, Holt, Wales
- St Chad's Church, Hopwas, Staffordshire
- St Chad's Church, Kirkby, Merseyside
- Church of St Chad, Middlesmoor, North Yorkshire
- St Chad's Church, Over, Cheshire
- St Chad's Church, Poulton-le-Fylde, Lancashire
- St Chad's Church, Rochdale, Greater Manchester
- St Chad's Church, Sedgley, Dudley, West Midlands
- St Chad's Church, Shrewsbury, Shropshire
- St Chad's Church, Stafford, Staffordshire
- St Chad's Church, Tushingham, Cheshire
- Church of St Chad, Uppermill, Greater Manchester
- St Chad's Church, Wybunbury, Cheshire
- St Chad's Church, York

== See also ==
- St Chad's Cathedral, Birmingham
- St Chad's Chapel, Tushingham, Cheshire
- St Chad's College, Durham University
