= Listed buildings of Malpas, Cheshire =

Malpas, Cheshire, has many listed buildings; part of the town is in a Conservation area. There is one building at Grade I, one at Grade II*, two gateways are also Grade II*, and many more buildings are Grade II.

== Grade I ==
- Church of Saint Oswald, Church Street
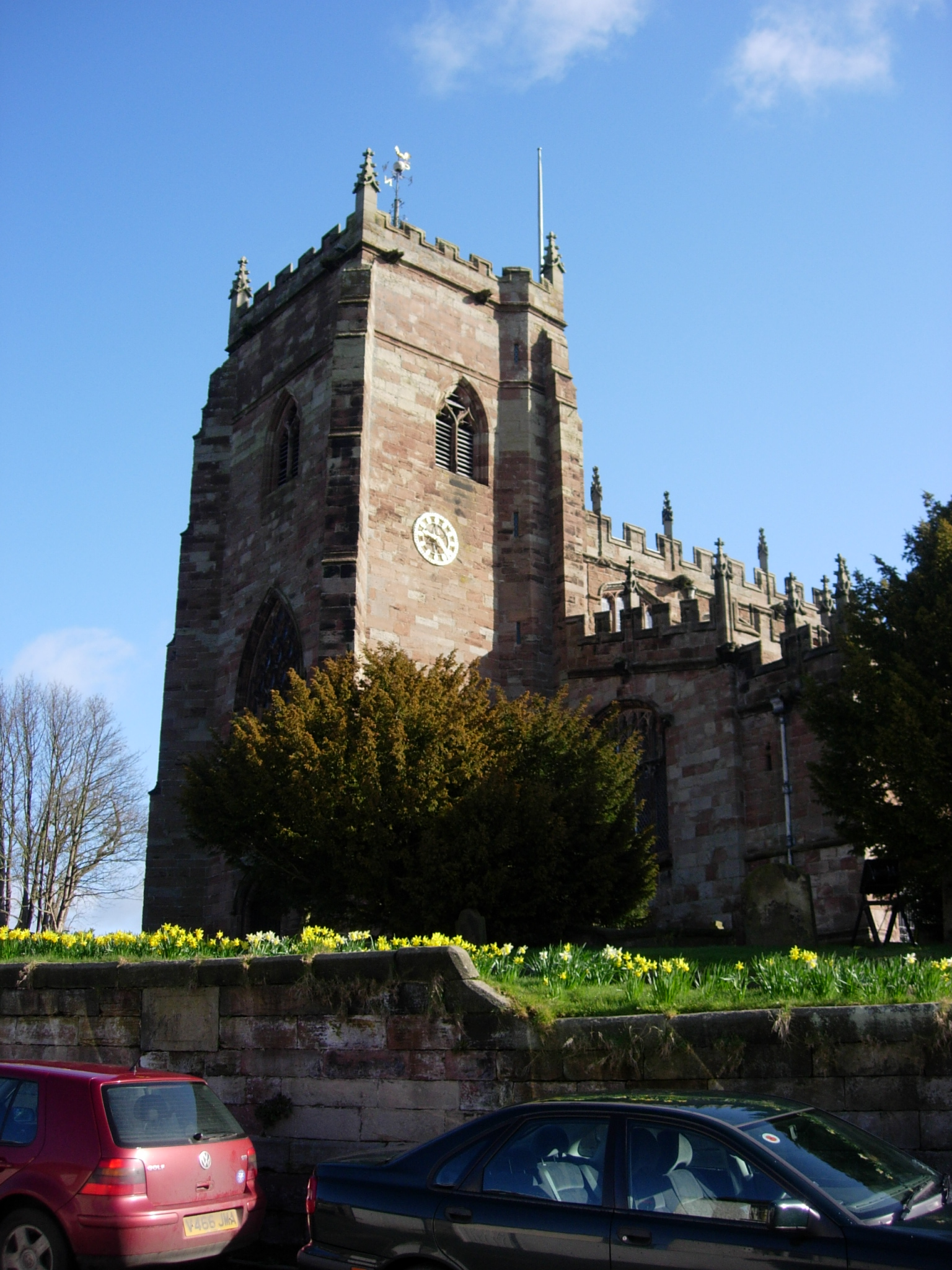
St Oswald's Church from the SW

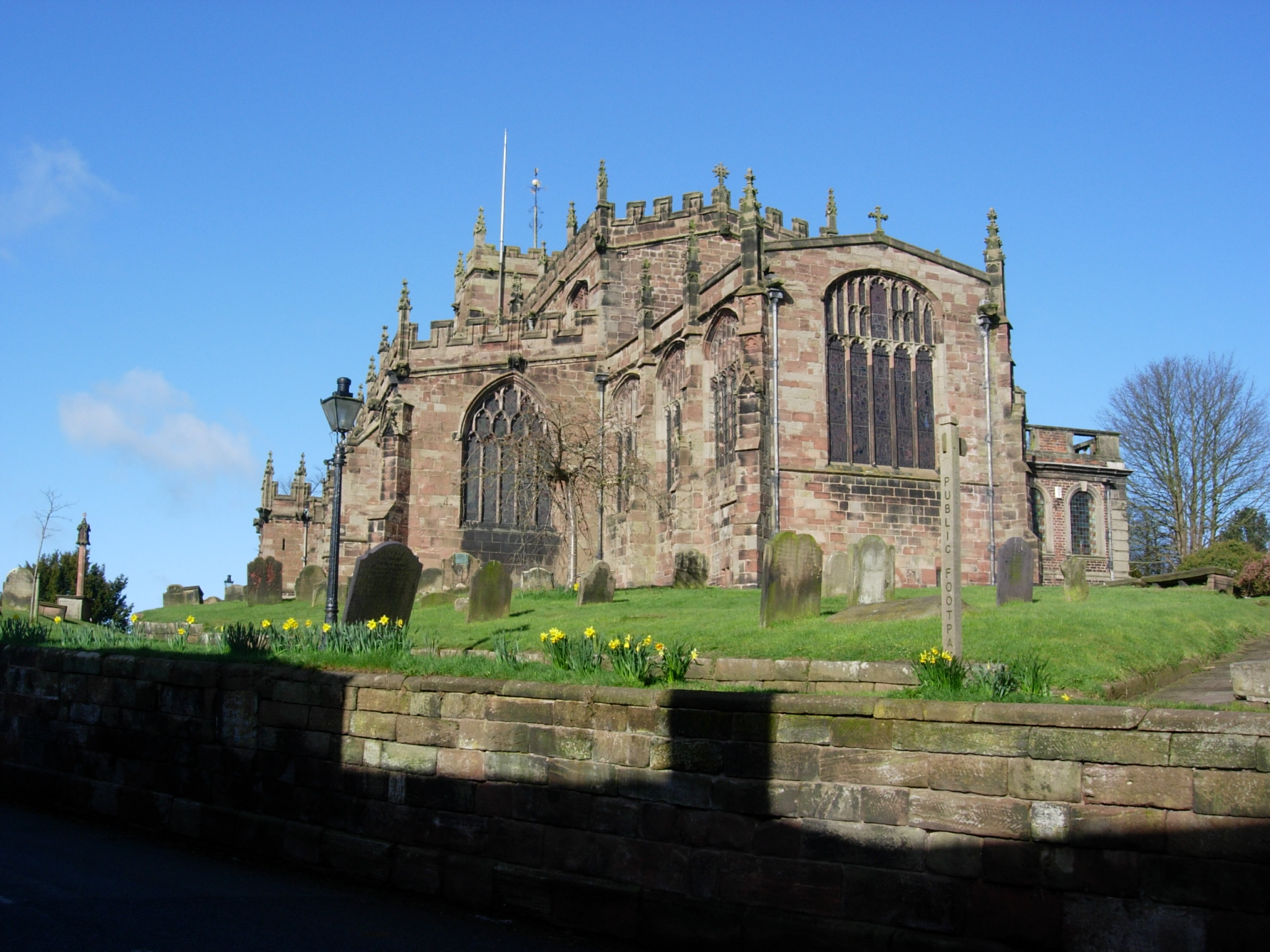
St Oswald's Church from the SE

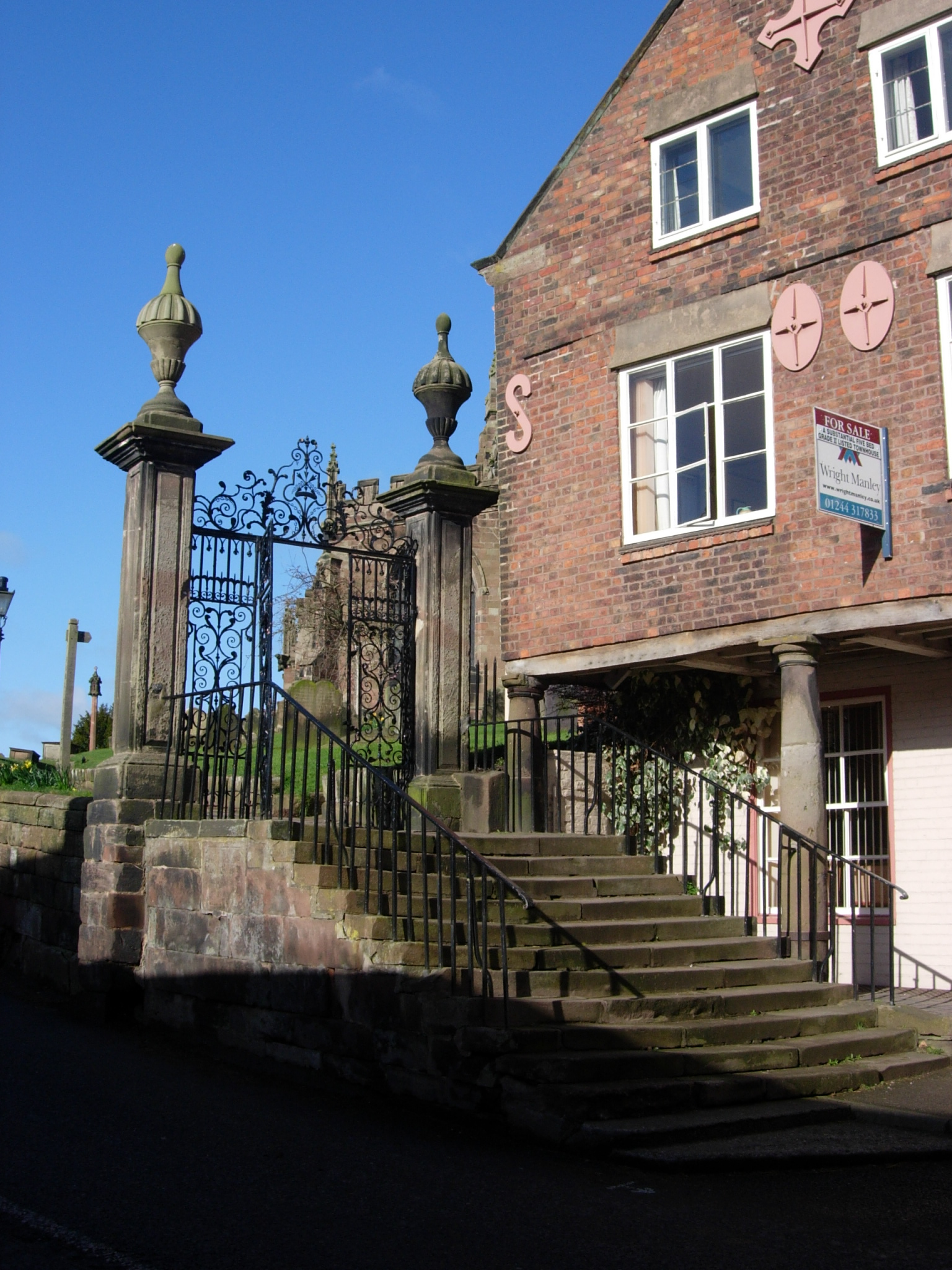
St Oswald's Church, gates from the SE

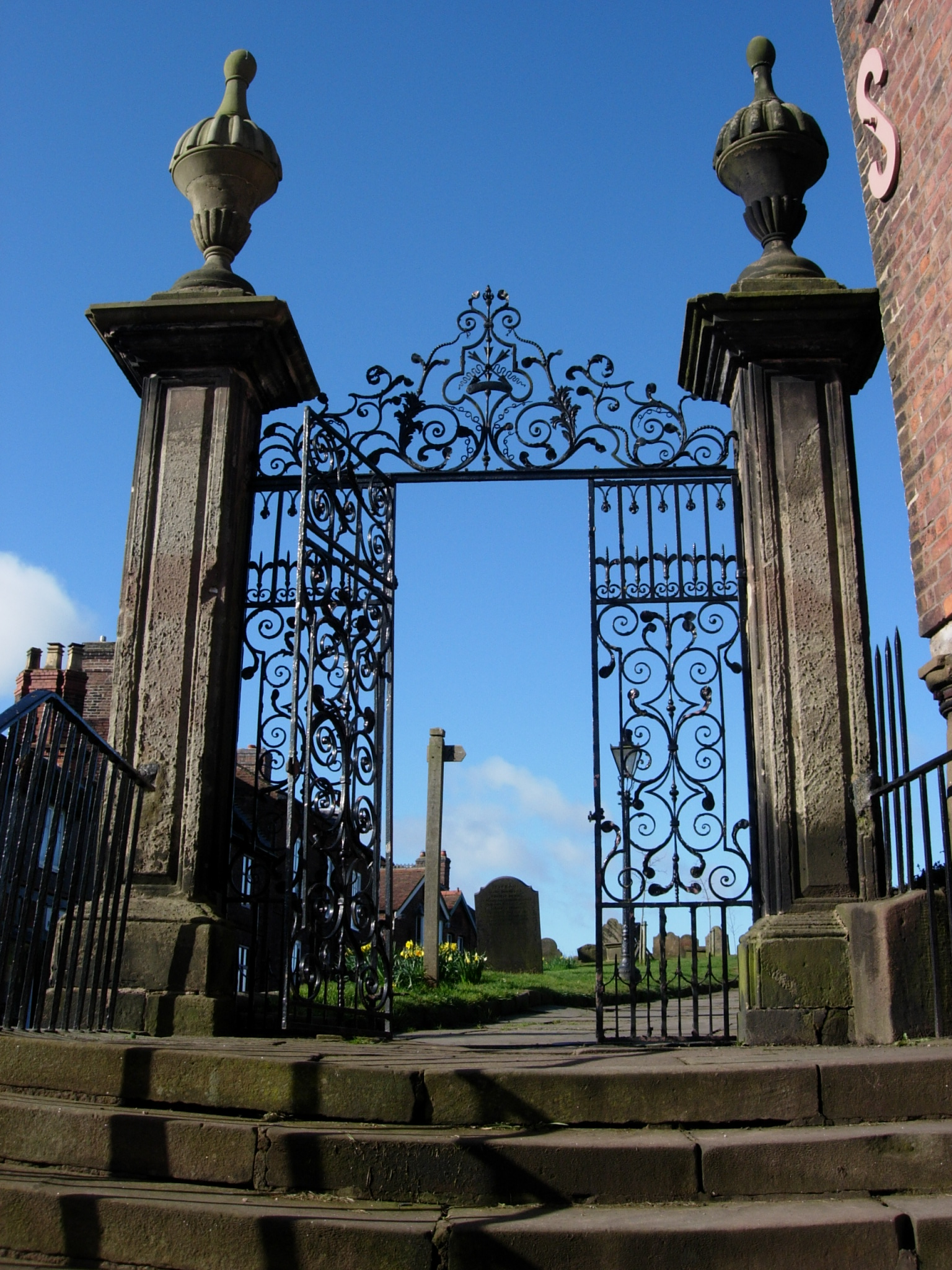
St Oswald's Church, detail of gate from the SE

== Grade II* ==
- The Old Printing House, Church Street, according to English Heritage, is an 'unusual classical treatment of a small building'. It was built on a sandstone bedrock plinth in 1733. It was listed as Grade II* in 1952. The front gable carries a stone depicting the Cholmondeley Griffin. In the Cheshire volume of The Buildings of England, Nikolaus Pevsner notes it as "dated 1733 but is in the style of the late C17".
- Gates, South East corner of Saint Oswald's churchyard
- Gates, South West corner of Saint Oswald's churchyard

== Grade II ==
- The Cross, Malpas

Victorian neo-gothic upper with medieval octagonal steps.

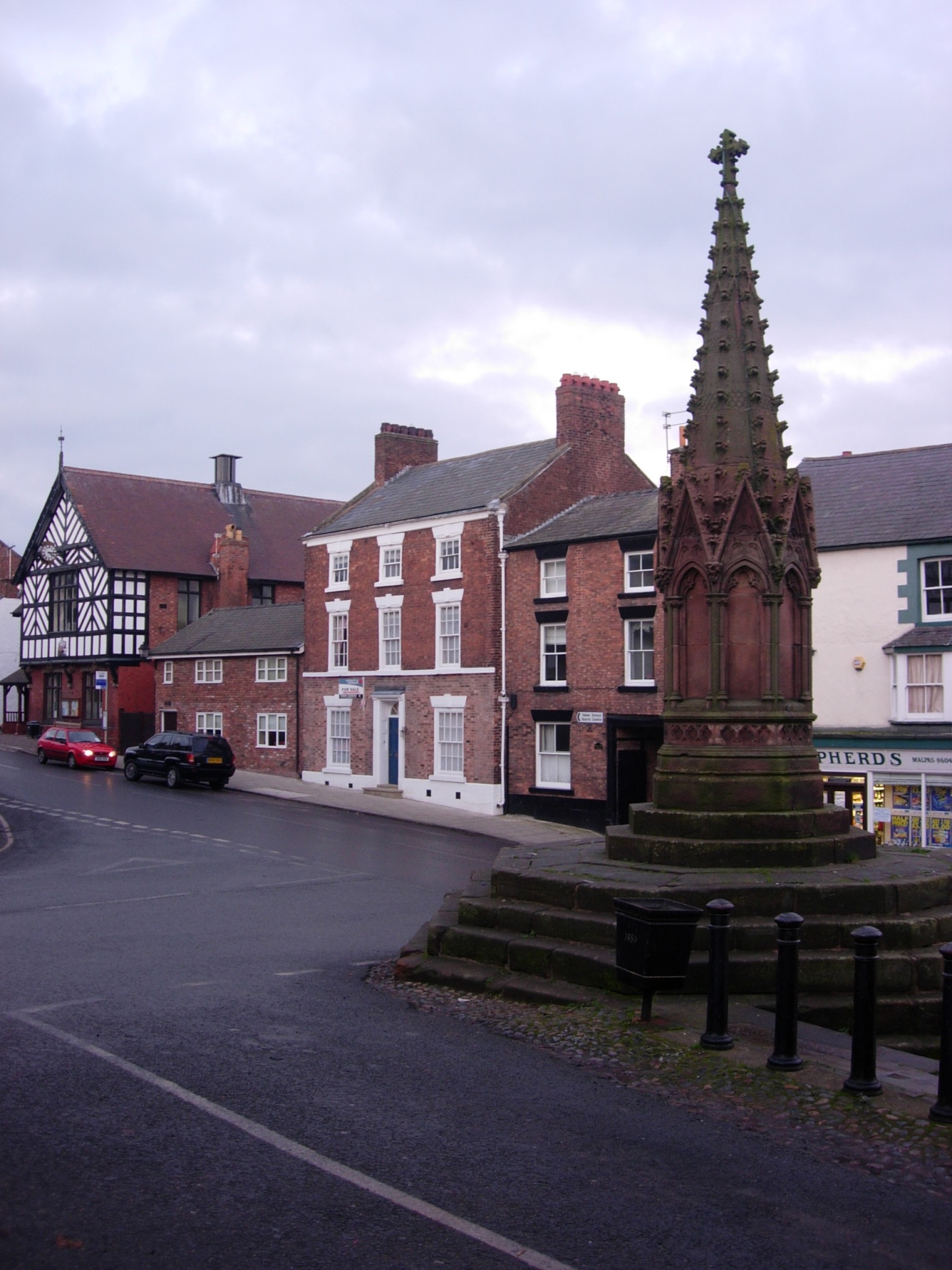
The Cross, Malpas
- 1 Church Street, Malpas Is opposite the Market Cross. Built of irregular bond brown brick with a grey slate roof, it has a probably late C18 exterior and earlier interior.
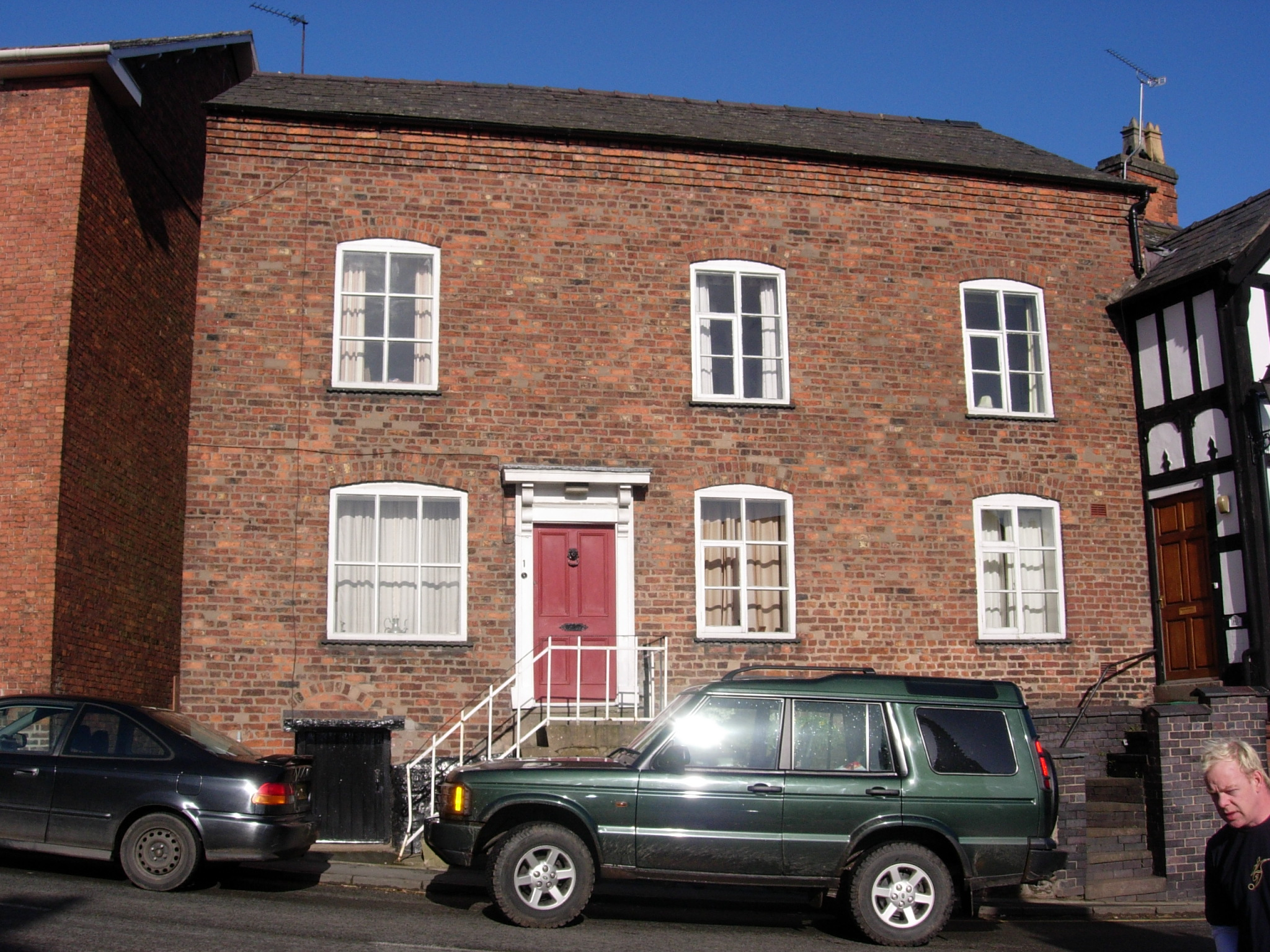
1 Church Street, Malpas
- 3 and 5 Church Street
- 14 Church Street
- The Wyvern (Wycherleys), Church Street, Originally a coaching hotel constructed in the C18. Many alterations have occurred since. It was listed as Grade II on 22 October 1952.
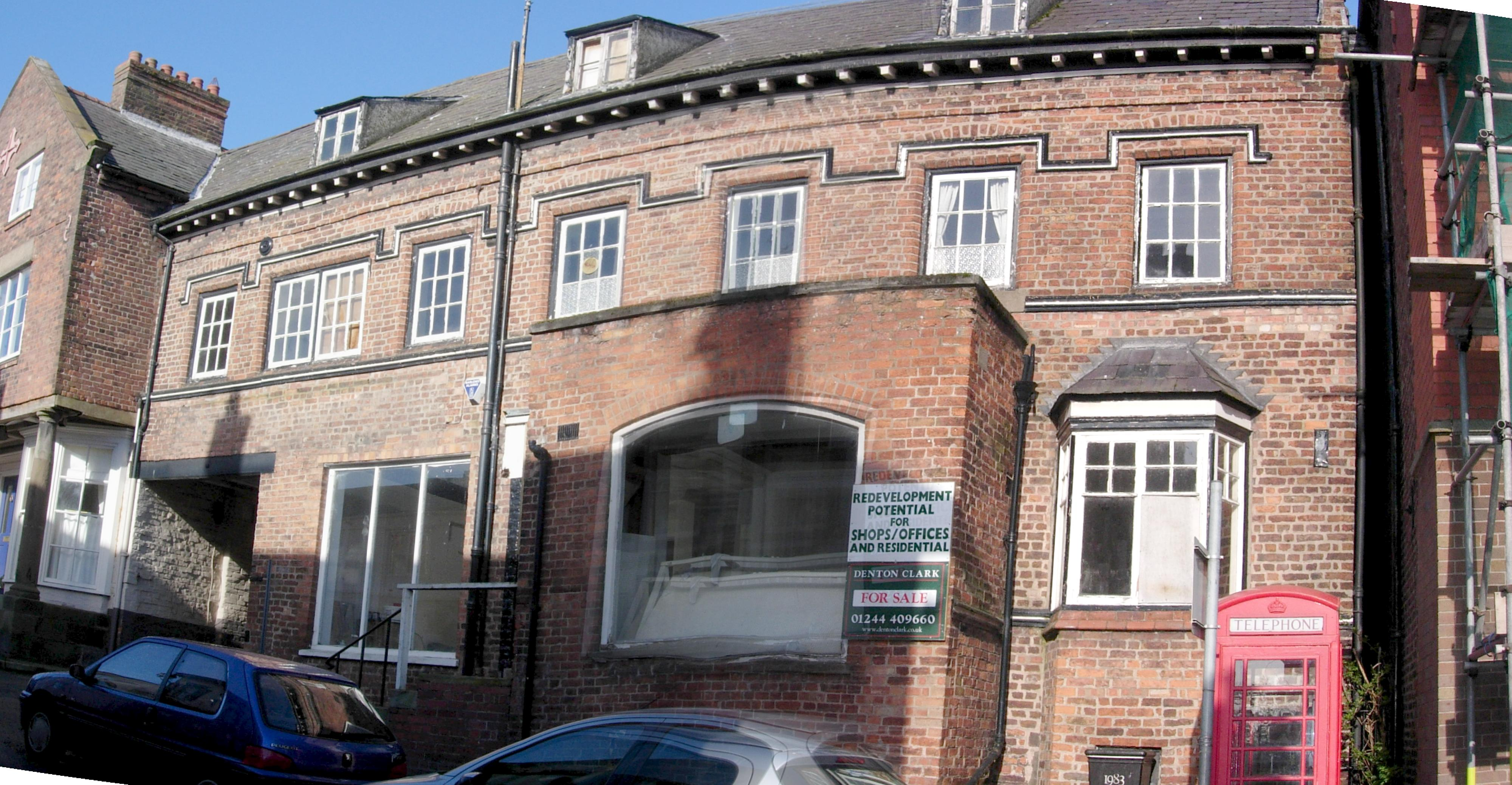
The Wyvern (Wycherleys)
- Market Place, 2 Church Street, Late C17 and early C18 with a colonnade of 8 Tuscan pillars of red sandstone.
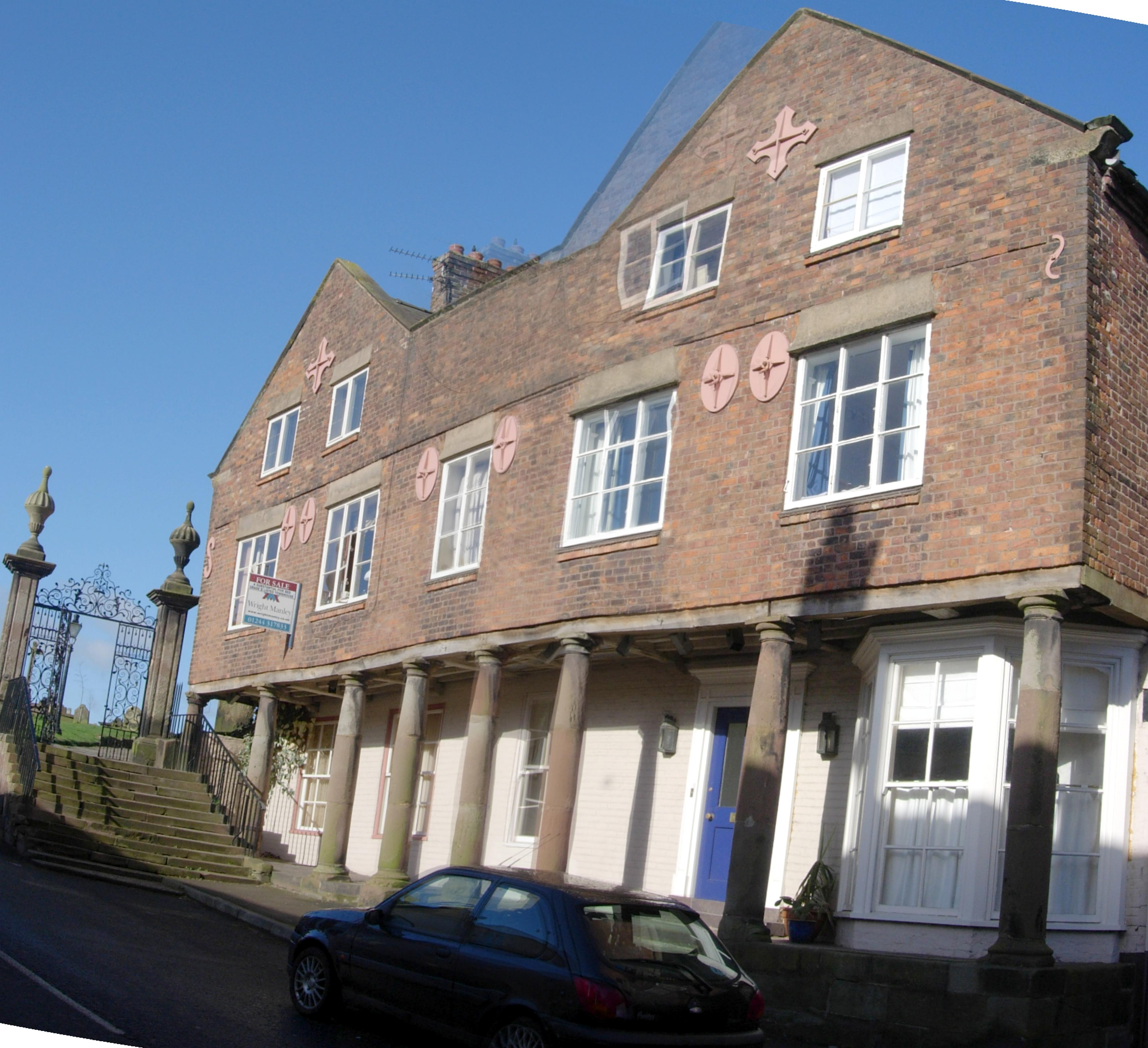
The Market House
- 21 Church Street
- Church View, Church Street
- Churchyard wall between South East Gates and Motte, Church Street
- Churchyard wall to Church Street, Church Street
- Cobblestones, Church Street
- Duncall table tomb, 10 metres South of East bay of nave of St Oswald's Church, Church Street (North side)
- Gate piers and flight of steps to west gateway to churchyard, Church Street
- Gates, gate piers and steps at South West corner of Churchyard, Church Street
- Georgian House (formerly Ivy Cottage), with plinth and railings to garden, Church Street
- Glebe Cottage, Church Street
- Hopley headstone South of nave of church, Church Street
- Red telephone box by Lloyds Bank, Church Street
- Sundial pedestal in churchyard 5 metres South West of porch, Church Street
- The Bolling, with garden wall to left, Church Street
- The Gates, Church Street
- The Rectory, Church Street
- The Sanvern, Church Street
- Tithe Barn, Church Street
- Tomb of John Bassett, circa 8 metres north of West bay of nave of church of St Oswald, Church Street
- Walls to sunken paths in churchyard, South of church, Church Street
- Guidepost at Ebnal Lane
- Brose Lake Farmhouse, Greenway Lane
- 11 High Street
- Alport Cottage, High Street
- Alport House, High Street
- Chester Villa, High Street
- Drake's Cottage and Drakes House, with walls to front gardens, High Street
- Ivy Cottage, High Street
- Malpas High Street Church (United Reformed/Methodist), High Street
- Malpas Post Office, High Street
- Prospect House, High Street
- Rock House with retaining wall and steps, High Street
- The Old School House, High Street
- Woodville, with walls to yard to right, High Street
- Bank Cottage, Old Hall Street
- Tudor Cottage, Old Hall Street
- White Cottage, Old Hall Street
- Ebnal Old Hall
- Bridge to South of Overton Hall, Overton Heath
- Gate piers to South of Overton Manor, Overton Heath
- Overton Hall, Overton Heath
- Overton Manor, Overton Heath

== See also ==
- Listed buildings in Bradley
- Listed buildings in Chorlton
- Listed buildings in Cuddington
- Listed buildings in Hampton
- Listed buildings in Overton
- Listed buildings in Shocklach Oviatt
- Listed buildings in Threapwood
- Listed buildings in Tilston
- Listed buildings in Tushingham cum Grindley
- Listed buildings in Wigland
