= St Chad's Church, Tushingham =

Coordinates: 53.0131°N 2.7134°W

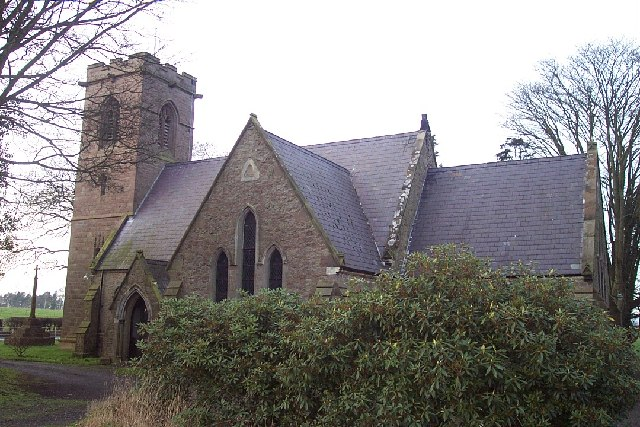
- St Chad's Church, Tushingham, from the south

- Location in Cheshire
- OS grid reference: SJ 522 464
- Location: Chester Road, Tushingham, Cheshire
- Country: England
- Denomination: Anglican
- Website: St Chad, Tushingham

History
- Status: Parish church
- Dedication: Saint Chad

Architecture
- Functional status: Active
- Heritage designation: Grade II
- Designated: 1 March 1967
- Architect(s): Robert Jennings; Hodgson Fowler
- Architectural type: Church
- Style: Gothic Revival
- Groundbreaking: 1860
- Completed: 1863

Specifications
- Materials: Sandstone, slate roofs

Administration
- Province: York
- Diocese: Chester
- Archdeaconry: Chester
- Deanery: Malpas
- Parish: St Chad, Tushingham

Clergy
- Vicar: Revd Veronica Green

St Chad's Church is on Chester Road (the A41) in the civil parish of Tushingham-cum-Grindley, Macefen and Bradley, Cheshire, England. It is an active Anglican parish church in the deanery of Malpas, the archdeaconry of Chester, and the diocese of Chester. Its benefice is combined with those of St Michael, Marbury, and St Mary, Whitewell. The church is recorded in the National Heritage List for England as a designated Grade II listed building.

== History ==
St Chad's was built between 1860 and 1863 to a design by Robert Jennings of Atherstone, and the tower was added in 1897 by Hodgson Fowler. The building replaced the functions of the earlier St Chad's Chapel, also known as Old St Chad's, which is still extant and consecrated. The chapel is among fields about 500 metres (0.3 mi) to the southwest of the newer church, and retains the only burial ground in the (former) parish of Tushingham.

== Architecture ==
The church is constructed in red sandstone with grey slate roofs. Its plan is cruciform, and consists of a three-bay nave with a south porch, single-bay transepts, a two-bay chancel, a sacristy in the corner of the chancel and the north transept, and a west tower. The tower has three stages in Perpendicular style, with an octagonal northwest stair turret, and a crenelated parapet. In the bottom stage is a three-light west window and a statue of Saint Chad in a niche, single-light trefoil-headed windows on the north and south sides of the middle stage, and two-light bell openings in the top stage. The body of the church is in Early English style with lancet windows.

The interior of the church is plastered, with dressings in stone. The west tower acts as a baptistry and contains an octagonal font. The stained glass in the west window (dated 1897) and in the north transept (dated 1904) is by Kempe. There is a ring of six bells, all cast by John Taylor & Co in 1897.

== See also ==
- Listed buildings in Tushingham cum Grindley
