= Tushingham Hall =

Country house in Tushingham, Cheshire, England

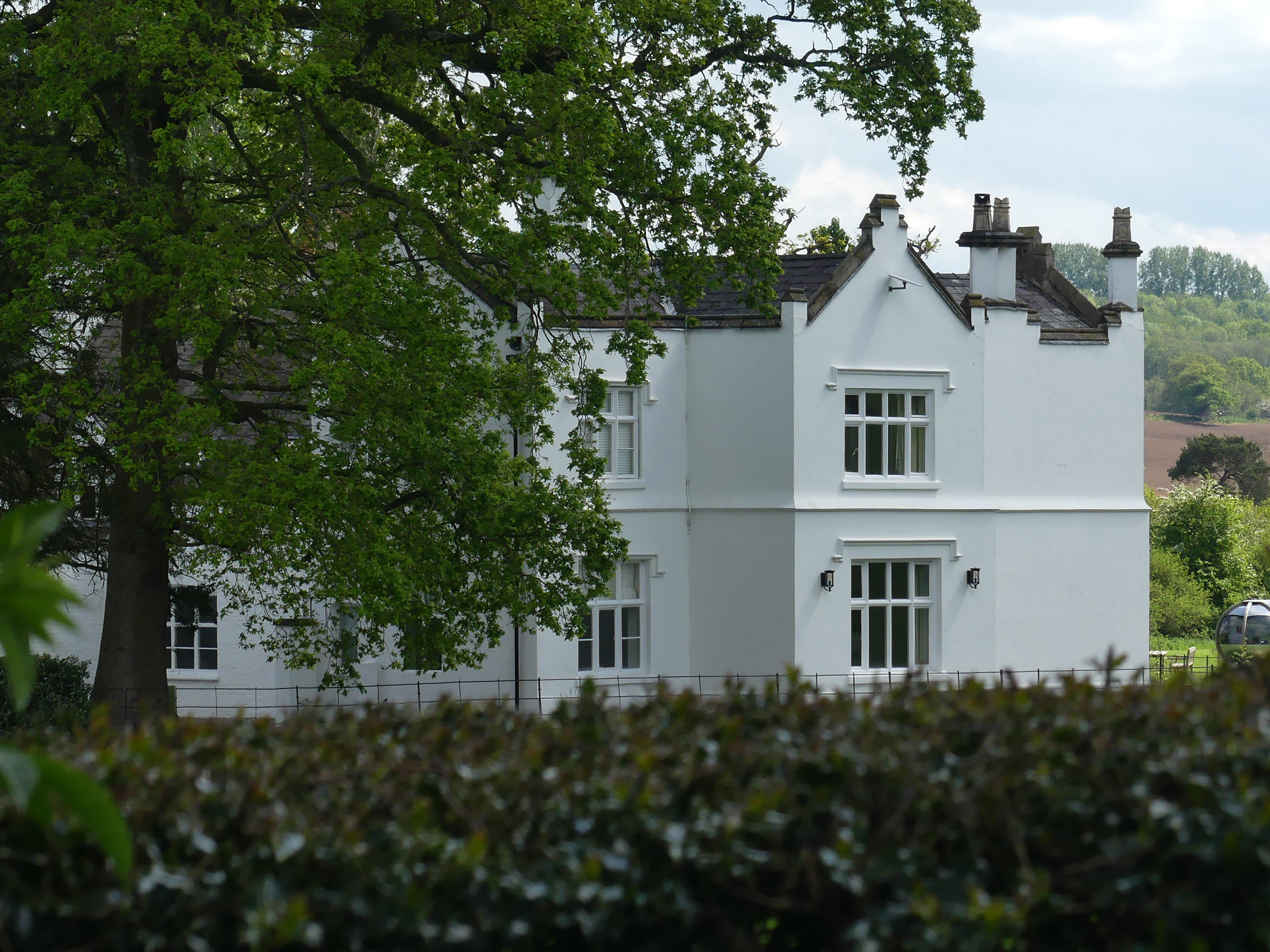
- West front
- Interactive map of Tushingham Hall
- Type: Country house
- Location: Tushingham
- Coordinates: 53.00076°N 2.70275°W
- Area: Cheshire
- Built: Early 19th century
- Architectural style: Tudor Revival

Listed Building – Grade II
- Official name: Tushingham Hall
- Designated: 22 October 1952
- Reference no.: 1136762

Tushingham Hall is a country house in Tushingham, Cheshire, England. Formerly a moated farmhouse, it was remodelled in the early 19th century for Daniel Vawdrey, retaining many 17th-century features. It is constructed in rendered brick with slate roofs. Its architectural style is Tudor Revival. The house is in two storeys with a symmetrical entrance front. The centre of the front is recessed and contains a canted open porch with three Tudor arches. Above this is a mullioned window containing two sashes. On each side is a similar window in both storeys, those in the upper storey being smaller than those below. Above the window over the porch is a shaped gable containing a wreath, and the rest of the front is crenellated. The interior contains a 17th-century staircase originally in Dearnford Hall, Staffordshire. The house is recorded in the National Heritage List for England as a designated Grade II listed building.

== See also ==
- Listed buildings in Tushingham cum Grindley
