= Listed buildings in Tushingham cum Grindley =

Tushingham cum Grindley is a former civil parish, now in the parish of Tushingham-cum-Grindley, Macefen and Bradley, in Cheshire West and Chester, England. It contains 15 buildings that are recorded in the National Heritage List for England as designated listed buildings. Of these, one is listed at Grade I, the highest of the three grades, and the others are at Grade II, the lowest grade. The parish is entirely rural, and the listed buildings are mainly houses, churches, farms, and associated structures. The Llangollen Canal runs through the parish, and two structures associated with the canal are also listed.

== Key ==
Grade	Criteria
I	Buildings of exceptional interest, sometimes considered to be internationally important
II	Buildings of national importance and special interest

== Buildings ==
Name and location	Photograph	Date	Notes	Grade
Pearl Farmhouse; 53.00846°N 2.70353°W		Mid-17th century (probable)	A farmhouse in timber framing partly replaced in brick with a slate roof. It is in 1½ storeys, with three casement windows in the lower storey, and two dormers above. Also on the front is a gabled porch. Inside are back-to-back inglenooks.	II
Blue Bell Inn; 53.00404°N 2.71216°W		1667	The former inn is timber-framed, partly pebbledashed, and partly in rendered brick. It has a two-storey main block and a cross-wing on the right. To the left is an early 20th-century extension with a lower storey in pebbledashed brick and a timber-framed upper floor. The roof is slated. The windows are mullioned casements.	II
Tushingham House; 52.99971°N 2.70658°W		1680	The house was remodelled in the 19th century. It is built in brick on a stone plinth, and has a slate roof. It is a symmetrical house, in three storeys, and has a double-pile plan. The central doorway has quoins, a fanlight and an entablature. Flanking it are semi-octagonal bay windows. The windows are sashes.	II
St Chad's Chapel; 53.01178°N 2.70570°W		1689–91	The chapel stands in a field and can be approached only by footpaths. It is built in brick with a slate roof, and consists of a rectangular nave, a south vestry, and a west tower with a pyramidal roof and a weathercock. An external staircase leads up to the west gallery.	I
Bell Farmhouse; 53.00367°N 2.71313°W		1765	The farmhouse is in brick on a plinth with slate roofs. It is in two storeys, and has an L-shaped plan. The farmhouse has a symmetrical front. It has a central fluted doorcase with a canopy. Most of the windows are casements.	II
Willeymoor Lock; 53.00176°N 2.69517°W		c. 1800	The lock is on the Llangollen Canal. It was designed and constructed by William Jessop and Thomas Telford. The lock is built in brick with stone copings, and has single timber gates at each end.	II
Canal stables 53.00169°N 2.69506°W	—	c. 1800	The stables are adjacent to Willeymoor Lock on the Llangollen Canal. They are timber-framed with brick infill painted white. The roof is in corrugated asbestos. Against the northeast wall are hay lofts and wooden feeding troughs.	II
High Ash Farmhouse; 52.99867°N 2.72067°W		1819 (probable)	The farmhouse is in brick on a stone plinth with a slate roof, in three storeys. A former dairy wing has been incorporated into the house. On both the entrance front and the garden front is a gabled porch and a 20th-century bow-fronted bay window. The windows are casements.	II
Farm building, High Ash Farm; 52.99882°N 2.72012°W		1819	Farm buildings in two ranges, containing a shippon, a barn, stables, a coach-house, and hay lofts. They are in brick with slate roofs. The west wing is in two storeys, the southeast wing is in three. Features include various openings, gables, diamond-shaped ventilation holes, and pitch holes. The buildings are linked to the farmhouse by a wall.	II
Farm building, Tushingham House; 53.00001°N 2.70669°W	—	1821	A group of farm buildings surrounding an open courtyard. They are in brick with slate roofs, and have two storeys. Features include openings of various sizes, a pigeon loft with flight-holes, pitch holes, gables, and sash windows.	II
Hearse house 53.01182°N 2.70592°W		1822	The hearse house stands adjacent to St Chad's Chapel. It is built in brick and has a pyramidal grey slate roof. At the west end are double doors, and on the south is a pedestrian entrance under a sandstone lintel.	II
Tushingham Hall; 53.00076°N 2.70275°W		Early 19th century	The house was remodelled, retaining some 17th-century features of an earlier house. It is built in brick with slate roofs, and is in Tudor Revival style. The house is in two storeys, it has a symmetrical stuccoed entrance front, and a central porch with a shaped gable above. The windows are sashes with mullions.	II
Barhill Farmhouse; 53.01573°N 2.70852°W	—	c. 1840	The interior retains some features from the late 17th or early 18th century. The farmhouse is built in brick with a slate roof. It is in two storeys with an attic. On the front is a Roman Doric doorcase with pilasters and an entablature. On each side of the door is a single-storey canted bay window with a parapet. Most of the windows are sashes, with small casements in the end gables. Inside the farmhouse is an inglenook.	II
St Chad's Church; 53.01315°N 2.71345°W		1860–63	The church was designed by Robert Jennings, and the tower, by Hodgson Fowler, was added in 1897. It is in sandstone with slate roofs, and has a cruciform plan. The church consists of a nave with a south porch, transepts, a chancel, a sacristy, and a west tower.	II
Hand pump 52.99998°N 2.70707°W	—	1869	The hand pump stands to the north of Tushingham House. It is in cast iron, and has a circular stem and a fluted chamber. The spout is tapering, and has a bucket-hook. At the top is a domed fluted cap with a finial.	II

== See also ==
- Listed buildings in Bradley, Cheshire
- Listed buildings in Wigland
- Listed buildings in Chidlow
- Listed buildings in Malpas
- Listed buildings in Marbury cum Quoisley
- Listed buildings in Wirswall
- Listed buildings in Whitchurch Urban
