= St Oswald's Church, Malpas =

Coordinates: 53.0195°N 2.7670°W

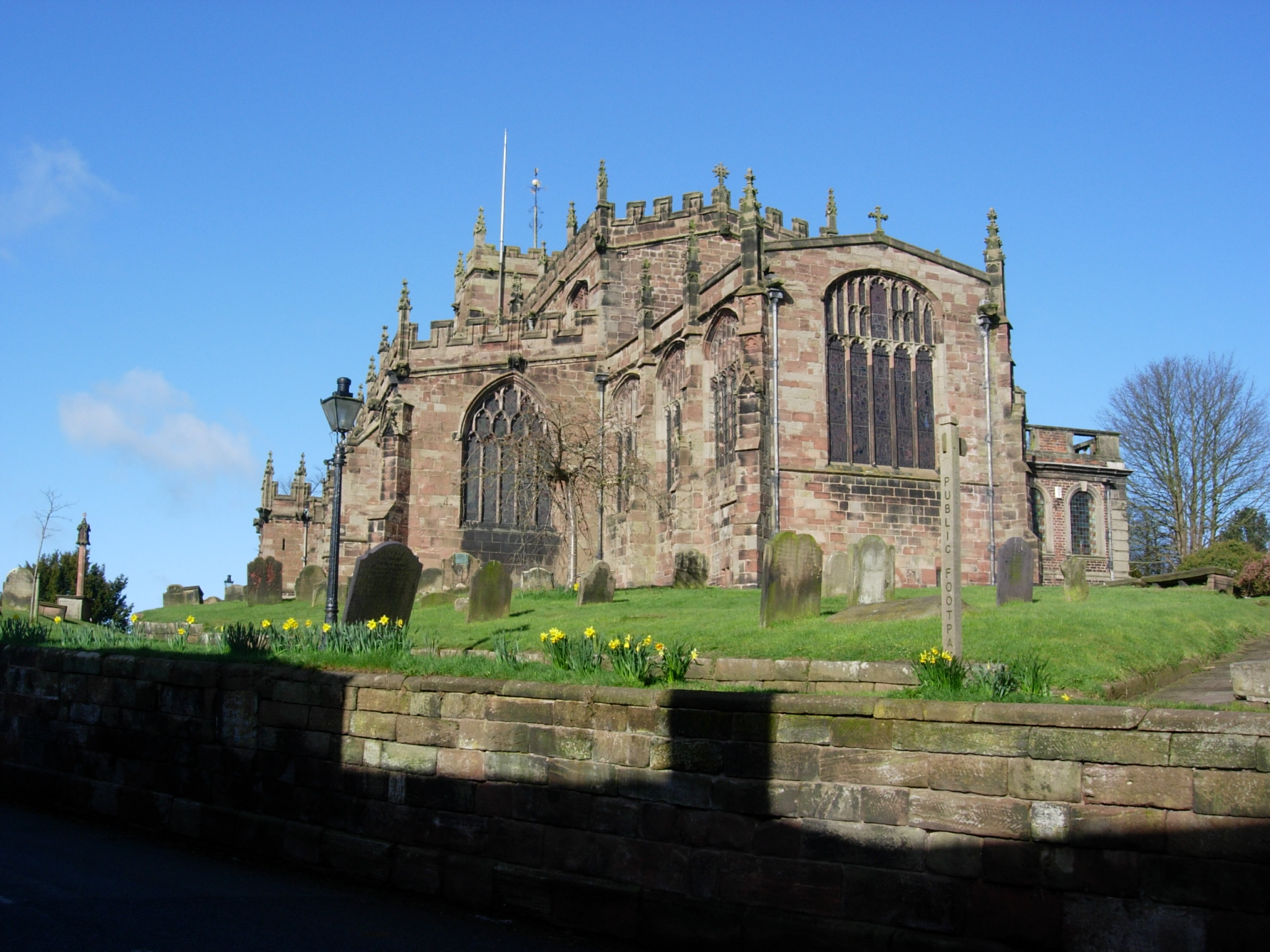
- St Oswald's Church, Malpas, from the southeast

- Location in Cheshire
- OS grid reference: SJ 485 472
- Location: Malpas, Cheshire
- Country: England
- Denomination: Anglican
- Website: St Oswald, Malpas

History
- Status: Parish church
- Dedication: Saint Oswald

Architecture
- Functional status: Active
- Heritage designation: Grade I
- Designated: 1 March 1967
- Architectural type: Church
- Style: Gothic

Specifications
- Materials: Red sandstone

Administration
- Province: York
- Diocese: Chester
- Archdeaconry: Chester
- Deanery: Malpas
- Parish: St. Oswald Malpas and St. John Threapwood

Clergy
- Rector: Revd Dr Janine Arnott

St Oswald's Church stands on the highest point in the market town of Malpas, Cheshire, England, on or near the site of a Norman motte and bailey castle. The church is recorded in the National Heritage List for England as a designated Grade I listed building and is recognised as being one of the best examples in Cheshire of a late 15th to early 16th-century church. It is an active Anglican parish church in the diocese of Chester, the archdeaconry of Chester and the deanery of Malpas. Its benefice is combined with those of St John, Threapwood, and Holy Trinity, Bickerton. Alec Clifton-Taylor includes it in his list of 'best' English parish churches.

== History ==
The church is dedicated to Saint Oswald. The present church was built in the second half of the 14th century on the site of an earlier church, although there are no structural remains of that building. The church was largely rebuilt above the cill level with the addition of a clerestory in the late 15th century. In about 1886 the Chester architect John Douglas carried out a restoration, which included removal of the box pews and plaster from its interior.

== Architecture ==
=== Exterior ===
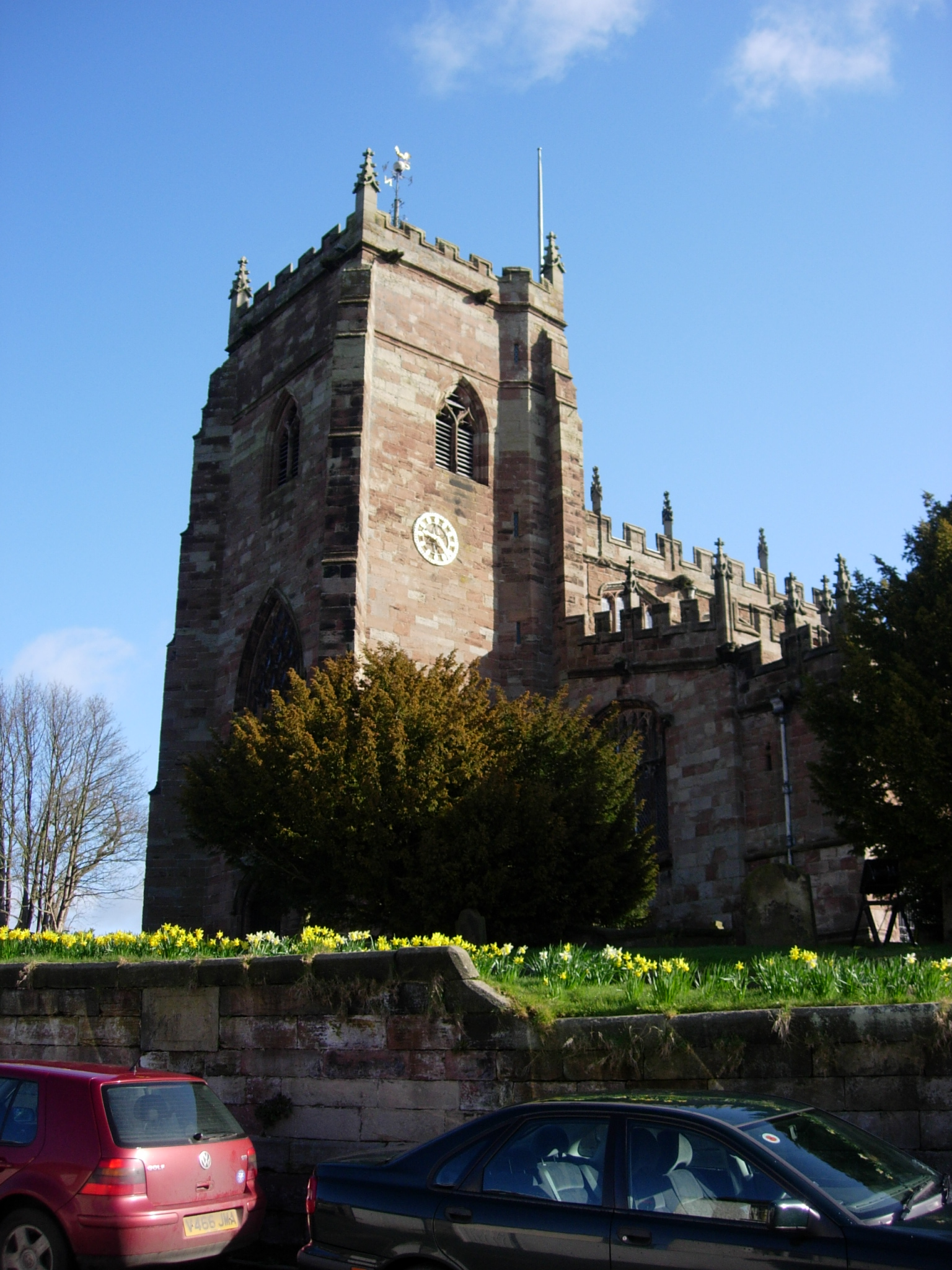
St. Oswald's Church, Malpas from the southwest

It is built in red sandstone with lead roofs. The tower dates from the 14th century and is just over 70 feet (21 m) high with diagonal west buttresses, angled east buttresses, and a southeast octagonal turret. The nave and chancel are crenellated. At the south-west corner is a porch which leads into a six-bay nave with north and south aisles. At the eastern end of each aisle is a chantry chapel, the north chapel originally belonging to the Cholmondeley family and the south chapel to the Brereton family. To the east of the nave is the three-bay chancel, and in the north-east corner is a vestry dating from 1717. Above the south porch is a parvise and above the doorway is a wall sundial with niches on either side. The porch is embattled, with pinnacles and gargoyles.

=== Interior ===
Within the nave is an oak chest dating from the second half of the 13th century. The octagonal font is from the 15th century and it has an oak cover made in 1627. The pews date from the 1880s but some of the original box pews from the Brereton chapel are now at the back of the south aisle. The nave ceiling is constructed with camber beams and it has bosses and carved angels. Above the chancel arch is a painting of St Peter's Denial of Christ by Hayman together with three pairs of hatchments belonging to the Dod family of Edge Hall, the Tarleton family formerly of Bolesworth and the Cholmondeley family of Cholmondeley Castle. Within each chantry chapel is a tomb. In the Brereton chapel the tomb is that of Sir Randal Brereton and his wife, and is dated 1522. The monument in the Cholmondeley chapel was erected in 1605 and represents Sir Hugh Cholmondeley and his second wife, Mary. Also in this chapel is a memorial to Lady Cholmondeley who died in 1815 by Westmacott. In the chancel is a memorial tablet to Charles Wolley Dod who died in 1904 by Edward Hilton. In the nave is a slab to Urian Davenport, rector of Malpas, who died in 1495. In the south aisle are tablets to John Stockton who died in 1700, and Bridget Kynaston who died in 1644. In the north aisle is a memorial to Lt. Col. Henry Tarleton who died in 1820 by Edwards and Company of Wrexham.

On the south side of the chancel is a triple sedilia and a piscina. The altarpiece was presented by a Mr Drake in 1721. Against the south wall of the chancel are three 15th-century stalls with misericords. The stained glass includes a panel in the north chapel dating from around 1500 depicting the Presentation in the Temple. Also present are several Continental panels and medallions dating from the 16th and 17th centuries. The east window of 1841 and the east windows in the aisles dating from about 1845 are by William Warrington. In the north aisle is a window from about 1928 that has been attributed to Ballantyne. In the south aisle is a window dated 1902 by Kempe. The east window is a memorial to Bishop Heber who was born in the town. From the sanctuary a staircase leads down to a vaulted crypt below the altar which was formerly a treasury. The two-manual organ was built in 1897 by Lewis and Company, overhauled around 1962 by Rushworth and Dreaper and restored at a later date by Peter Collins. The parish registers date from 1561 and the churchwardens' accounts from 1653. There is a ring of eight bells. Four of these were cast by John Rudhall in 1802, and the other four were by John Taylor and Company, two of these being dated 1908 and the other two in 1914.

== External features ==
Parts of the churchyard wall are listed Grade II. Within the churchyard are a number of other items listed Grade II, namely, a table tomb dedicated to members of the Duncall family, the tomb of John Bassett, a headstone to the Hobley family, and a sandstone sundial pedestal dating probably from the early 18th century. Listed at Grade II* are the gate piers and steps at the southwest corner of the churchyard, and the gates, gate piers and steps at south-east corner of churchyard. They were originally made for Oulton Park in the 1720s at the time of John Vanbrugh's work there. They were moved to Malpas churchyard around 1773. The gate piers and steps to the west gateway to the churchyard are listed at Grade II, as are the gate piers and steps to a small gateway at the southeast corner of the churchyard.

== See also ==
- Grade I listed buildings in Cheshire West and Chester
- Grade I listed churches in Cheshire
- Listed buildings of Malpas, Cheshire
- List of church restorations, amendments and furniture by John Douglas
