= St Chad's Chapel, Tushingham =

Coordinates: 53.01178°N 2.70570°W

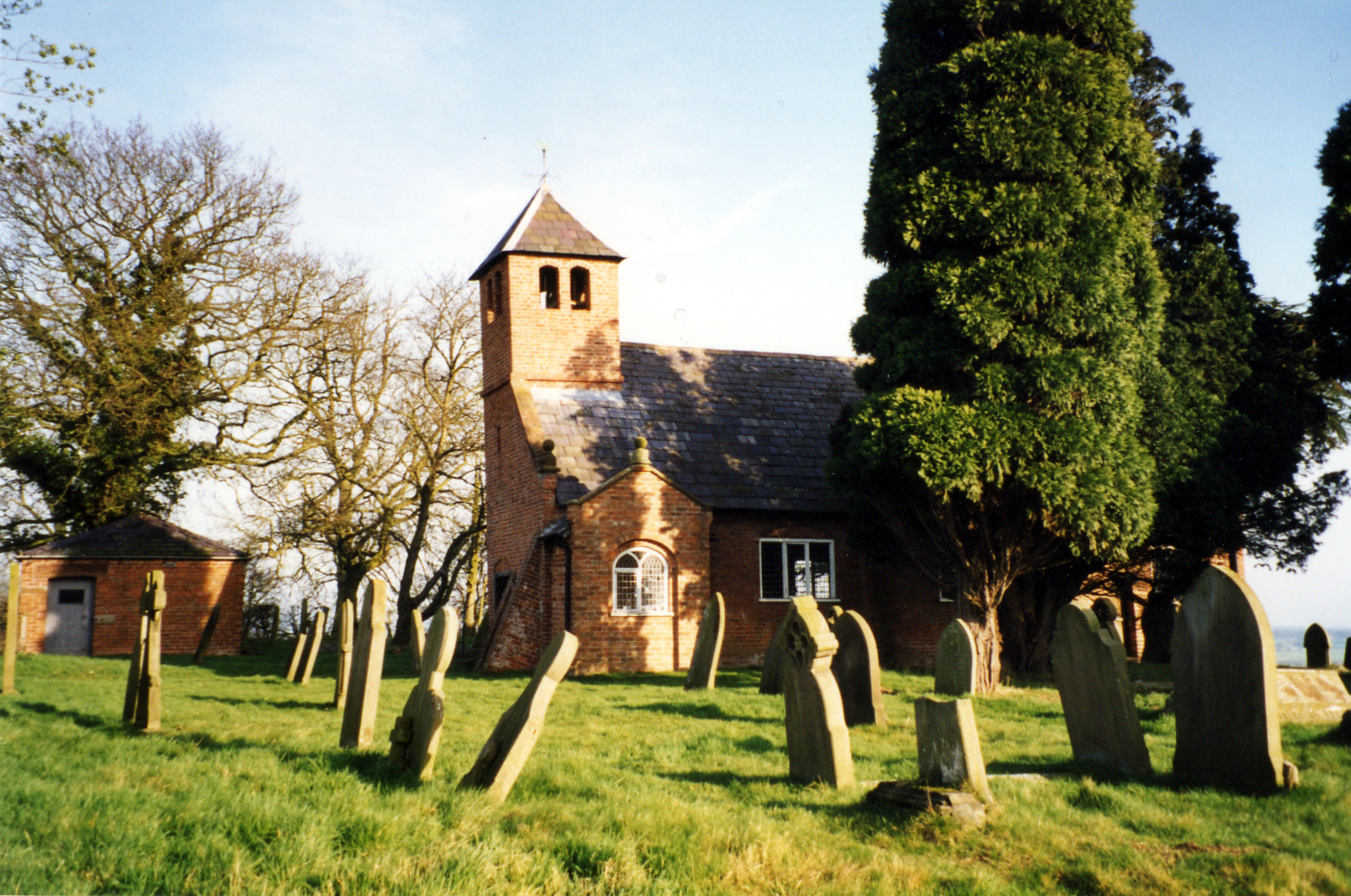
- St Chad's Chapel, Tushingham

- Location in Cheshire
- OS grid reference: SJ 526 463
- Location: Tushingham, Cheshire
- Country: England
- Denomination: Anglican

History
- Dedication: Saint Chad

Architecture
- Heritage designation: Grade I
- Designated: 1 March 1967
- Architectural type: Chapel
- Completed: 1691

Specifications
- Materials: Brown brick, slate roof

Administration
- Province: York
- Diocese: Chester
- Parish: Tushingham cum Grindley

St Chad's Chapel (often referred to as Old St Chad's) is an isolated church in the scattered community of Tushingham in the civil parish of Tushingham-cum-Grindley, Macefen and Bradley, Cheshire, England. The only approach to the chapel is on footpaths across fields from the A41 road. It is recorded in the National Heritage List for England as a designated Grade I listed building.

== History ==
Deeds dated 1349 refer to a chapel on this site which was a chapel of ease to St Oswald's Church, Malpas. A document dated 1621 refers to it as Chadwick Chapel, although by 1636 another document called it Chad Chapel. It was rebuilt in 1689–91 and has been little changed since. The principal financial donations for the chapel were from John Dod, a London mercer who had been born in Tushingham. The chapel is now referred to as Old Chad because its functions have been replaced by St Chad's Church built in 1863 on the A41 road.

The church is still concsecrated and monthly Sunday evening services are still held, weather permitting, in the chapel during the summer, most notably a Rushbearing Service in August.

== Architecture ==
=== Exterior ===
The chapel is built in brown brick with a grey slate roof. Its plan consists of a tower at the west end with an external staircase leading to an internal west gallery. The body of the chapel is in three bays without aisles; it is furnished as a nave and a chancel. A vestry projects south from the west bay of the nave. The tower is small with a pyramid-roof. It has a west door with a loophole above it, a plain band at the belfry floor level, paired camber-headed bell-openings and a weathercock.

=== Interior ===
The roof is unusual in that the sections between the principal beams are filled with carvings making a star-like pattern. All the chapel furnishings are made from Cheshire oak. The holy table dates from the 17th century, and on each side of it are panelled family box pews. On the wall above the south pew are three marble memorials to the Vernon and Murhall families, and above the north pew is a marble memorial to the Stephens family. Above the two east windows is the royal coat of arms of George III. A low screen divides the chancel from the nave. The seating in the nave consists of plain seats and backs without any decoration. At the west end is a gallery which is reached by the external staircase. The font is Jacobean in style, and the pulpit is a three-decker.

== External features ==
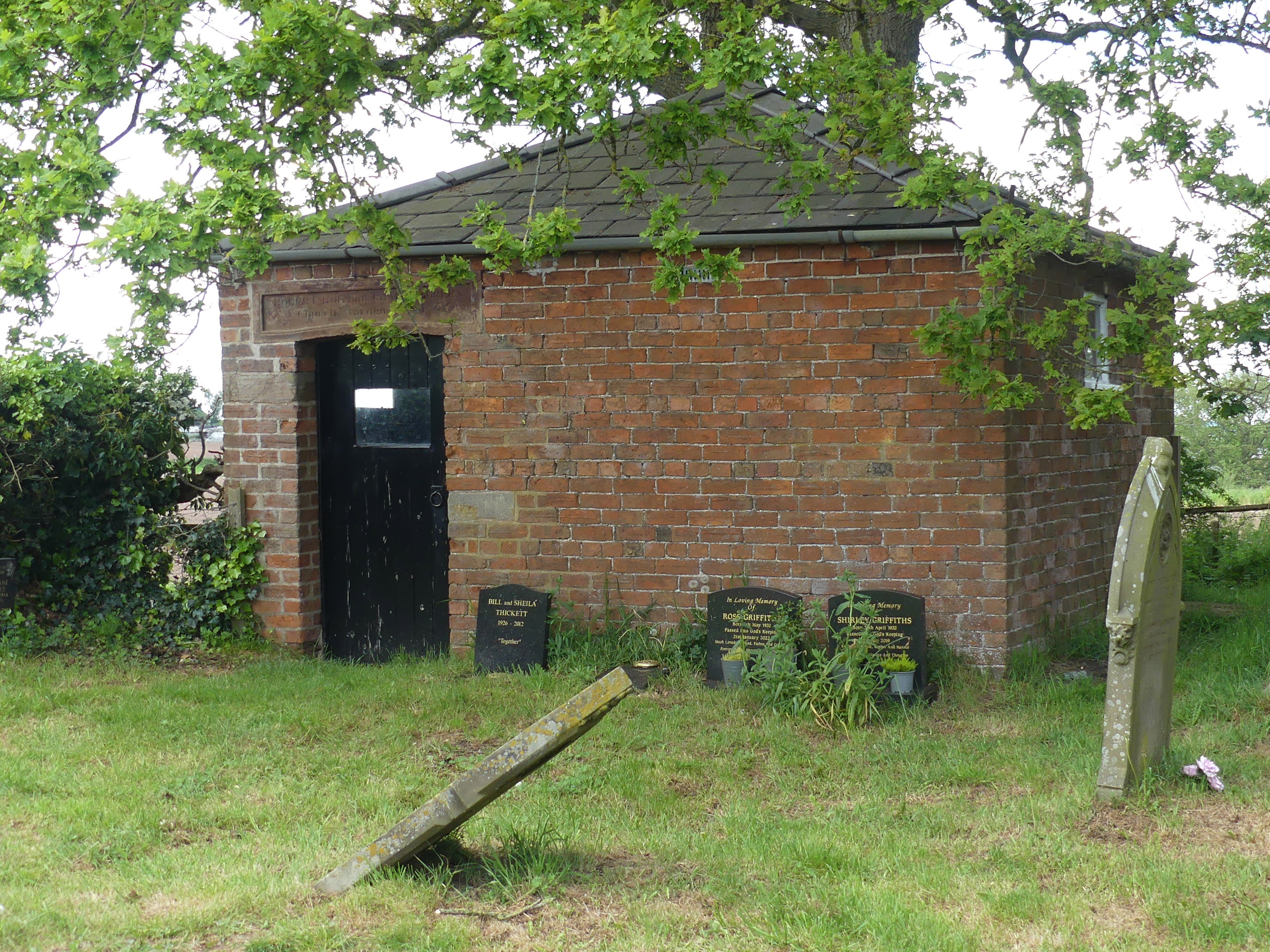
Grade II listed hearse house

Adjacent to the church is a small building containing a horse-drawn hearse. It is built of brown brick with a pyramidal roof of grey slates and is dated 1822. The hearse-house is a Grade II listed building.

== See also ==
- Grade I listed churches in Cheshire
- Listed buildings in Tushingham cum Grindley
