= Tushingham =

Community in England

Coordinates: 53°1′N 2°43′W

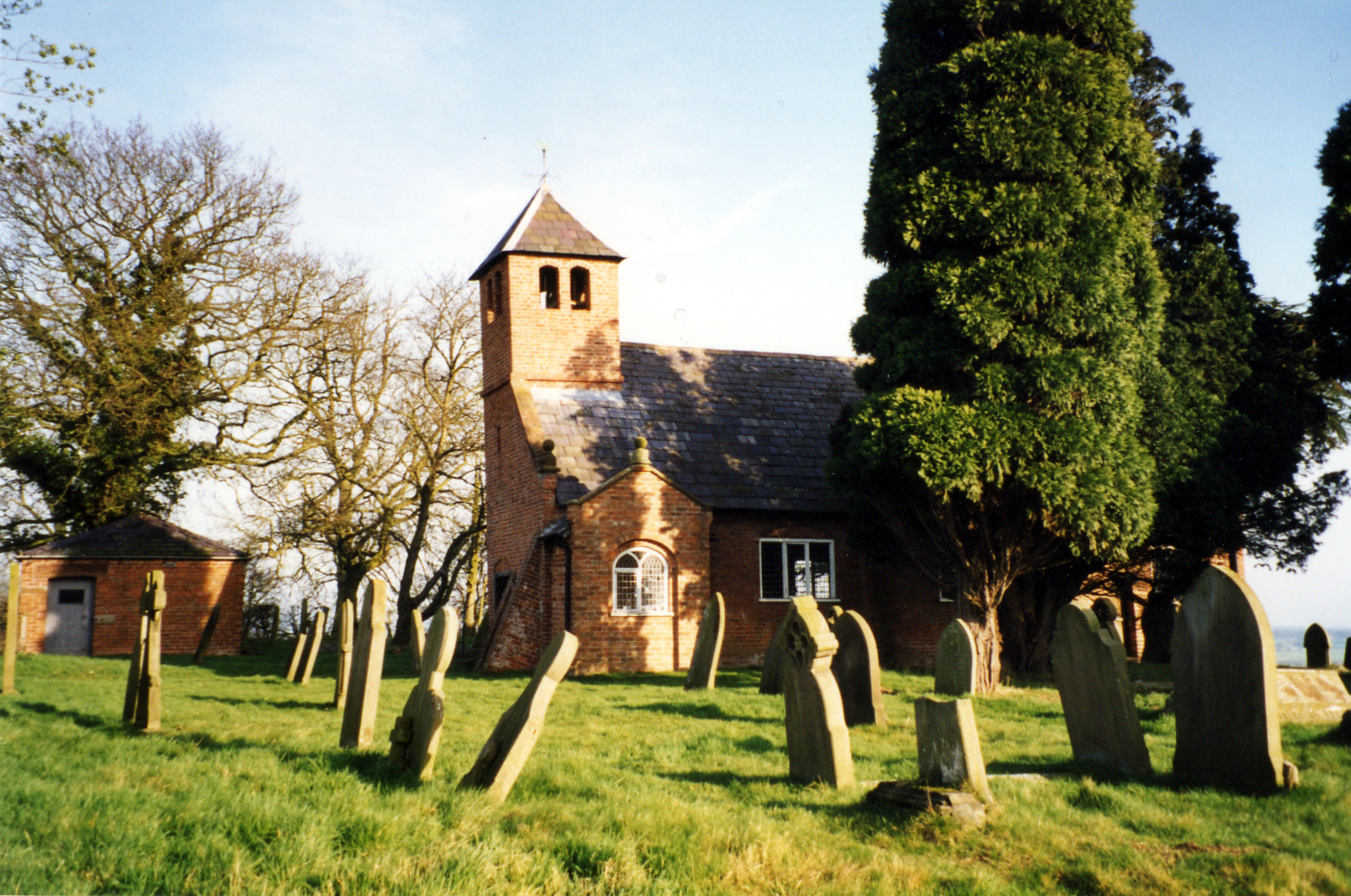
St Chad's Chapel, Tushingham

Tushingham is a scattered community in the civil parish of Tushingham-cum-Grindley, Macefen and Bradley (Tushingham cum Grindley until 2015), in the Cheshire West and Chester district, in the county of Cheshire, England.

St Chad's Chapel, Tushingham is a Grade I listed building. There are also a number of Grade II listed buildings which include Tushingham Hall, Tushingham House and the Blue Bell Inn.
