= Cholmondeley =

Cholmondeley (/ˈtʃʌmli/ CHUM-lee) may refer to:

== People ==
- Cholmondeley (surname)
- Alice Cholmondeley, a pseudonym used by Elizabeth von Arnim for her book Christine

== Places ==
- Cholmondeley, Cheshire, England, a civil parish
  - Cholmondeley Castle, a country house in the parish
- Cholmondeley Islet, Queensland, Australia
- Cholmondeley Sound, a bay in southeast Alaska, United States

== Arts and entertainment ==
- The Cholmondeleys, an all-female modern dance group
- Cholmondeley Award, for poetry, given annually by the Society of Authors
- Lord Cholmondeley, a minor character in The Transformers
- The Cholmondeley Ladies, 17th-century English portrait

== Other uses ==
- Marquess of Cholmondeley, a title in the Peerage of the United Kingdom, also Earl of Cholmondeley and Viscount Cholmondeley
- Cholmondeley cello, made by Antonio Stradivarius around 1698
- Cholmondeley Children's Centre, near Christchurch, New Zealand
- Cholmondeley Award, an annual award for poetry given by the Society of Authors in the United Kingdom
- A chimpanzee brought from Africa by Gerald Durrell
- Cholmondeley's, a coffee shop at Brandeis University

== See also ==
- Cholomondeley Goonewardene (1917–2006), Sri Lankan politician and cabinet minister
- Cholmley
- Cholmeley
- Chulmleigh (disambiguation)
- Chumley
