= Listed buildings in Cholmondeley, Cheshire =

Cholmondeley is a civil parish in Cheshire East, England. It contains 24 buildings that are recorded in the National Heritage List for England as designated listed buildings. Of these, one is listed at Grade I, the highest grade, two are listed at Grade II*, the middle grade, and the others are at Grade II. The parish is dominated by Cholmondeley Castle, its gardens and its estate. In addition to the castle itself, almost all the listed buildings are related to it, or are nearby farm buildings.

== Key ==
| Grade | Criteria |
|---|---|
| I | Buildings of exceptional interest, sometimes considered to be internationally important |
| II* | Particularly important buildings of more than special interest |
| II | Buildings of national importance and special interest |

== Buildings ==
| Name and location | Photograph | Date | Notes | Grade |
|---|---|---|---|---|
| St Nicholas' Chapel; 53.06005°N 2.68080°W | | 15th century | A private chapel for Cholmondeley Castle, it was initially timber-framed, and repaired in 1652. In 1717 the chancel was encased in brick, and the rest of the chapel was rebuilt in brick. Transepts were added in 1829, followed by galleries in 1840. The chapel has a cruciform plan, and a slated roof. Most of the furnishings date from the 17th century. | I |
| Field's Farmhouse; 53.05210°N 2.66524°W | — | 1648 | The farmhouse is timber-framed with plastered brick nogging, and has tiled roofs. It is in two storeys with an attic, and has a three-bay front. The first floor and the gable are jettied. The windows are mullioned, or mullioned and transomed. The farmhouse was restored in 1903. | II |
| Shingles Cottages; 53.05181°N 2.67241°W | | Late 17th century | A pair of timber-framed cottages with brick nogging and shingle cladding to the upper parts. They have tiled roofs, and are in two storeys. The windows are casements, those in the upper storey being in gables or half dormers. There is an extension at the rear giving the building an L-shaped plan. | II |
| The Mews; 53.06192°N 2.69416°W | | Late 17th century | This originated as stables for Cholmondeley Castle, later converted into garages and living accommodation. The building is timber-framed with brick nogging and a tiled roof. Most of the windows are casements. In the roof is a dormer and other lights. | II |
| Gated entrance, Temple Gardens; 53.05576°N 2.69169°W | | 1694–95 | The entrance is on the north side of Temple Garden in the grounds of Cholmondeley Castle and was designed by Jean Tijou. It is in wrought iron with stonework added probably in the early 19th century. There are two full and two half columns with Corinthian features. Between the columns is the gate and an overthrow. There is a decorated screen on a stone plinth between the columns and the half columns, and beyond them is sandstone walling. | II |
| Cherub statue, Temple Gardens; 53.05555°N 2.69209°W | | 1695 | The statue by van Nost is in cast lead, and stands to the north of the lake in Temple Gardens, Cholmondeley Castle. It consists of three winged cherubs holding a basket of flowers. They stand on a base of natural stone slabs on a short stone pillar. | II |
| Old Hall; 53.06022°N 2.67917°W | — | 1707 | The former timber-framed hall was rebuilt by William and Francis Smith for the 1st Earl of Cholmondeley. It was reduced to its present size in 1801. The house is in brick with a slate roof. It is in two storeys with a three-bay front, and a lower single-bay wing to the east. The entrance is flanked by Roman Doric columns supporting a gabled hood. Most of the windows are sashes; those in the east wing are casements. | II |
| Gates and screen, Cholmondeley Castle; 53.05671°N 2.69545°W | | 1722 | The gates were made by Robert Bakewell for the Old Hall and were moved here when it was reduced in size. The gate piers, and the low screen wall are in stone, and the screen, gates and overthrow are in wrought iron. The screen and overthrow are elaborately decorated, and the gates are plainer. | II* |
| North gates, St Nicholas' Chapel; 53.06026°N 2.68109°W | | 1722 | The gates were made by Robert Bakewell for the Old Hall and were moved here in 1829. They are in wrought iron and consist of a pair of high gates and a pair of wicket gates. These all hang from wrought iron piers. All are elaborately decorated. At the outer sides of the wicket gates are square stone piers. | II |
| South gates, St Nicholas' Chapel; 53.05985°N 2.68112°W | | 1722 | The gates were made by Robert Bakewell for the Old Hall and were moved here in 1829. They are in wrought iron and consist of a pair of high gates and a pair of wicket gates. These all hang from wrought iron piers. All are elaborately decorated. At the outer sides of the wicket gates are square stone piers. | II |
| Castle Farm House; 53.05683°N 2.70056°W | — | Late 18th century | A brick farmhouse with a hipped slate roof. It is in two storeys and has a three-bay front. In the centre is an entrance with a semicircular arch and a fanlight. The windows are sashes. | II |
| Cholmondeley Castle; 53.0572°N 2.6932°W | | 1801–04 | A large country house built for the 1st Marquess of Cholmondeley the consultant architect being William Turner. In 1828–29 Robert Smirke added a large round tower and made other alterations to give the house the appearance of a castle. It is built in sandstone, and has roofs of lead and slate. The house is mainly in three storeys with a basement, and towers rising to a higher level. | II* |
| Bridge, East approach 53.05945°N 2.68863°W | | Early 19th century | The sandstone bridge spans wetland on the east approach to Cholmondeley Castle. It consists of two widely separated semicircular arches. The bridge has approach parapets with square end piers. | II |
| Bridge, Temple Gardens; 53.05528°N 2.69329°W | | Early 19th century | The bridge is at the west end of the lake in Temple Gardens, Cholmondeley Castle. It is in sandstone and has a Tudor arched opening. The parapets each consist of two dolphins facing each other with their tails raised in the air. Each dolphin is carved from three pieces of stone. | II |
| Deer Park Lodge; 53.05418°N 2.67927°W | — | Early 19th century | The lodge stands within the grounds of Cholmondeley Castle on its southeast approach. It is built in brick, with roofs of tiles and slates. The lodge is in two storeys, and has a front of two bays. In the lower floor is a central canted bay window containing casements. There are two casement windows in the upper floor with Tudor arched lintels. | II |
| Higginsfield House; 53.06528°N 2.66123°W | — | Early 19th century | This originated as the dower house of the Cholmondeley Estate. It is built in brick with a slate roof. The house has two storeys, a five-bay front, and a rear wing giving it a T-shaped plan. On the front is a projecting porch with a frieze, a cornice, and flat roof carried on timber piers and pilasters. The windows are sashes with wedge lintels. | II |
| Nantwich Lodge; 53.05057°N 2.67481°W | | Early 19th century | This was the original lodge at the south entrance to Cholmondeley Castle. It is built in rendered brick and has a thatched roof. The lodge is in a single storey with an attic, and has a one-bay front. The front contains a doorway and a pair of Gothic-headed casement windows. The other windows have one light. | II |
| Park House; 53.06185°N 2.69330°W | | Early 19th century | The house is in the grounds of Cholmondeley Castle. It is built in brick with slate roofs, has two storeys and a six-bay front. There are two rear wings of two and three storeys, giving the-house an F-shaped plan. The two end bays have gables with open pediments, and two of the other bays have smaller gables. On the front is a large canted bay window. Most of the windows are sashes. | II |
| Park House Lodge; 53.06126°N 2.69452°W | — | Early 19th century | The lodge stands within the grounds of Cholmondeley Castle on its north approach. It is built in brick, and has a slate roof. It is in two storeys, and has a single-bay front with an added single-bay entrance. In the gable-end is a small canted bay window containing cast iron lattice casements, and above this is a two-light casement with lozenge glazing. The gable is in the form of an open pediment. | II |
| Somerset Lodge; 53.05914°N 2.69210°W | | Early 19th century | This consists of a gatehouse within the grounds of Cholmondeley Castle, crossing its east approach. It is in sandstone and contains a large carriage arch on which is a shield. The flanking bays have crenellated parapets. Inside the arch are doorways with Tudor arched heads on each side. On each side of the gatehouse are crenellated wing walls. | II |
| Temple, Temple Gardens; 53.05528°N 2.69263°W | | c. 1830 | The temple is a red sandstone structure standing on the island in the lake of Temple Gardens, Cholmondeley Castle. It has a square plan, with the sides and the top being open. The interior is paved and contains a goblet-shaped stone vessel. Its front consists of four fluted Roman Doric columns supporting a Tuscan entablature. | II |
| Beeston Lodge; 53.06261°N 2.66185°W | | 1854 | A lodge and gateway designed by S. S. Teulon. Built in red sandstone with a tiled roof, it consists of a two-storey lodge with a tower, and a gateway to the right. The lodge has a three-bay east front. On the left is a square stair turret with lancet windows, a pyramidal roof, and a mushroom finial. The tower on the right broaches to become octagonal; it has arrow slits, lancets, and a crenellated parapet. Between them are two lancets and an oriel window, above which is a stepped gable. To the right is a wall containing a wicket gate, and the gateway. There are curved flanking crenellated wing walls. | II |
| Rotunda, Temple Gardens; 53.05535°N 2.69334°W | | Late 19th century | The rotunda consists of a shelter with seats, moved from elsewhere in the 19th century, and to its present position in the 20th century. It is in limestone with an openwork dome in wrought iron. The shelter is approached by two steps, and has six slender Corinthian columns supporting a circular cornice and the dome. The bases of the columns are decorated with various motifs, and the columns are linked by a circular stone seat. | II |
| Scotch Farm; 53.06040°N 2.69513°W | | 1887 | The building surrounds a quadrangle. It is in brick with some terracotta dressings, and has roofs of tiles and asbestos cement. It is in two storeys, with fronts of nine and twelve bays. There are octagonal towers with pyramidal roofs and ball finials, between which is a gatehouse surmounted by a bell turret with a weather vane. The windows are mullioned or mullioned and transomed, and contain casements. | II |

== See also ==
- Listed buildings in Ridley
- Listed buildings in Faddiley
- Listed buildings in Chorley
- Listed buildings in Wrenbury cum Frith
- Listed buildings in Norbury
- Listed buildings in Egerton
- Listed buildings in Bulkeley
