= Montague Cholmeley =

Montague Cholmeley may refer to:

- Sir Montague Cholmeley, 1st Baronet (1772–1831), British MP for Grantham 1820–1826
- Sir Montague Cholmeley, 2nd Baronet (1802–1874), British MP for Grantham 1826–1831 and North Lincolnshire
- Sir Montagu Aubrey Rowley Cholmeley, 4th Baronet (1876–1914), of the Cholmeley baronets
- Sir Montague John Cholmeley, 6th Baronet (1935–1998), of the Cholmeley baronets

== See also ==
- Cholmeley (surname)
