= Chorley, Cholmondeley =

Hamlet in Cheshire, England

Coordinates: 53.05545°N 2.63703°W

Chorley
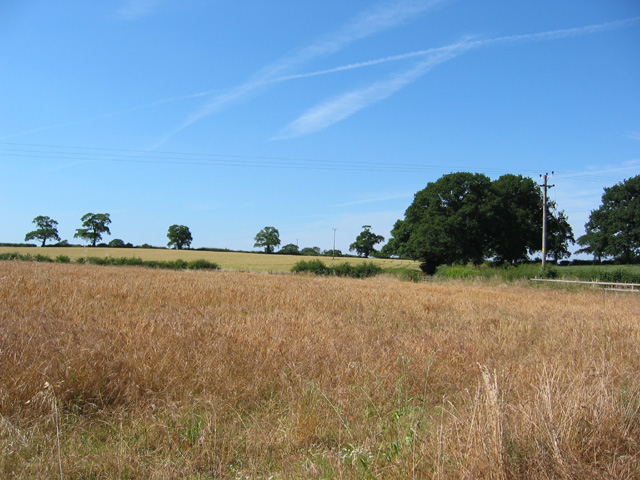
- Barley and wheat fields, Chorley

- Location within Cheshire
- Population: 107 (2011)
- OS grid reference: SJ574511
- Civil parish: Chorley
- Unitary authority: Cheshire East
- Ceremonial county: Cheshire
- Region: North West
- Country: England
- Sovereign state: United Kingdom
- Post town: NANTWICH
- Postcode district: CW5
- Dialling code: 01829
- Police: Cheshire
- Fire: Cheshire
- Ambulance: North West
- UK Parliament: Chester South and Eddisbury

Chorley is a hamlet (at SJ574511) and civil parish in the unitary authority of Cheshire East and the ceremonial county of Cheshire, England. The hamlet lies 5 miles to the west of Nantwich and 6 miles to the north east of Malpas. The total population is a little over a hundred people. Nearby villages include Faddiley, Norbury, Ravensmoor and Wrenbury.

It should not be confused with the civil parish of Chorley near the town of Alderley Edge, also in Cheshire East.

== Governance ==
Chorley is administered jointly with the adjacent parish of Cholmondeley by Cholmondeley & Chorley Parish Council. From 1974 the civil parish was served by Crewe and Nantwich Borough Council, which was succeeded on 1 April 2009 by the unitary authority of Cheshire East. Since 2024 Chorley has been within the parliamentary constituency of Chester South and Eddisbury which is represented by Aphra Brandreth.

== Geography and transport ==
The River Weaver forms the southern boundary of the parish and part of its western boundary, and two of its tributaries run north–south through the parish. Another brook forms part of the parish's northern boundary. The terrain is gently undulating, with a high point of around 100 metres at the north-west corner of the parish and a low point of around 75 metres in the south, near Chorley Stock. The main land use is agricultural. There are multiple small meres and ponds scattered across the farmland, as well as a few small areas of woodland.

Nantwich Road runs east–west through the parish to Larden Green in the adjacent parish of Faddiley; it connects to the A49 – which runs north–south around 500 metres to the west – via Wrenbury Road near Chorley Bank. The hamlet of Chorley lies at the junction of Nantwich Road with Chorley Green Lane, which runs north west back to the A49.

== Demography ==
According to the 2001 census, the parish had a population of 100, increasing to 107 in 42 households at the 2011 census. This represents a decline from the population of 1851; historical population figures are 126 (1801), 173 (1851), 132 (1901) and 167 (1951). The population density was 0.2 persons/hectare in 2011, well below the average of 3.2 persons/hectare for Cheshire East.

== Education ==
As of 2016, there are no schools within the civil parish. Chorley falls within the catchment areas of Bickerton Holy Trinity CE Primary School in Bickerton for primary education and Bishop Heber High School in Malpas for secondary education.

== See also ==
- Listed buildings in Chorley, Cholmondeley
