= Listed buildings in Wrenbury cum Frith =

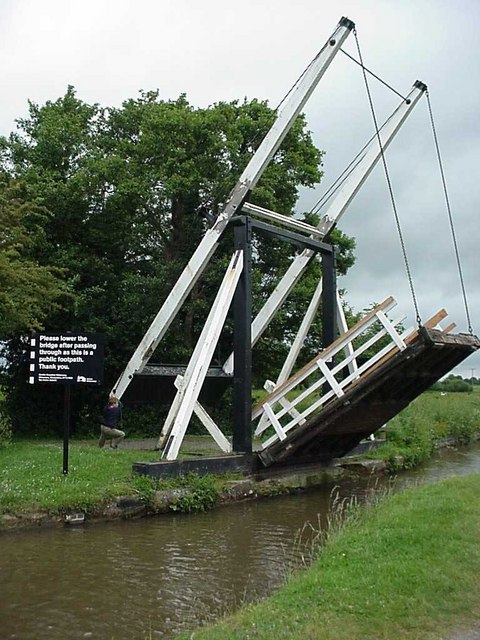
Wrenbury Church Bridge over the Llangollen Canal is a grade-II*-listed lift bridge built by Thomas Telford.

Fourteen buildings and other structures in the English civil parish of Wrenbury cum Frith have been officially designated as listed buildings for their "special architectural and historic interest". Three of the listed buildings are classified as being in grade II* and the remainder in grade II; the parish has no grade-I-listed buildings.

Wrenbury cum Frith is in the Cheshire East division of the ceremonial county of Cheshire, situated on the Cheshire Plain. The River Weaver and the Llangollen Canal both cross the civil parish. Before the railway network reached the area, the canal was important for the transport of locally produced cheese and other dairy products from this dairy farming region to Chester, North Wales and the Midlands. Three timber canal lift bridges of the drawbridge type were constructed by Thomas Telford, probably in the 1790s, after his appointment as engineer to what was then known as the Ellesmere Canal. Two of the lift bridges are footbridges serving farms, which are still operated manually using the original counterweight system; they are listed at grade II*. The third, believed to be one of only two lift bridges of this type in the country to carry road traffic, has had a mechanical crank fitted. A fourth sandstone road bridge crosses the Weaver. A lock on the canal is also listed.

The village of Wrenbury is the only substantial settlement in the civil parish. Many of the listed buildings and structures in the civil parish are located within the conservation area that protects much of its centre and spreads north-west to beyond the canal. Five cluster around the village green and the adjacent parish church dedicated to St Margaret, the third grade-II*-listed structure. The church dates from the early 16th century and is the oldest listed structure in the civil parish. The four half-timbered "black and white" cottages to have listed status all date from the 17th century; this century accounts for half of the timber-framed buildings in Cheshire. The earliest are believed to be Elm House on the village green and a small cottage within the churchyard, thought to be a former almshouse and a schoolmaster's house associated with the free school founded in 1605, also located in the churchyard. Later listed buildings are built in brick, a reflection of the shift in domestic architecture from timber framing to brick construction, also observed in unlisted buildings. The most recent listed building is the village primary school of 1879, which is typical of the local schools built after the Elementary Education Act 1870.

== Listed buildings and structures ==
| Grade | Criteria |
|---|---|
| Grade II* | Particularly important buildings of more than special interest. |
| Grade II | Buildings of national importance and special interest. |

| Name | Image | Grade | Built | Location, OS Grid ref. (Note: Sometimes known as OSGB36, the grid reference is based on the British national grid reference system used by the Ordnance Survey.) | Description |
|---|---|---|---|---|---|
| Church of St Margaret | photograph | II* | early 16th century | Adjacent to Wrenbury village green SJ 59364 47768 | St Margaret's is a parish church in red sandstone ashlar under a tile roof. The five-bay clerestoried nave and chancel have battlemented parapets. The west tower has battlements and pinnacles to its corners; an octagonal stair turret climbs to its roof. |
| Wrenbury Church Bridge | photograph | II* | c.1790 | Llangollen Canal, north of church SJ 59432 48070 | Wrenbury Church Bridge (no. 19) is a single-span timber lift bridge by Thomas Telford. It is an accommodation bridge and also serves a public footpath. The bridge is lifted manually via a counterbalancing weight fixed to paired beams parallel to the bridge platform and attached to its free end with chains. Vertical beams support the structure, and the timberwork is strengthened with iron rods. Guards were installed in 1889. |
| Wrenbury Frith Bridge | photograph | II* | c.1790 | Llangollen Canal SJ 58440 47612 | Wrenbury Frith Bridge (no. 21) is a single-span timber lift bridge by Thomas Telford. It is an accommodation bridge with no public right of way. The bridge is lifted manually via a counterbalancing weight fixed to paired beams parallel to the bridge platform and attached to its free end with chains. Vertical beams support the structure, and the timberwork is strengthened with iron rods. The bridge has no guard rails. |
| Baddiley Lock Number 1 | photograph | II | 1805 | Llangollen Canal, near Baddiley SJ 60758 49239 | This canal lock, the first in a series of three, lies on the boundary with Baddiley. It was built by J. Fletcher for Thomas Telford in blue-and-red brick with stone dressings. The lower lock gates are double wooden mitre gates, replaced in 2011; the single upper gate is a metal replacement. |
| Cottage in the churchyard of St Margaret | photograph | II | c.1600 | Wrenbury churchyard SJ 59403 47767 | Sometimes known as Churchyard Cottage, this small single-storey building is possibly a former almshouse and schoolmaster's house. It has a timber frame featuring small framing with brick infill. The asbestos tile roof replaces the original thatch. In 1997, it was restored for use as a holiday cottage. |
| Elm House | photograph | II | 17th century | Wrenbury village green SJ 59330 47680 | Elm House is a large two-storey half-timbered cottage with a slate roof and a prominent brick chimney, placed asymmetrically. The timber frame features small framing with angle braces and has rendered brick infill. Restoration in the 1990s incorporated brick outbuildings to form an L-shape. The building was formerly used as a grocer's shop and is now a private dwelling. |
| The Grange | photograph | II | 17th century | Wrenbury Road, near station SJ 60087 46894 | The Grange, formerly known as Smeaton Grange, is a half-timbered, two-storey farmhouse under a tiled roof. The timber frame features small framing which has been infilled with brick. The main face has a protruding gabled wing with a jettied first floor. A prominent brick chimney is placed asymmetrically. |
| Hawk House | photograph | II | early 18th century | Nantwich Road, just off village green SJ 59478 47691 | Hawk House is a whitewashed brick cottage of two storeys and four bays under a tiled roof, with three symmetrically placed brick chimneys. A central porch and a wing to the rear were added in the 19th century. Now a private dwelling, the building was once an inn, called the Hawk and later the Hawk and Buckle, and was also used as a butcher's shop. |
| Pinsley Green Cottages | photograph | II | late 17th century | Pinsley Green SJ 58876 46798 | Pinsley Green Cottages are a pair of terraced cottages, now a single house, with a tiled roof replacing the original thatch. The older northern cottage has a timber frame, featuring small framing with a middle rail and passing braces. The southern cottage dates from the mid 18th century and is built of rendered brick. There is a 20th-century extension to the rear. |
| Railings, gates and gatepiers to churchyard of St Margaret | | II | early 19th century | Between village green and churchyard SJ 59383 47718 | These cast-iron railings and gates to the churchyard have a central double gate flanked with paired wicket gates. The four gatepiers have latticed sides and are topped with finials shaped like pinecones. The palings of the railings have arrowhead tops. |
| School | photograph | II | 1879 | Nantwich Road SJ 59793 47539 | Wrenbury School is an L-shaped single-storey primary school in red brick with blue-brick diapering and stone dressings. A wing protrudes on the left of the front face, with decorative timberwork to the gable and a triple arched window; the two large gables to the front face have similar timberwork and windows. A square bellcote stands in the angle of the L; it becomes circular above roof level and is topped with a weather vane. The adjacent chimney breast bears a circular stone date plaque. The building was extended in 1987. |
| Starkey Farmhouse (Tudor Rose Farm) | | II | 17th century | Nantwich Road SJ 60626 49134 | Starkey Farmhouse, also known as Gillys Farm and currently Tudor Rose Farm, is a two-storey half-timbered former farmhouse with a shingle roof, which replaces the original thatch. The timber frame features small framing with angle braces, and has rendered brick infill. One gable is slightly jettied. A central wing at the rear dates from later in the 17th century and is also half-timbered; it has been further extended in the 20th century. The interior has paintings on either side of the fireplace, believed to date from before the Reformation and to show Saint Peter and Simon the Zealot. |
| Wrenbury Bridge | photograph | II | c.1790 | Llangollen Canal, at western edge of Wrenbury village SJ 58994 48043 | Wrenbury Bridge (no. 20) is a single-span timber lift bridge by Thomas Telford, which carries Cholmondeley Road. A mechanical crank was fitted in the 20th century to operate the bridge. It was formerly lifted manually via a counterbalancing weight fixed to paired beams parallel to the bridge platform and attached to its free end with chains. Vertical beams support the structure, and the timberwork is strengthened with iron rods. |
| Wrenbury Mill Bridge | | II | mid/late 19th century | Wrenbury Road SJ 59994 47206 | Wrenbury Mill Bridge is a single-span road bridge over the River Weaver in red sandstone ashlar, with a plain parapet. |

== See also ==
- Listed buildings in Norbury
- Listed buildings in Cholmondeley
- Listed buildings in Chorley
- Listed buildings in Baddiley
- Listed buildings in Sound
- Listed buildings in Newhall
- Listed buildings in Dodcott cum Wilkesley
- Listed buildings in Marbury cum Quoisley

== Notes and references ==
=== Sources ===
- Latham, Frank A. (ed.) Wrenbury and Marbury (The Local History Group; 1999)
- McKenna, Laurie. Timber Framed Buildings in Cheshire (Cheshire County Council; 1994) (ISBN 0-906765-16-1)
- Smiles, Samuel. The Life of Thomas Telford, Civil Engineer (John Murray; 1867)
