= Cholmondeley, Cheshire =

Civil parish in Cheshire, England

Coordinates: 53.057088°N 2.691637°W

Cholmondeley
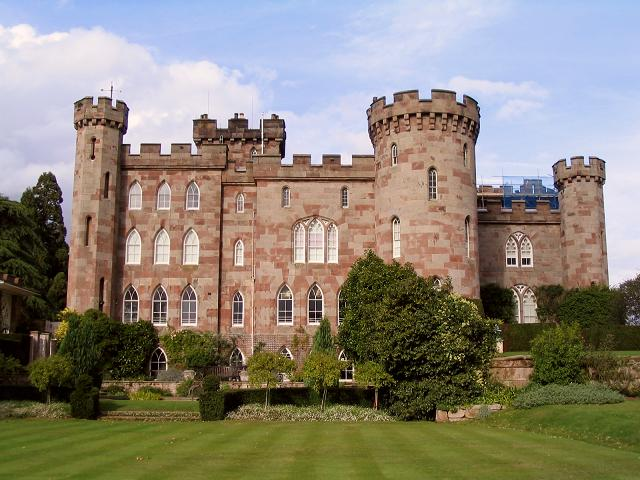
- Cholmondeley Castle

- Location within Cheshire
- Population: 157 (2011)
- OS grid reference: SJ536513
- Civil parish: Cholmondeley
- Unitary authority: Cheshire East
- Ceremonial county: Cheshire
- Region: North West
- Country: England
- Sovereign state: United Kingdom
- Post town: MALPAS
- Postcode district: SY14
- Dialling code: 01829
- UK Parliament: Chester South and Eddisbury

Cholmondeley (/ˈtʃʌmli/ CHUM-lee) is a civil parish in Cheshire, England, north east of Malpas and west of Nantwich. It includes the small settlements of Croxton Green (SJ552527) and Dowse Green (SJ561517), with a total population of a little over a hundred, increasing to 157 at the 2011 Census. Nearby villages include Bickerton to the north east, Bulkeley to the north, No Man's Heath to the south west, and Bickley Moss to the south.

The name means "clearing of Ceolmund", this being an Old English forename made up of the elements ceol, "ship", and mund, "protection".

Cholmondeley Castle is in Cholmondeley and much of the civil parish falls within the Cholmondeley Estate, owned by the Marquess of Cholmondeley. Its parkland includes mixed woodland and plantations, lakes, gardens and farmland.

== Geography, transport and economy ==
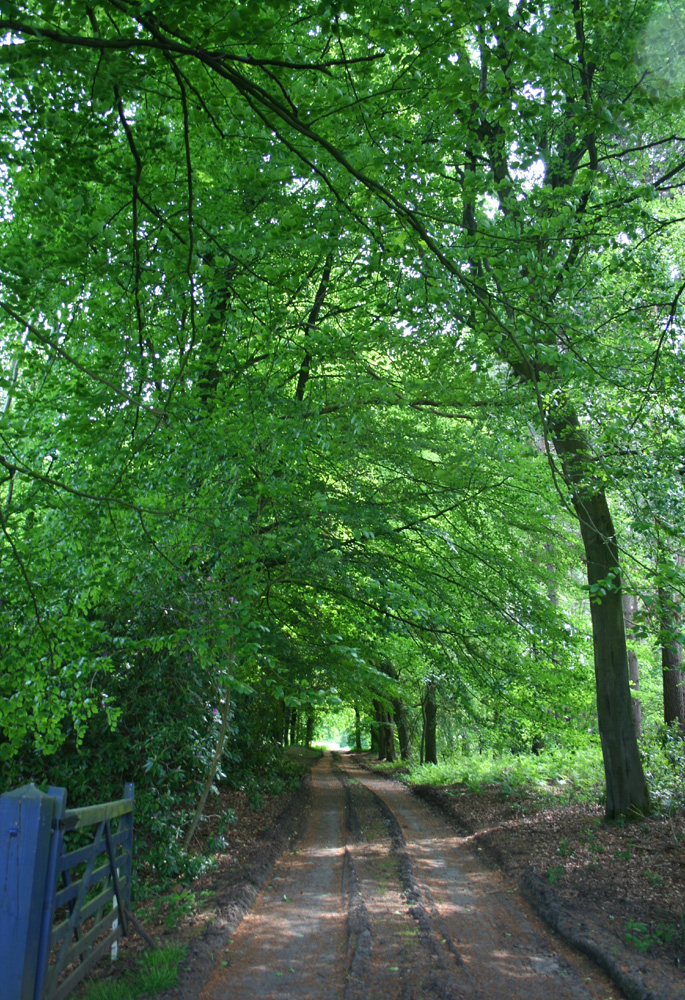
Moss Wood

The civil parish has a total area of 2,647 acres (1,071 hectares). The Cholmondeley Estate stretches from the A49 in the east to the Cholmondeley lane to the west and the parish boundary to the south; it is designated an area of special county value. The parkland extends to 251.5 hectares. The parish contains part of the large mixed woodland of Moss Wood (centred on SJ542501), as well as Long Plantation (SJ548514), Marl Piece (SJ546506), Garden Covert (SJ550518), Nevill's Wood (SJ548521), Coronation Wood (SJ542523) and several unnamed smaller woods and plantations. There are two large lakes, Chapel Mere (SJ539518) and Deer Park Mere (SJ540508), as well as several smaller meres. Chapel Mere has been designated as a Site of Special Scientific Interest. The high point is 125 metres on Castle Hill in Cholmondeley Park, at SJ532514. The River Weaver runs through the parish from the north west to the south east.

The A49 runs north–south through the parish. Other through routes include an unclassified road running broadly east–west, crossing the A49 at SJ552504, which connects with the settlements of Bickerton, Chorley and Wrenbury.

The land use is predominantly agricultural, with cattle pasture and some arable land. Cholmondeley Park supports rare-breed cattle, sheep and goats, including longhorn cattle. The Bankhouse horse-racing stables are in the parish. Cholmondeley Castle gardens are a tourist attraction.

== Demography ==
In 2006, the total population of the civil parish was estimated as 130. The 2001 census recorded a population of 136, in 63 households. The population has decreased since 1951; the historical population figures were 292 (1801), 269 (1851), 298 (1901) and 266 (1951).

== Cholmondeley Castle and Park ==
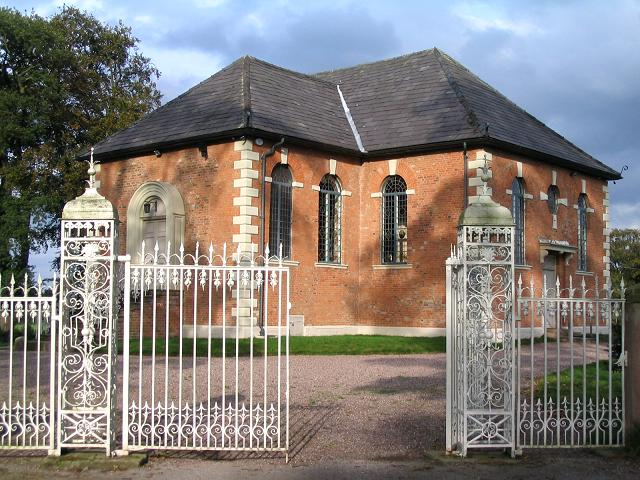
St Nicholas' Chapel and south gates

Cholmondeley Castle is a grade-II*-listed castellated mansion house located at SJ536513, four miles (six kilometres) from Malpas and 7 1/4 miles (11.5 kilometres) from Nantwich. The sandstone building dates from 1801 to 1804; turrets and towers were added in 1817–19 by Robert Smirke to give the "castle" its present appearance. The surviving parts of the grade-II-listed Old Hall date from 1707; the hall formerly included an Elizabethan building which was demolished in 1801.

Parkland

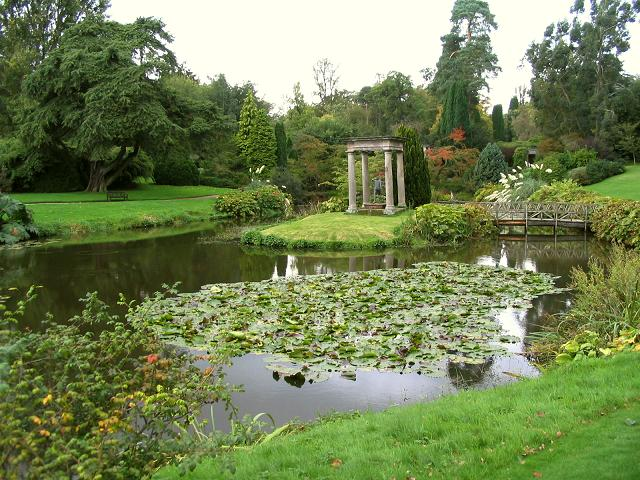
Temple Gardens

The parkland of the castle was originally laid out in the late 17th century, and is included in the National Register of Historic Parks and Gardens (grade II). The gates at the south-west entrance to the park date from 1722 and are listed at grade II*. The castle gardens contain several grade-II-listed structures; Temple Gardens has a sandstone temple, a lead statue of three winged cherubs supporting a flower basket, a rotunda, a stone bridge over a lily pond carved with dolphins and a gated entrance; the stone bridge across Chapel Mere is also listed.

Chapel

The castle's private chapel, dedicated to St Nicholas, is of a much earlier date and is listed at grade I. The original timber-framed building dates from the late 15th century; it was rebuilt in brick in 1717 by John Vanbrugh and extended during the 19th century. John Betjeman suggests that the attribution to Vanbrugh is incorrect since Thomas Fetherston contracted for the work in 1716. The transepts were added in 1829. The chancel roof is medieval and the furniture of the chancel is of about 1552. The north and south gates to the chapel date from 1722 and were formerly fences to the Old Hall; they are listed at grade II.

Gate lodges

The park has five grade-II-listed gate lodges, Beeston Lodge, Deer Park Lodge, Nantwich Lodge, Park House Lodge and Somerset Lodge. Other estate buildings also listed at grade II include Castle Farm House, Park House, Scotch Farm, Shingles Cottages and The Mews.

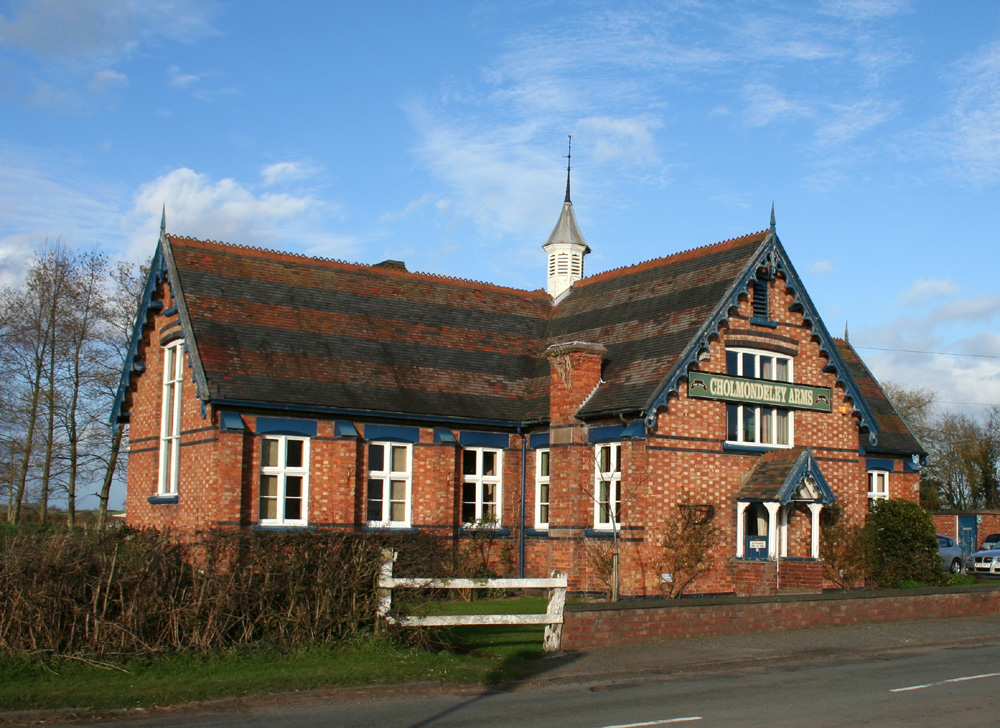
Cholmondeley Arms

== Other landmarks ==
The Cholmondeley Arms public house, a converted schoolhouse on the A49 at SJ552505, is included in the Good Pubs Guide. The Cholmondeley Castle Farm Shop, in the Castle Farm House at SJ531513, sells produce from the Cholmondeley Estate and incorporates a post office.

The grade-II-listed Field's Farmhouse (SJ554507) dates originally from 1648 and was restored in 1903. A three-bay farmhouse with timber framing and brick infilling, it features jetties and close studding with a middle rail. Higginsfield House (SJ557522) was formerly the Cholmondeley Estate's dower house; a five-bay, two-storey, white-painted brick house with a projecting porch, it dates from the early 19th century and is listed at grade II.

== Education ==
Cholmondeley civil parish falls within the catchment areas of Bickerton Holy Trinity CE Primary School in Bickerton and Bishop Heber High School in Malpas.

== See also ==
- Listed buildings in Cholmondeley, Cheshire
- List of civil parishes in England
