= Cholmley =

Cholmley is a surname. Notable people with the surname include:

- Ralph Cholmley, MP
- Henry Cholmley
- Henry Cholmley (died 1616), MP
- Richard Cholmley
- Sir George Strickland, 7th Baronet, also known as George Cholmley

== See also ==
- Cholmondeley (disambiguation)
- Cholmeley (disambiguation)
