= Chumley =

Chumley may refer to:

- Bill Chumley, American politician
- Donald Chumley (born 1962), American football player
- Heidi Chumley, American primary care physician and academic administrator
- Chumley Huffington, a character in Yu-Gi-Oh! GX
- Chumley, a walrus from the animated series Tennessee Tuxedo and His Tales
- Chumley, a troll from Robert Asprin's MythAdventures series
- Dr. Chumley, in the play Harvey
- Bernard Chumley, a character from the sketch comedy show Little Britain
- Lyle Chumley, character in Under the Dome

== See also ==
- Cholmondeley (disambiguation), pronounced the same
- Chulmleigh (disambiguation)
- Andrew Chumbley, English practitioner of magic and witchcraft
- Chumley's, a pub in New York City
- Chumlee (born Austin Lee Russell), a pawn shop employee on the TV show Pawn Stars
- Chun-Li, a player character from the Street Fighter fighting game franchise
