= Listed buildings in Chorley, Cholmondeley =

Chorley, Cholmondeley is a civil parish in Cheshire East, England. It contains four buildings that are recorded in the National Heritage List for England as designated listed buildings, all of which are at Grade II. This grade is the lowest of the three gradings given to listed buildings and is applied to "buildings of national importance and special interest". The parish is entirely rural, the listed buildings consisting of two farmhouses, a cottage, and a former bridewell converted into a house.

Name and location	Photograph	Date	Notes
Caldecott Farm House; 53.05740°N 2.63297°W	—	Early 17th century	The farmhouse is timber-framed at the rear, and in brick at the front, and has a slate roof. It is in two storeys, and has a three-bay front. A single-storey, two-bay wing gives the house an L-shaped plan. The windows are casements, those in the upper floor being in half-dormers with timber gables.
The Round House; 53.05482°N 2.63713°W	—	Late 18th century	Originating as a bridewell, it was later converted into a house. The building is in brick with a slate roof, it has an octagonal plan, and is in two storeys. There are windows on five of the faces, and doors on two. The windows are casements. Internally, the rooms radiate from the centre.
Breeze Hill Farm House; 53.05302°N 2.65262°W	—	Early 19th century	The farmhouse is in brick with a slate roof. It has two storeys, a three-three-bay front, and a rear wing giving it an L-shaped plan. In the ground floor are three-light lattice windows with wedge lintels. The upper floor contains two-light lattice windows in gables and in half-dormers with bargeboards and finials.
Chorley Bank Cottage; 53.05303°N 2.65606°W	—	Early 19th century	A brick cottage with a slate roof, it is in a single storey with an attic, and has a two-bay front. The windows are mullioned and transomed. There is a full-length lean-to at the back with a casement window.

== See also ==
- Listed buildings in Cholmondeley, Cheshire
- Listed buildings in Faddiley
- Listed buildings in Baddiley
- Listed buildings in Wrenbury cum Frith
