= Cholmondeley Castle =

Country house in the civil parish of Cholmondeley, Cheshire, England

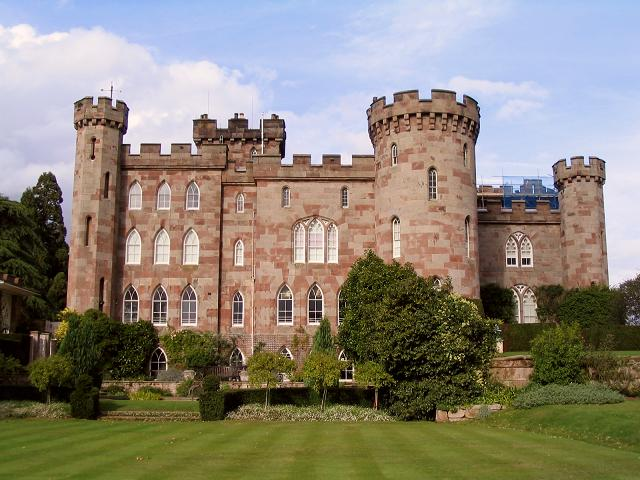
- Cholmondeley Castle from the south

- Location in Cheshire
- 53.0572°N 2.6932°W
- OS grid reference: SJ 536 513

History
- Built: 1801–04
- Built for: George Cholmondeley, 1st Marquess of Cholmondeley

Site notes
- Architect(s): William Turner, Robert Smirke

Listed Building – Grade II*
- Designated: 10 June 1952
- Reference no.: 1135794

Cholmondeley Castle is a country house in the civil parish of Cholmondeley, Cheshire, England. Together with its adjacent formal gardens, it is surrounded by parkland. The site of the house has been a seat of the Cholmondeley family since the 12th century. The present house replaced a timber-framed hall nearby. It was built at the start of the 19th century for George Cholmondeley, 1st Marquess of Cholmondeley, who designed most of it himself in the form of a crenellated castle. After the death of the Marquess, the house was extended to designs by Robert Smirke to produce the building in its present form. The house is designated by English Heritage as a Grade II* listed building.

The first formal garden was designed in the 17th century by George London. Following neglect in the 18th century, the garden was re-ordered by William Emes, who also created the landscape park. During the 20th century the garden was further developed under the care of Lavinia, widow of the late 6th Marquess. The park and gardens are listed Grade II in the Register of Historic Parks and Gardens. In the park and gardens are a number of other listed buildings. The most important of these is St Nicholas Chapel, which dates from the 13th century and contains much 17th-century furniture. It is listed Grade I in the National Heritage List for England. Standing across the main drive is a wrought iron screen and gateway made by Robert Bakewell in 1722 for the Old Hall and moved here in the early 19th century. This is listed as Grade II*. The other Grade II listed buildings include the altered remains of the Old Hall, five of the lodges in and around the estate and a variety of structures in the gardens.

During the Second World War, the house and grounds were used for a variety of military purposes which included a hospital. Until her death in November 2015, the house was occupied by Lavinia, Dowager Marchioness of Cholmondeley, mother of the present Marquess who lives in the other family seat, Houghton Hall in Norfolk. The house is not open to the public, but the park and gardens are open during the summer season. A variety of events are organised in the grounds and one of the lodges can be used as a holiday cottage.

== History ==
=== Old Hall ===
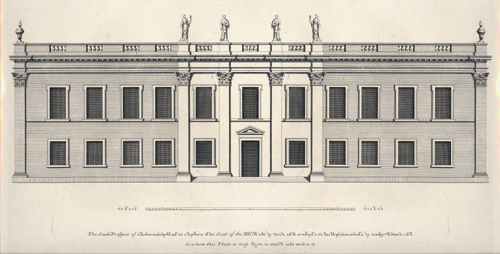
Old Hall

The site of the house has been a family seat of the Cholmondeley family since the 12th century. In the 16th century the house was a timber-framed hall standing on a moated platform. During the English Civil War in the following century, the house and its separate chapel were damaged by the Parliamentarians and were subsequently repaired by Robert Cholmondeley, 1st Earl of Leinster. In 1701 Hugh Cholmondeley, 1st Earl of Cholmondeley commissioned William Smith of Warwick to encase the house with brick and to add features such as giant columns and balustraded parapets with urns and statues. By 1712 the earl had lost patience with Smith and asked John Vanbrugh to prepare a new design, but it was never executed. In 1722 wrought iron gates and railings made by Robert Bakewell were used to enclose the forecourt of the house. In the 18th century the house was neglected. In 1770 it was inherited by George Cholmondeley, the 4th Earl of Cholmondeley, (Note: George Cholmondeley was created 1st Earl of Cholmondeley in 1815.) who decided to demolish most of the Old Hall and to replace it with a new building.

=== Present house ===
Building of the new house in the style of a castle began in 1801. It was designed mainly by the Earl in collaboration with the architect William Turner of Whitchurch, Shropshire. The design was symmetrical; the entrance front facing west and consisting of two castellated blocks, between which was a single-storey loggia. Behind the loggia was the full-height entrance hall. Facing the park on the east side of the house were the three main state rooms. This phase of building the house was completed in 1805. Much of the construction material was recycled from the old house, including bricks, glass, windows, woodwork and chimneypieces. Bakewell's railings, without the gates, were moved to form a screen on the main drive. In 1817 George Cholmondeley (now the 1st Marquess) started a series of enlargements to the house beginning with a new dining room. Two years later, a family wing with tall rectangular tower was added to the south of the house; both of these additions were designed by the Marquess. They were followed by the addition of two octagonal angle turrets. The Marquess died in 1828 and soon after that, Robert Smirke was commissioned to make further additions and alterations. The main addition was a round tower at the southeast corner of the family wing. Smirke also brought forward the central tower of the east front by adding a canted bay, giving the house its present appearance. This work was completed in 1829.

=== Later history ===
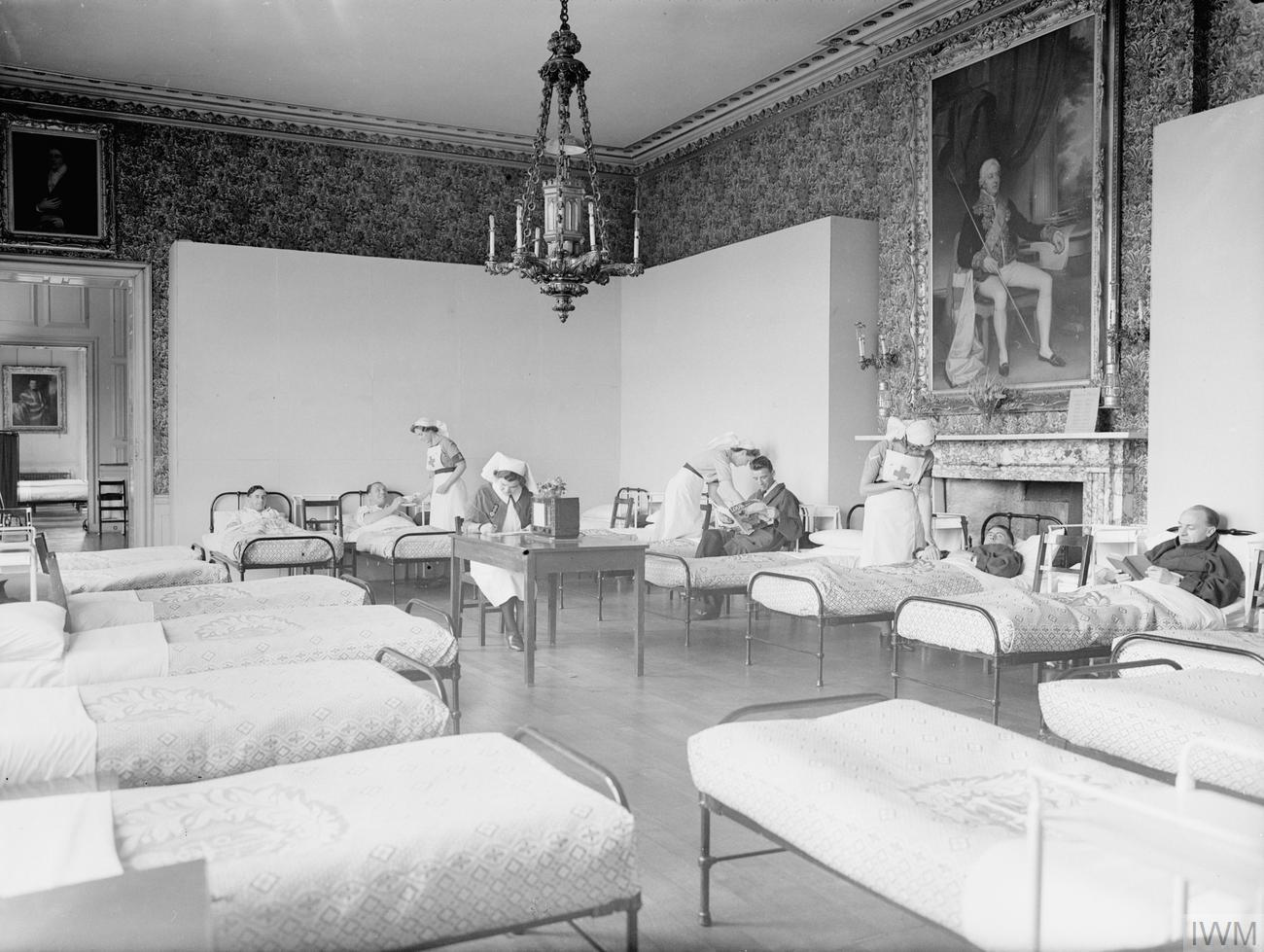
The building in use as a Royal Naval Auxiliary Hospital

In common with many other country estates and stately homes, special roles were allocated to Cholmondeley during the Second World War. Between July and October 1940 the grounds were the home of troops serving the Czechoslovak government-in-exile. Later they were used in the preparations for Operation Anthropoid, an assassination attempt on Reinhard Heydrich. Cholmondeley was also employed as a Royal Naval Auxiliary Hospital which treated serving servicemen suffering from severe nervous conditions.

The house was designated a Grade II* listed building on 10 June 1952. The current Marquess, David Cholmondeley, 7th Marquess, does not live at Cholmondeley but at the other family seat, Houghton Hall in Norfolk. Until her death in November 2015, Cholmondeley Castle was occupied by his mother, Lavinia. (Note: Lavinia Cholmondeley died in November 2015.)

== Architecture ==
=== Exterior ===
The house is constructed in sandstone with roofs of slate and lead. It is mainly in two storeys with a basement, and has towers rising to a greater height. The entire building has a battlemented parapet. The entrance front faces west and consists of two three-storey wings in three bays with a single-storey three-bay loggia between them. The windows in the lateral blocks have Gothic-style arches and contain Y-tracery. In the loggia the windows each have two lights under almost circular heads. Above and behind the loggia the upper storeys of the entrance hall also contain Y-tracery. On the right side of the entrance front is a square five-storey tower, which is linked to an octagonal turret containing arrow slits. The garden front, facing east, has octagonal corner turrets between which is a large canted bay window which rises up to form a half-tower. The section to the left of this faces south and is in two storeys with three bays. It contains French windows and windows with trefoil heads containing Y-tracery. There is then a two-storey two-bay section and finally Smirke's service wing with its large round tower containing arrow slits.

=== Interior ===
The loggia leads into the double-height entrance hall. This has blind arcades on the side walls. Opposite the entrance is an open arcade leading to a north–south passage. Beyond this is the ante-room with its large, canted bay window. This room has a simple dentil cornice. To the north of it is the dining room with a marble mantlepiece, a cornice decorated with gilded flowers and leaves and, in the ceiling, rosettes with a large central rose with a chandelier. To the south of the ante-room is the drawing room. Here the cornice is decorated with arrows pointing downward and there is a central rose with a chandelier. Leading from the drawing room is the staircase hall with an open-well staircase. The hall is top-lit from a timber lantern and the stairs are in black marble. The wrought iron balustrade on the stairs and landing was made by Robert Bakewell and moved from the Old Hall. The handrail is in rosewood. To the south of the staircase hall is the nursery suite and the library. The Bird Room, between the staircase and the drawing room, contains a collection of muniments. The arrangement of rooms and corridors in the upper rooms is complex. The kitchens and domestic offices are in the basement.

== Grounds ==
=== Chapel ===
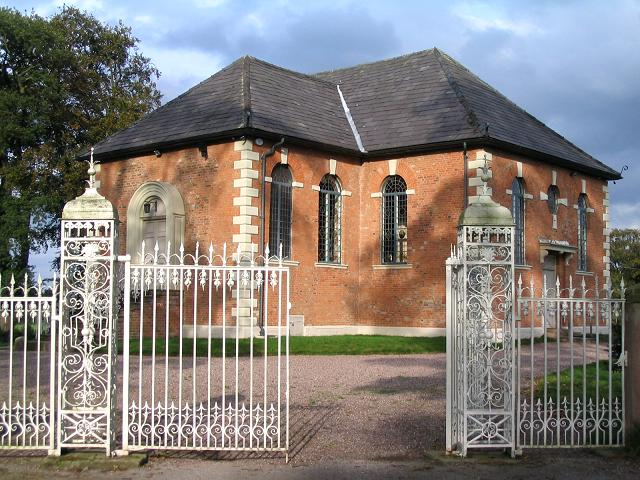
St Nicholas Chapel

The Grade I listed chapel originated as a timber-framed structure in the 13th century. It was encased in brick and extended in 1717 and further additions were made in 1829 and 1840. It has a slate roof and is in a cruciform plan. Much of its furniture dates from the 17th century. The Cholmondeley family pew is at the west end, in an elevated position.

=== Gardens and park ===
The first formal gardens were established in the 17th century by Hugh Cholmondeley, 1st Earl of Cholmondeley. These were in the French formal garden style, containing canals and alleés. The gardens were designed by George London, and included gates and railings by Jean Tijou and statues by Jan van Nost. Following neglect in the 18th century, the 4th Earl employed William Emes to re-model the gardens. Emes converted the formal garden into a landscape park, planting large numbers of trees and creating lakes. Further development of the gardens was carried out by John Webb, a student of Emes, who probably designed the terrace immediately around the house. Since the middle of the 20th century and until her death, the gardens were in the care of Lavinia, the Dowager Marchioness, who improved them and added additional features.

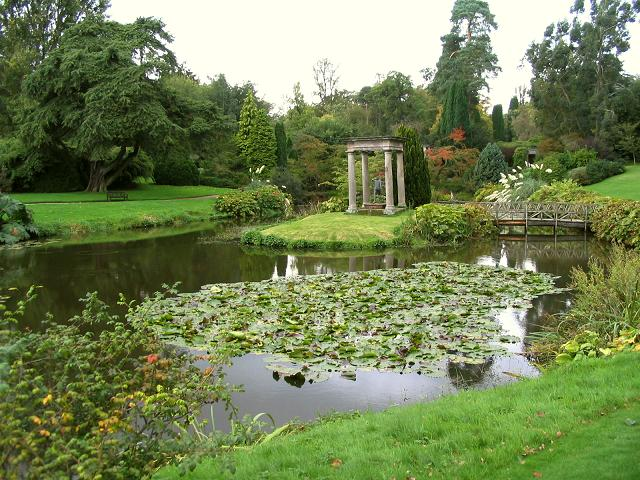
Temple Garden

The house is surrounded by a terrace, to the south of which are three interlinked gardens: the Silver Garden, the Lily Pool Garden and an area containing a swimming pool. Beyond are lawns, groups of specimen trees and shrubs, gravelled paths and a walled garden. A major feature is the Temple Garden which contains an irregular pool within which are two small islands. On one of the islands is a structure in the form of a temple. At the west end of the garden is a rotunda. To the northwest of the Temple Garden is the Rose Garden. Beyond the gardens is a park, which is mainly grassland with some trees. Features in the park include a ha-ha and two lakes; Chapel Mere and Deer Park Mere. Since 10 June 1985 the gardens and park have been listed as Grade II in the Register of Historic Parks and Gardens. The area covered by the designation amounts to about 240 ha.

== Listed buildings ==
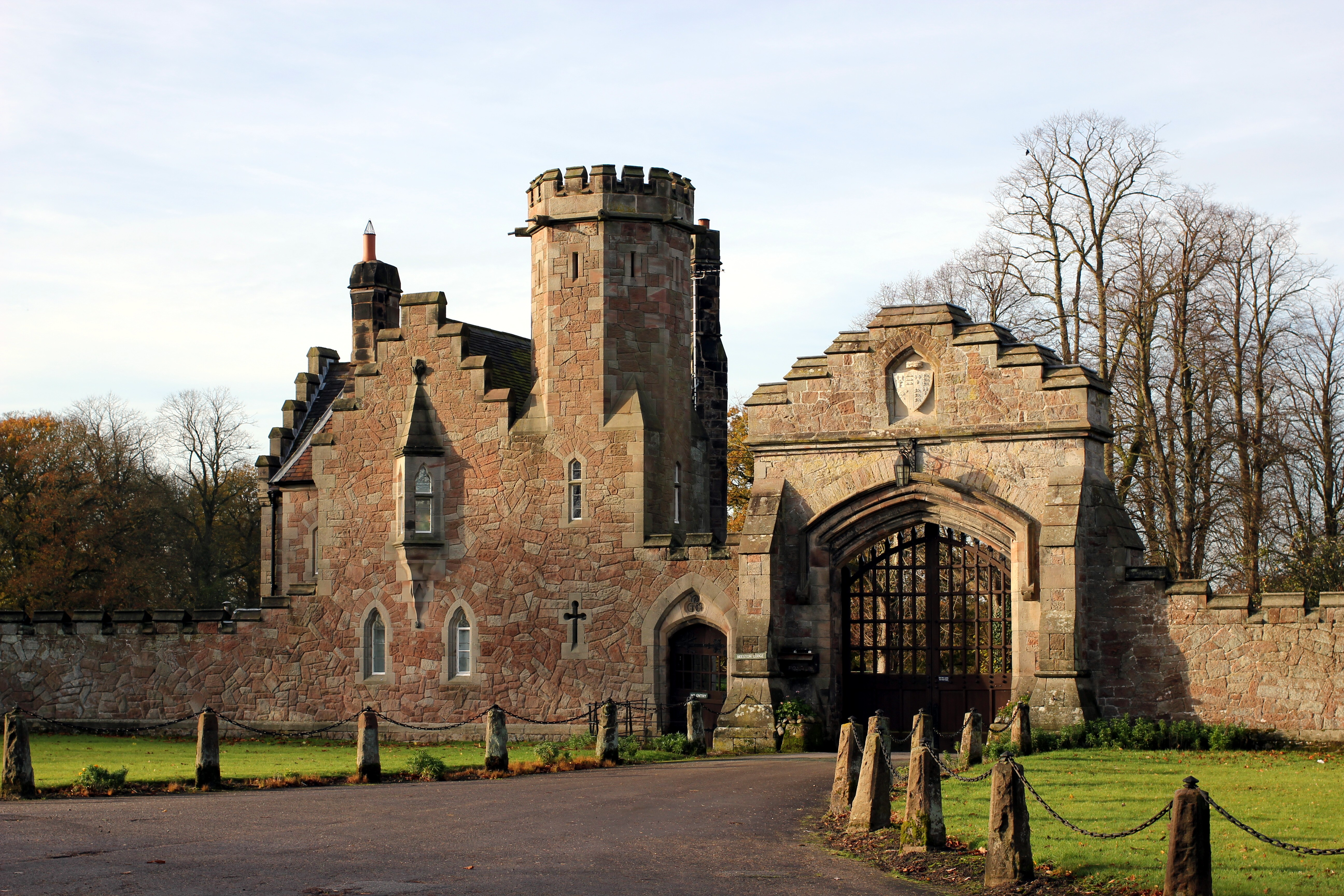
Beeston Lodge

In addition to the house being listed Grade II* and the chapel Grade I, there are other listed structures associated with the house. Richard Bakewell's screen, standing across the main drive, is listed as Grade II*. All the other listed buildings are designated Grade II. Of these, five are associated with the Temple Garden: the temple itself, the rotunda, the bridge over the pond with its parapets consisting of stone dolphins, a sculpture in lead by van Nost depicting three cherubs, and the gated entrance, possibly by Jean Tijou. The north and south gates of the chapel enclosure, made by Bakewell in 1722 and installed in 1829, are both listed. Of the five lodges associated with the castle, three of them that lie within the grounds are listed: Dee Park Lodge, on the southeast approach to the castle; Park House Lodge, on the north approach; and Somerset Lodge, a gatehouse on the east approach, designed by S. S. Teulon. The other two lodges stand at the entrances to the grounds: Nantwich Lodge, at the original south entrance, and Beeston Lodge, a lodge and gateway at the east approach. The remaining listed buildings are the reduced and altered remains of the Old Hall, the Mews adapted from the former stables, Park House and Scotch Farm developed from the original stables. A bridge on the east approach to the house is also listed.

== Present day ==
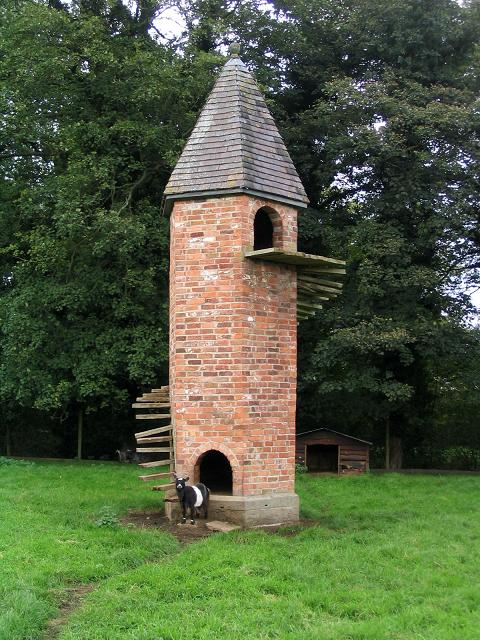
Goat tower on grounds

The house is not open to visitors but during the summer season the gardens are open to the public. Available facilities include tea rooms, picnic and play areas, and a nature trail. Visitors can see a variety of farm animals in the stables and paddocks. During the summer season a programme of events is organised, including an annual Pageant of Power. Somerset Lodge is available for use as a holiday cottage. The Cheshire Hunt Hounds meet here occasionally.

== See also ==
- Listed buildings in Cholmondeley, Cheshire
- Peckforton Castle (another country house in Cheshire in the form of a castle)

== Notes and references ==
Notes

Citations

Sources

- de Figueiredo, Peter; Treuherz, Julian (1988), Cheshire Country Houses, Chichester: Phillimore, ISBN 0-85033-655-4
- Groves, Linden (2004), Historic Parks & Gardens of Cheshire, Ashbourne: Landmark, ISBN 1-84306-124-4
- Hartwell, Clare; Hyde, Matthew; Hubbard, Edward; Pevsner, Nikolaus (2011) [1971], Cheshire, The Buildings of England, New Haven and London: Yale University Press, ISBN 978-0-300-17043-6
- Richards, Raymond (1947), Old Cheshire Churches, London: Batsford, OCLC 719918
