= St Margaret's Church, Wrenbury =

Coordinates: 53.0257°N 2.6073°W

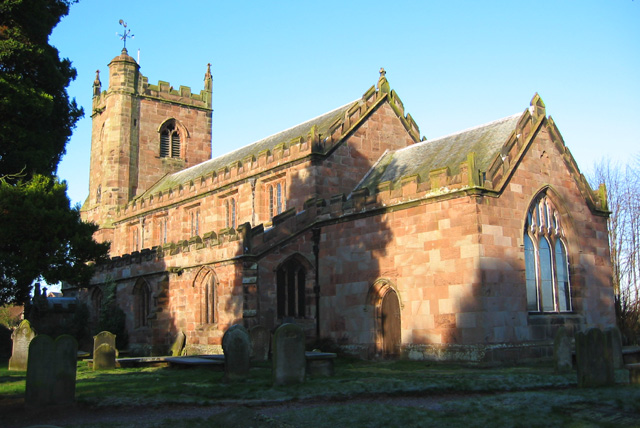
- St Margaret's Church, Wrenbury, from the southeast

- Location in Cheshire
- OS grid reference: SJ 594 477
- Location: Wrenbury, Cheshire
- Country: England
- Denomination: Anglican
- Website: St Margaret, Wrenbury

Architecture
- Heritage designation: Grade II*
- Designated: 12 January 1967
- Architectural type: Church
- Style: Gothic

Specifications
- Materials: Red sandstone ashlar Tiled roof

Administration
- Province: York
- Diocese: Chester
- Archdeaconry: Nantwich
- Deanery: Macclesfield
- Parish: Wrenbury

Clergy
- Vicar: Revd Amanda Pike

St Margaret's Church overlooks the village green of Wrenbury, Cheshire, England. The church is recorded in the National Heritage List for England as a designated Grade II* listed building. It is an active Anglican parish church in the diocese of Chester, the archdeaconry of Macclesfield and the deanery of Nantwich. Its benefice is combined with those of St Michael's, Baddiley and St Mary's and St Michael's, Burleydam.

== History ==
This was originally a chapel of ease to St Mary's Church, Acton. The present church dates from the early 16th century with alterations and additions in the 18th and 19th centuries; the nave and porch were restored in 1794, the chancel was rebuilt in 1806 and restored in 1865.

== Architecture ==
=== Exterior ===
The church is built of red sandstone ashlar with a tile roof. Its plan consists of a west tower, a five-bay clerestoried nave with narrow aisles, a chancel, and a south porch. The tower is embattled with pinnacles at the corners. The west door has been converted into a window and above this is another, three-light, window. The upper bell openings are of two lights, and protruding from the southeast angle is an octagonal stair turret climbing to the roof of the tower.

=== Interior ===
The tie-beam roof of the nave, which includes bosses, dates from the late 16th century. The nave contains box pews, many of them having the arms of local families on their doors. The pew nearest the door was for the dog whipper who, in addition to controlling dogs in the church, had the duty of waking those who fell asleep during the sermon. The pulpit is early Georgian, and the west gallery dates from the late 18th century. The parish chest is in the tower, it is over 6 feet (2 m) long, and is secured by 14 iron straps. The elaborate brass chandelier was presented to the church in 1839. The font is made from sandstone. The parish registers begin in 1593 and the churchwardens' accounts in 1771.

==== Monuments ====
Monuments in the church commemorate the Cotton family of Combermere Abbey as well as the Starkey family of Wrenbury Hall. The following monuments can be seen in St Margaret's today:

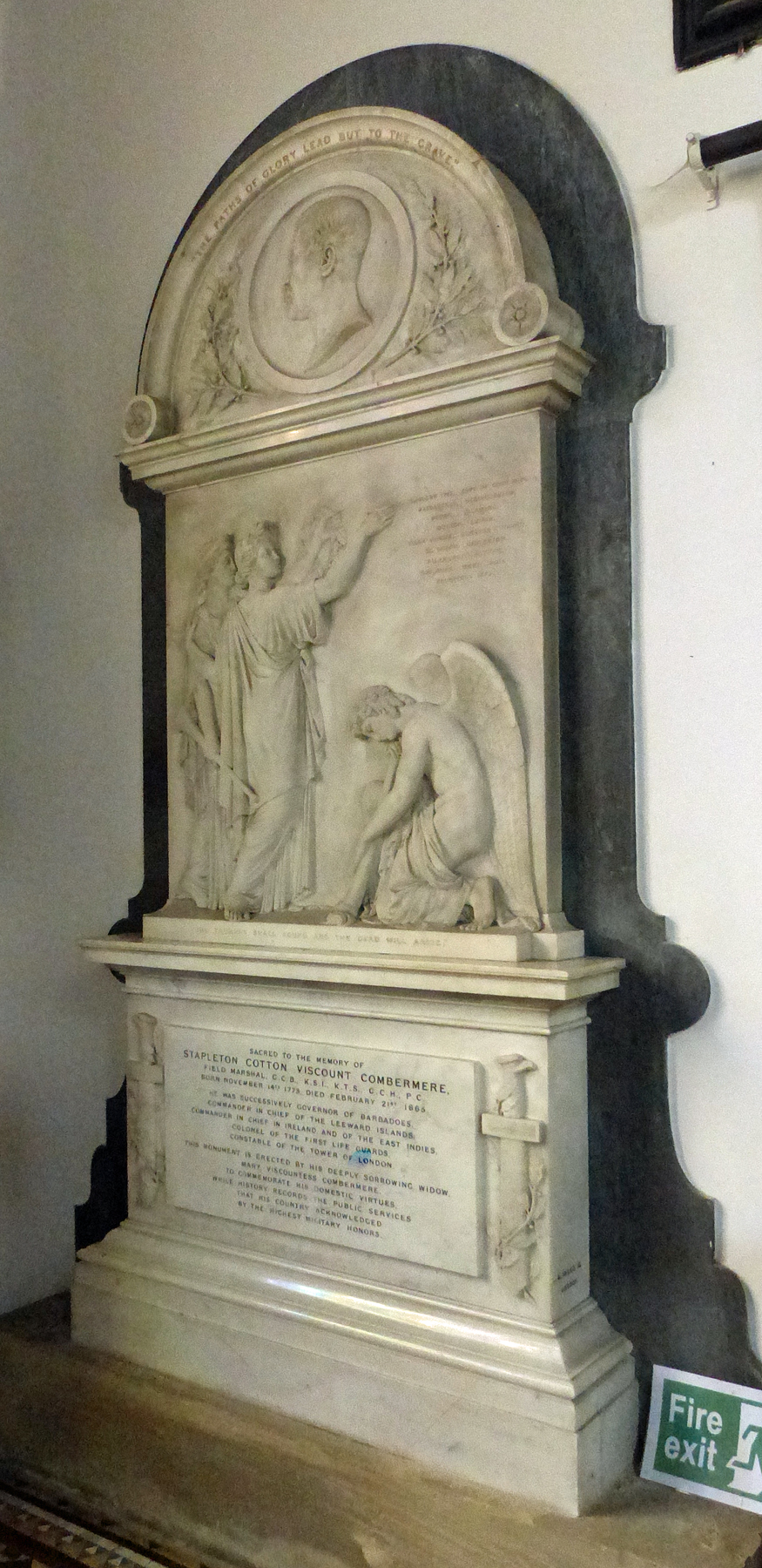
Memorial to Field Marshal Stapleton Cotton, 1st Viscount Combermere (died 1865)

- Wall tablet commemorating George Cotton, son of Sir Robert Cotton, 1st Bt, and Hugh-Calvely Cotton (died 1702), an infant son of Sir Thomas Cotton, 2nd Bt and his wife Philadelphia (died 1707). Simple wooden tablet with long inscription, surmounted by painted Cotton family coat of arms.
- Wall tablet commemorating various members of the Starkey family: Lawrence (died 1611); Arthur, his father (died 1622); Arthur, his son (died 1641); the latter's sons Arthur (died 1641) and Thomas (died 1641). The memorial further mentions George (died 1641), son of George; Charles, Peter (died 1663), Arthur (died 1688) and George (died 1666), the four sons of John; John (died 1700), interred at Great Budworth; Richard (died 1700), Thomas (died 1707) and Thomas (died 1713), the three sons of Thomas (died 1714). Simple wooden tablet with long inscription, surmounted by painted Starkey family coat of arms.
- Monument to Thomas Starkey (died 1802). White marble sculpture on black marble backing, by John Bacon Jr.
- Monument to John Jennings (died 1808). White marble sculpture on black marble backing, also by John Bacon Jr, and erected by John Jennings' sister Eleanor, the wife of Thomas Starkey (died 1802).
- Monument to Eleanor Starkey (1811), née Jennings, widow of Thomas Starkey (died 1802). White marble sculpture on black marble backing, also by John Bacon Jr.
- Monument to Field Marshal Stapleton Cotton, 1st Viscount Combermere (died 1865). Large white marble monument with black marble backing, signed W Theed of London.
- Wall tablet commemorating Wellington Stapleton-Cotton, 2nd Viscount Combermere (died 1891). Brass plaque with black marble backing, surmounted by engraved Cotton family coat of arms.

==== Organ ====
The organ was built by Charles Whiteley of Chester in 1884 and renovated by the same firm in 1984.

==== Bells ====
There is a ring of six bells. The oldest bells date from 1610 and 1666, one bell dated 1861 is by John Warner and Sons, and the remaining three were cast in 1902 by John Taylor and Company.

== External features ==
In the churchyard is a cast iron gravestone dating from the middle of the 19th century. The railings, gates and gatepiers to the churchyard are listed at Grade II, as is a cottage in the churchyard. The churchyard contains the Commonwealth war graves of a British Army soldier of World War I and a British soldier and airman of World War II.

== See also ==
- Grade II* listed buildings in Cheshire East
- Listed buildings in Wrenbury cum Frith
