= Chulmleigh (disambiguation) =

Chulmleigh is a market town and civil parish in North Devon, England.

Chulmleigh may also refer to:

- Chulmleigh (horse) (1934 – after 1957), a British Thoroughbred racehorse
- SS Chulmleigh, a British merchant ship of the mid-20th century
- Chulmleigh College, an 11–16 mixed secondary school with academy status in Chulmleigh, Devon, England

== See also ==
- Cholmondeley (disambiguation)
- Chumley (disambiguation)
