= Cholmeley =

Cholmeley is a surname. Notable people with the surname include:

- Cholmeley baronets created for people with the surname Cholmeley, one in the Baronetage of England and one in the Baronetage of the UK
- James Cholmeley Russell (1841–1912), barrister, financier, property developer and Welsh railway entrepreneur
- Roger Cholmeley (c. 1485 – 1565), Lord Chief Justice of the Court of King's Bench from 1552 to 1553
- Sir Cholmeley Dering, 4th Baronet (1679–1711), English politician and duellist
- Sir Hugh Cholmeley, 1st Baronet (1600–1657), Member of Parliament (MP) and Royalist leader during the English Civil War
- Sir Hugh Cholmeley, 3rd Baronet DL, JP (1839–1904), British soldier and politician
- Sir Hugh Cholmeley, 4th Baronet (1632–1689), English politician and baronet
- Sir Montague Cholmeley, 1st Baronet (1772–1831), British politician and baronet
- Sir Montague Cholmeley, 2nd Baronet (1802–1874), British politician and baronet

== See also ==
- Cholmley (disambiguation)
- Cholmondeley (disambiguation)
