= St Nicholas Chapel, Cholmondeley =

Coordinates: 53.0601°N 2.6808°W

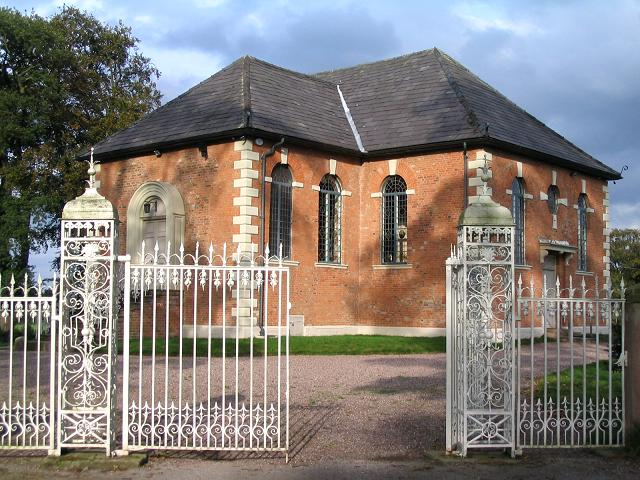
- St Nicholas Chapel

- Location in Cheshire
- OS grid reference: SJ 536 514
- Location: Cholmondeley Castle, Cheshire
- Country: England
- Denomination: Anglican

History
- Status: Private chapel
- Founder: Marquess of Cholmondeley
- Dedication: Saint Nicholas

Architecture
- Heritage designation: Grade I
- Designated: 12 January 1967
- Architectural type: Chapel
- Style: Neoclassical

Specifications
- Materials: Red brick with slate roof

St Nicholas Chapel is a private chapel in the grounds of Cholmondeley Castle, Cheshire, England, the ancient seat of the Marquess of Cholmondeley, hereditary Lord Great Chamberlain of England. It is recorded in the National Heritage List for England as a designated Grade I listed building.

== History ==
This was originally a timber-framed chapel dating from the 13th century. It was damaged in the English Civil War and, because of this and because of general dilapidation, it was repaired in 1652 by Robert Cholmondeley, 1st Earl of Leinster. In 1717 the timber framing of the chancel was encased with brick and the rest of the chapel was rebuilt with brick and stone facings. Transepts were added in 1829 by George Cholmondeley, 2nd Marquess of Cholmondeley, and north and south galleries were added in 1840. Later in the 19th century George Gilbert Scott was asked to supply plans for the chapel's restoration, which included its demolition, apart from the chancel. The Marquess declined to follow these plans and instead repairs were conducted by workmen from the estate. Reverend Thomas Henry Sparshott was domestic chaplain here from 1879 to 1889.

== Architecture ==
=== Exterior ===
The chapel is built in red brick with a slate roof. It has a cruciform plan with a three-bay chancel and transepts, and a two-bay nave. It stands on a brick plinth with a moulded stone cornice and has rusticated quoins. The west entrance leads to the family pew and is approached up nine stone steps with an ornamental cast iron balustrade. The public entrances are at ground level into the north and south transepts.

=== Interior ===
The hammerbeam roof includes both blank and openwork tracery. The authors of the Buildings of England series consider that the 17th-century furnishings of the chapel are the most complete of their date in Cheshire. F. H. Crossley states that the chapel holds "the most valuable post-Reformation church furniture we possess in the country". The chancel is panelled in old oak. The screen dividing the chancel from the nave is carved in Tudor style. The reading desk, pulpit, altar rails and holy table all date from the time of the Commonwealth. Extending across and elevated above the west end of the nave is the Cholmondeley family pew, with steps descending to the nave. The stained glass includes many small Netherlandish roundels.

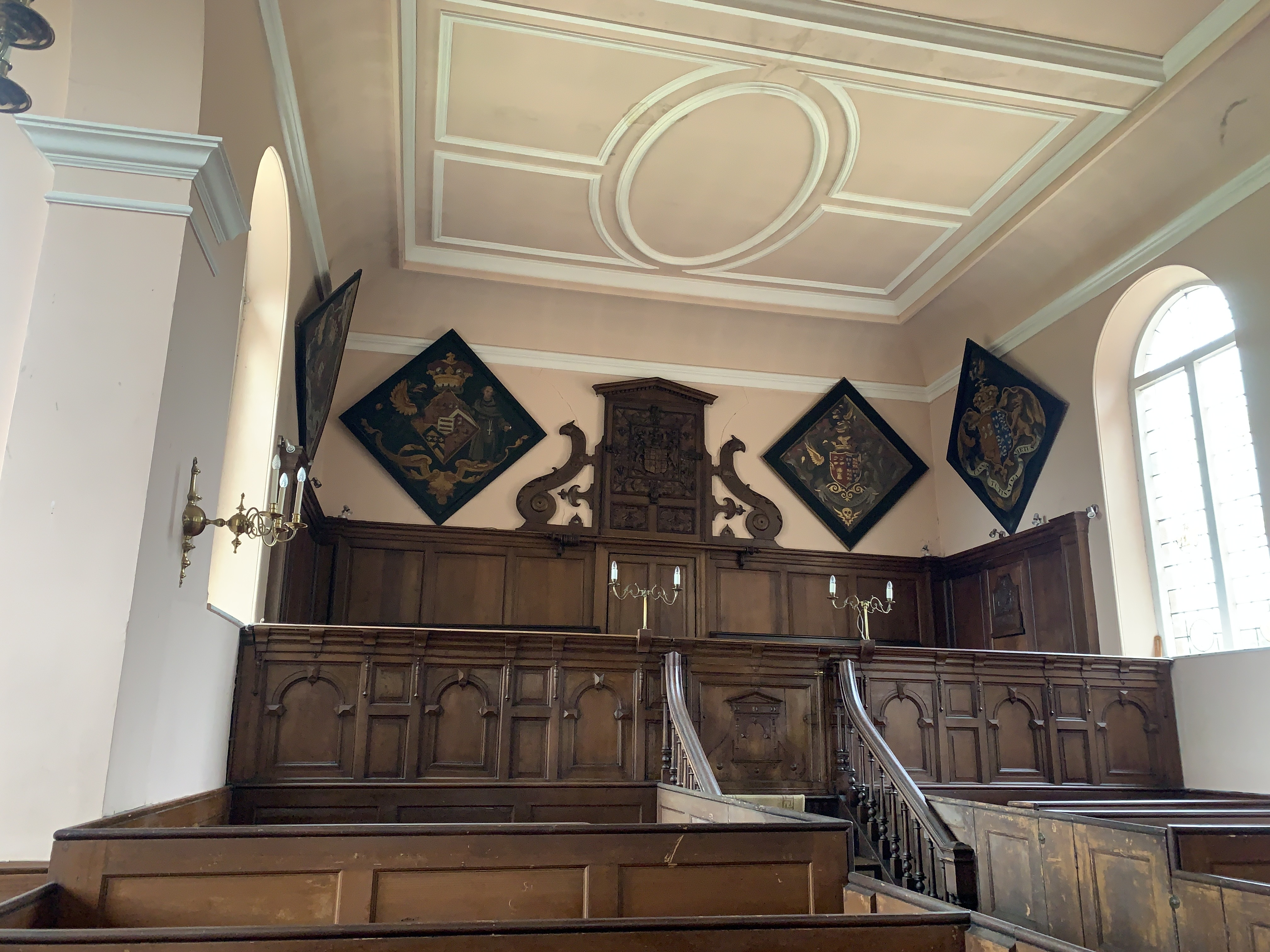
Cholmondeley Family Pew

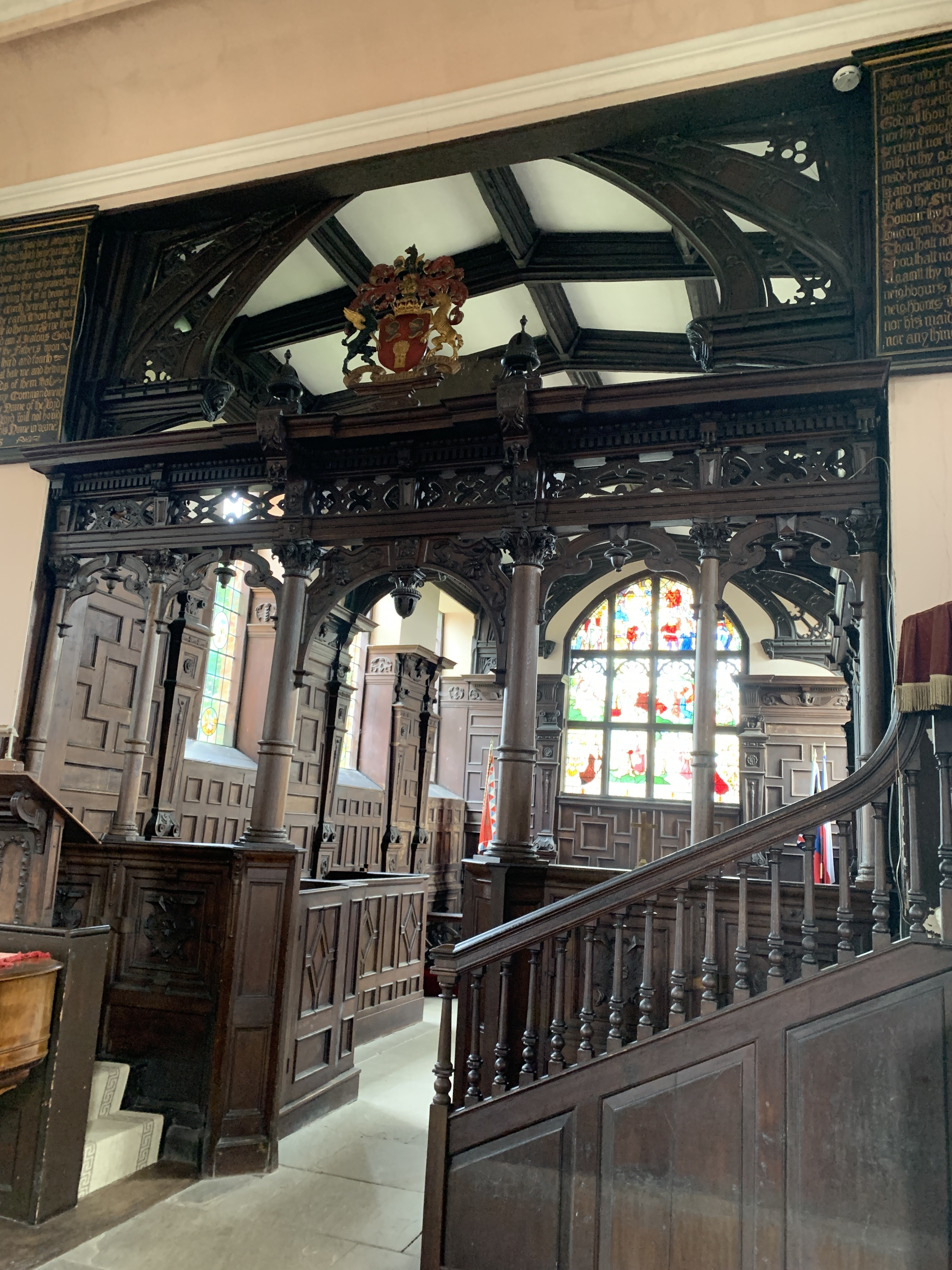
Altar of St Nicholas Church Cholmondeley

== External features ==
The wrought iron gates and railings to the north and south of the chapel were moved here from Cholmondeley Old Hall. They were made by the noted ironsmith Robert Bakewell and are Grade II listed.

== See also ==
- Grade I listed buildings in Cheshire East
- Grade I listed churches in Cheshire
- Listed buildings in Cholmondeley, Cheshire
