= Cholmondeley cello =

The Cholmondeley (/ˈtʃʌmli/ CHUM-lee) is the name of a Stradivarius cello (violin) that was made in Cremona, Italy, by Antonio Stradivari around 1698. It holds the record as the world's most valuable cello. At an auction at Sotheby's in London on 22 June 1988 it fetched the highest auction price ever at £682,000 (US$ 1.2 million). Purchase of the Cholmondeley surpassed the previous record for an instrument at auction (also in 1988) of $890,000, which was for Stradavarius violin named Marie Hall. Prior to the Marie Hall, the Bonjour Stradivarius was the record holder at $393,000, purchased in 1994 by Robert Cohen.
