= Listed buildings in Norbury, Cheshire =

Norbury is a former civil parish in Cheshire East, England. It contained five buildings that are recorded in the National Heritage List for England as designated listed buildings, all of which are at Grade II. This grade is the lowest of the three gradings given to listed buildings and is applied to "buildings of national importance and special interest". Other than small settlements, the parish was rural, and most of the listed buildings were houses. The Llangollen Canal ran through the parish, and one of its bridges is listed.

Name and location	Photograph	Date	Notes
Brook Farmhouse; 53.02284°N 2.65149°W		:Late 16th to early 17th century	The farmhouse was altered and extended in the 19th century. It is basically timber-framed with brick infill, and was later encased in brick. The roof is tiled, and the farmhouse is in two storeys with a four-bay front. The original two bays, on the right, have a central doorway with a gabled porch. The windows are casements.
The Holtridge; 53.03183°N 2.65515°W	—	Early 17th century	A farmhouse that was later extended, it is in brick with a tiled roof. It has a T-shaped plan, and is in two storeys with an attic. There is a canted oriel window on the north front, the other windows being casements.
Olive Cottage; 53.02897°N 2.67163°W	—	Mid 17th century	A house that was extended later in the 17th century. It is timber-framed with brick infill, has a thatched roof, and is in two storeys. On the front is a doorway with a gabled porch and windows, some in dormers. At the rear are more dormers and a canted bow window.
Stokes Cottage; 53.025771°N 2.676491°W		16th or early 17th century	A single-storey timber-framed cottage with brick infill and a thatched roof.
Church Bridge; 53.01350°N 2.65398°W	—	Late 18th to early 19th century	A bridge carrying School Lane over the Llangollen Canal. It is built in sandstone and consists of a single round arch with voussoirs. There are retaining walls on both sides.
