= Jean Tijou =

French Huguenot Ironworker

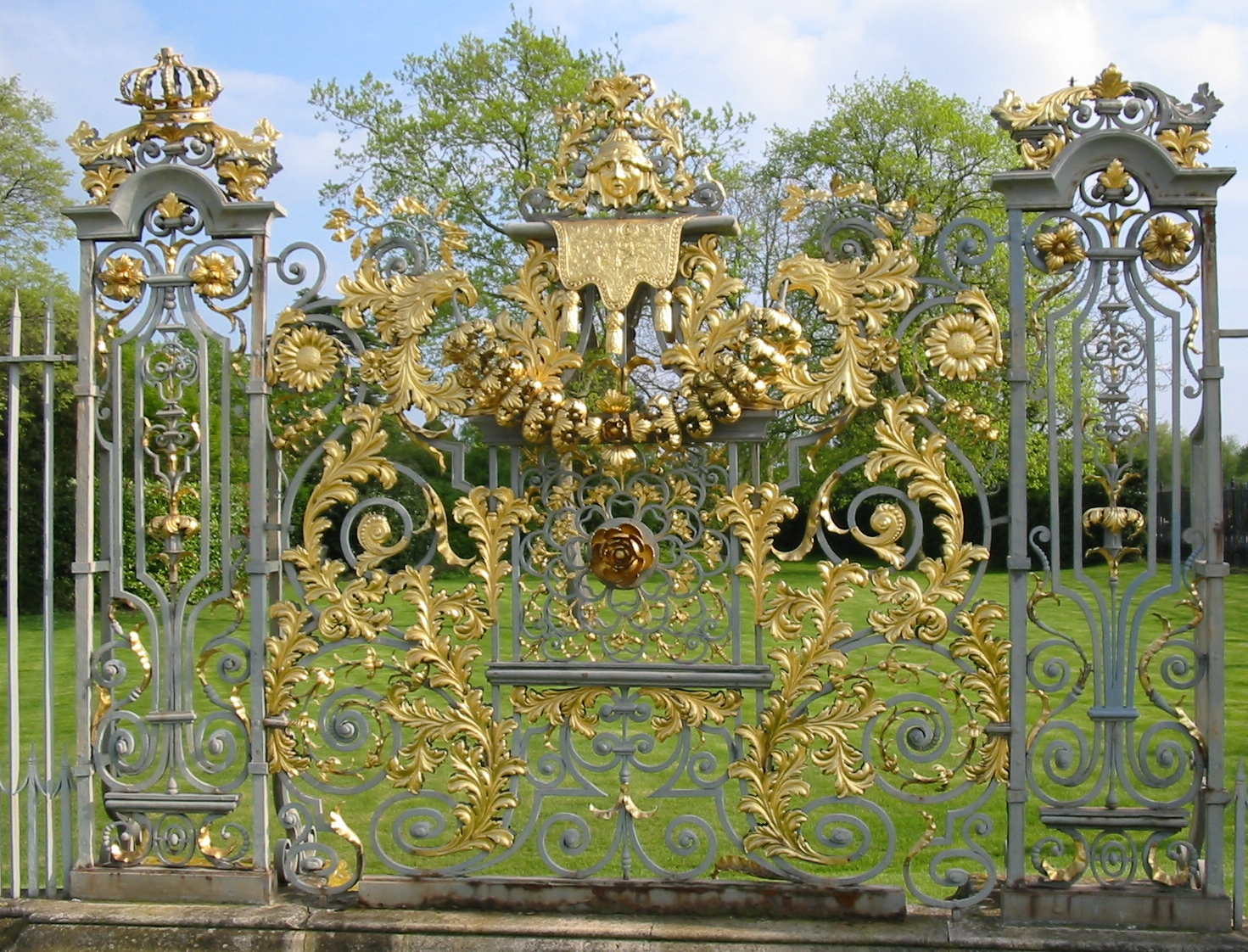
Hampton Court Palace, screen representing England, c. 1700

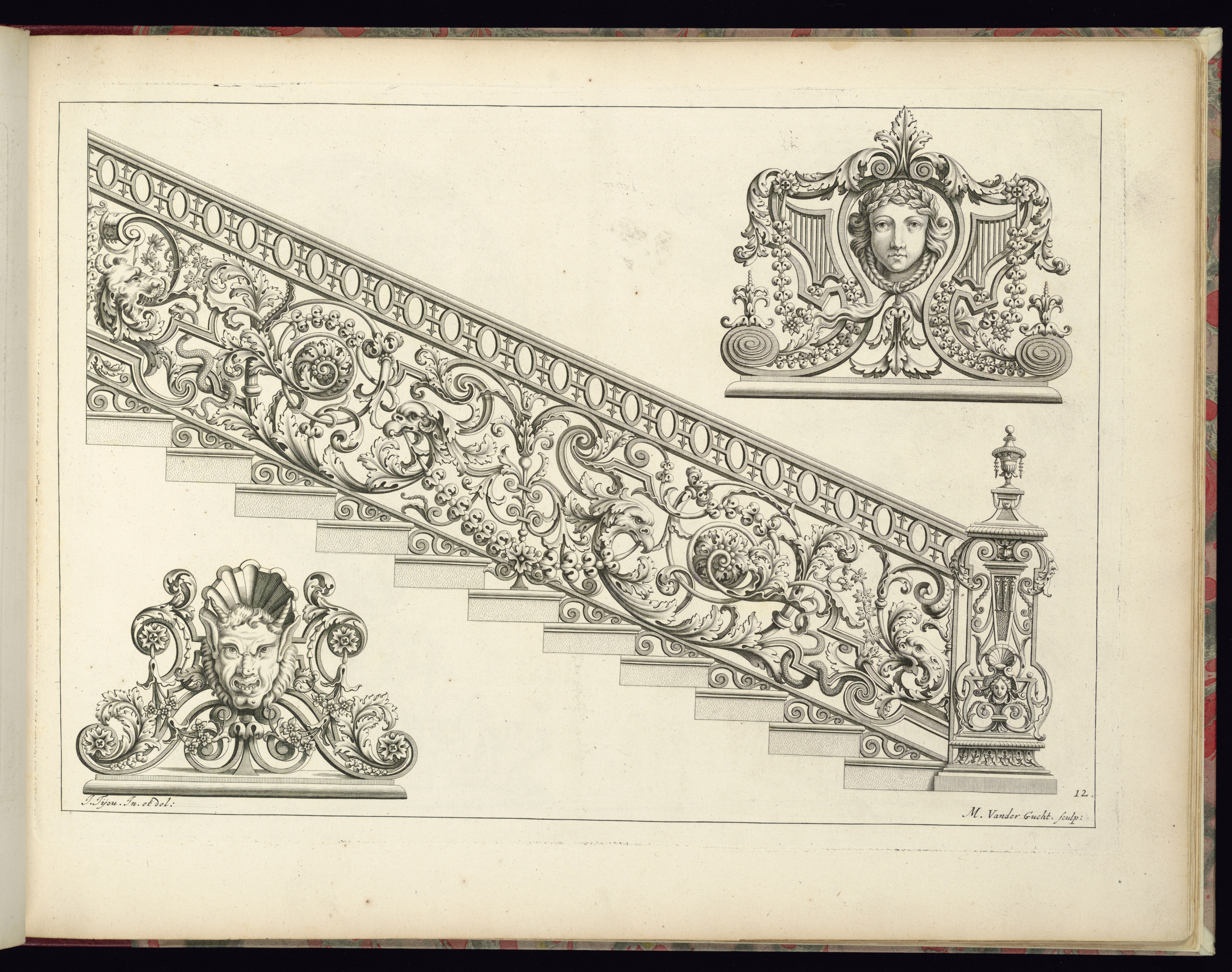
Plate from his New Book of Drawings, 1693

Jean Tijou (fl. 1689–1712) was a French Huguenot ironworker. He is known solely through his work in England, where he worked on several of the key English Baroque buildings. Very little is known of his biography. He arrived in England in c. 1689 and enjoyed the patronage of William III and Mary II where he was titled as England's Best Wrought-iron Designer. He was employed at St Paul's for twenty years. Not only did he work for royal destinations, but he also worked for estates and other private homes located on the countryside. He left England for the continent c. 1712. He was father-in-law to the painter of decorative schemes Louis Laguerre who married in St Martin-in-the-Fields in London. Tijou had a wife named Ann Tijou as well as a daughter. She was married in the church of St. Martin's. Both wife and daughter were buried there as well.

Little else is known of Jean Tijou or his training other than that he was a master metalworker.

== Works ==
His major commissions include gates and railings for Hampton Court Palace, where he worked between 1689 and 1700; he was paid £2,160 2s 0.25d for the wrought iron screens at the river end of the "Privy Garden" at Hampton Court. He also is known to have worked at Kensington Palace. He produced the screens and grilles of St Paul's Cathedral for Sir Christopher Wren. Tijou's work shown at St. Paul's Cathedral is different from his usual work because it does not contain the repoussé trademark he is known for. Instead it focuses on scrollwork and harmony to the building rather than setting the gate as emphasis no matter the architecture attached to it. He also worked at country houses such as Easton Neston, Burghley and Chatsworth. At Chatsworth his surviving works include the balustrade of the upper flight of the grand staircase and the set of gates known as the Golden Gates, which were moved to their present location at the north entrance to the park in the 19th century.

Tijou elevated blacksmithing to an art with his lavish Baroque sheet metal overlay on iron structures. To achieve this style of artistry, sheet metal is hammered from the rear of the plate to create form and then used to cover fire welds on foundational iron structures such as gates, hinges, fence work or wall deco pieces. Tijou used wrought iron because of the workability it provided. He was able to use charcoal wrought iron in sheets for his portion of repoussé work. The use of wrought iron allowed Tijou to work in more three dimensionality than seen before in other iron work. Many works by Tijou were gilded.

It is possible that a portrait of Jean Tijou appears at the bottom of the title page of a book entitled A New Book of Drawings Invented and Designed [sic] by John Tijou, in 1693. The plates were engraved by Michiel van der Gucht. The book or album contains 20 designs, and was the first book of ironwork designs published in England. The book had high quality of illustration which helped mark it as his own and set it apart from other books on iron work. Many other catalogues followed this book throughout the Victorian Era.

== Influence on Ironwork ==
After Jean Tijou left England in 1712, his work continued to be influential to other artists. Starting in the 18th century cast iron became more popular for its use within wrought iron assemblies. It was also used alone for structures such as railings that required less ornament and detail. The Iron work of Tijou even influences the entrance gates that are seen at Chirk Castle located near Llangollen (1719). While the original cast iron gates at St. Paul's Cathedral were not approved (removed in 1714), they provided one of the earliest examples of decorative cast iron work. These gates inspired the creativity of decoration on cast iron to be explored during the golden age. Jean Tijou's use of cast iron shows his in depth understanding for the use of materials.

== Gallery ==
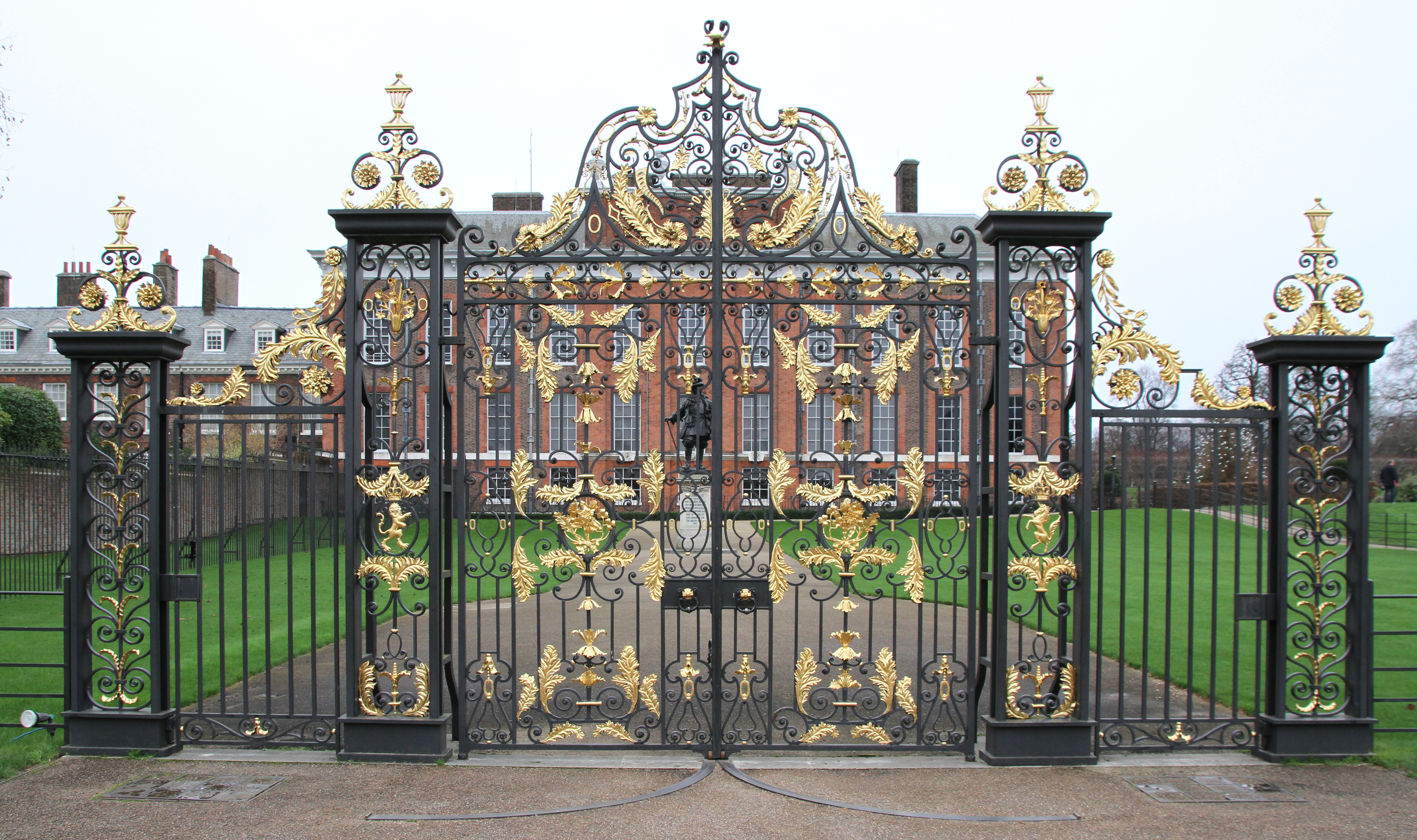
Golden Gates, Kensington Palace, late 17th century, attributed to Tijou

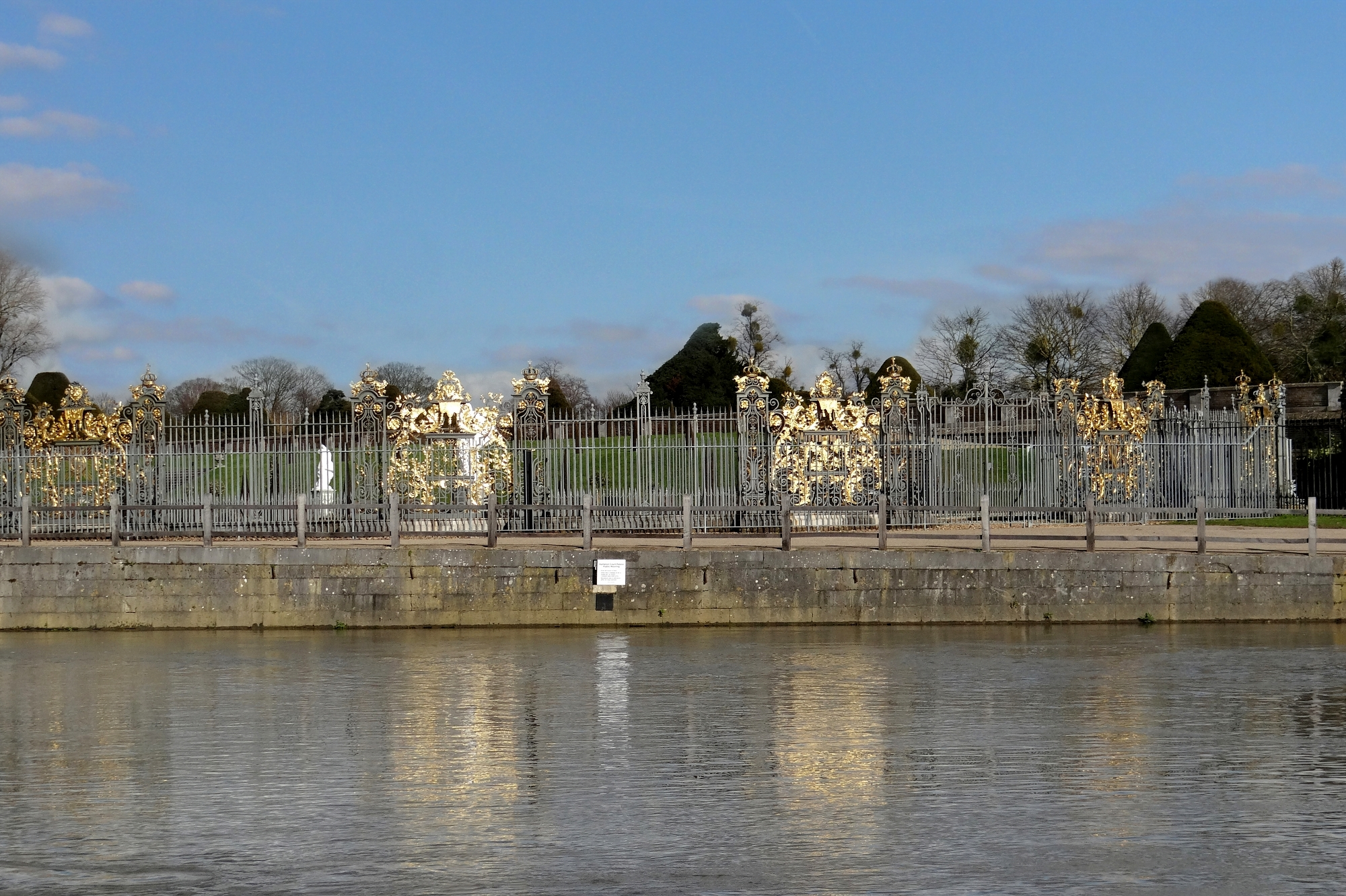
View from the outside of screens at Hampton Court Palace, c. 1700

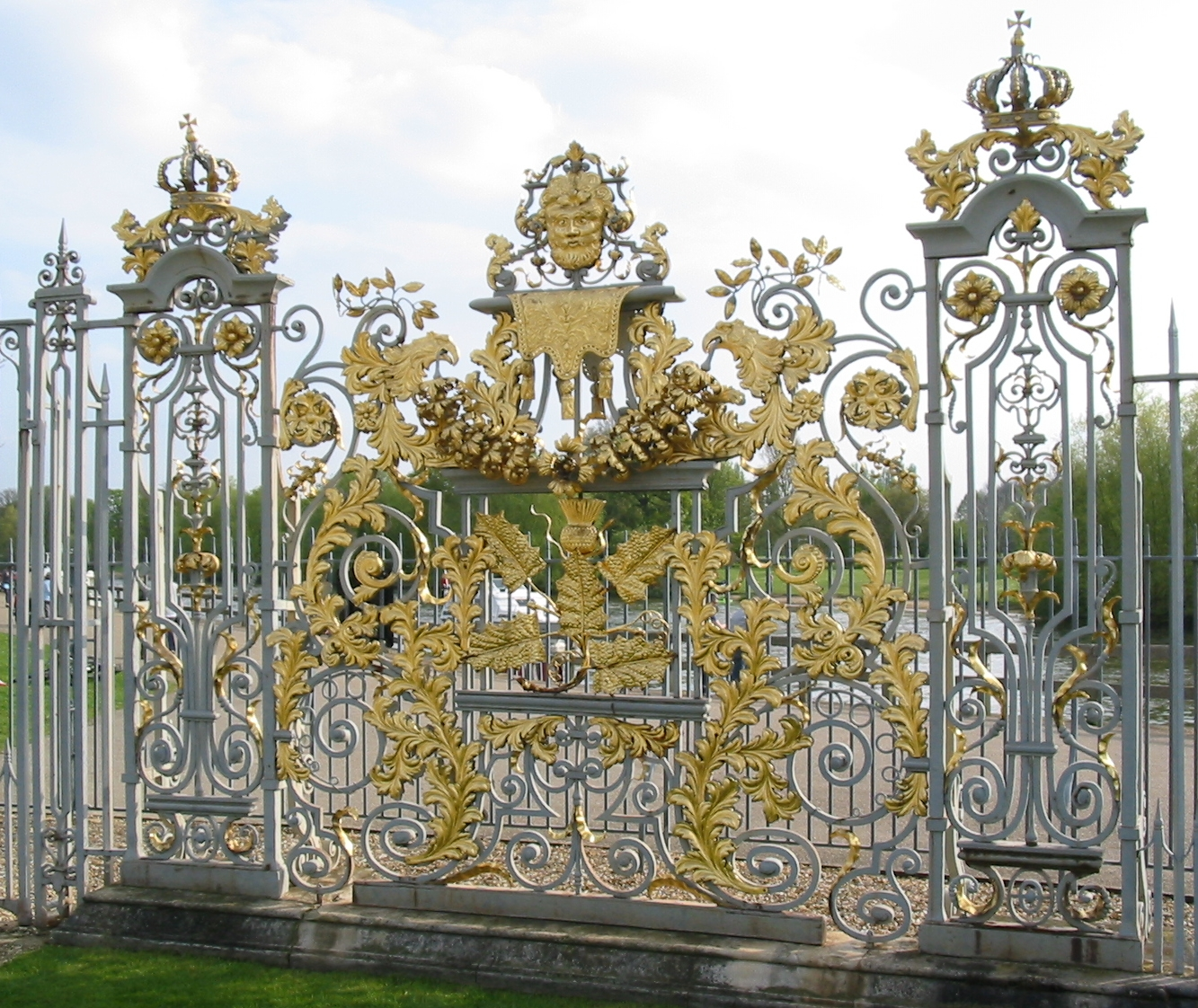
Hampton Court Palace, screen representing Scotland, c. 1700

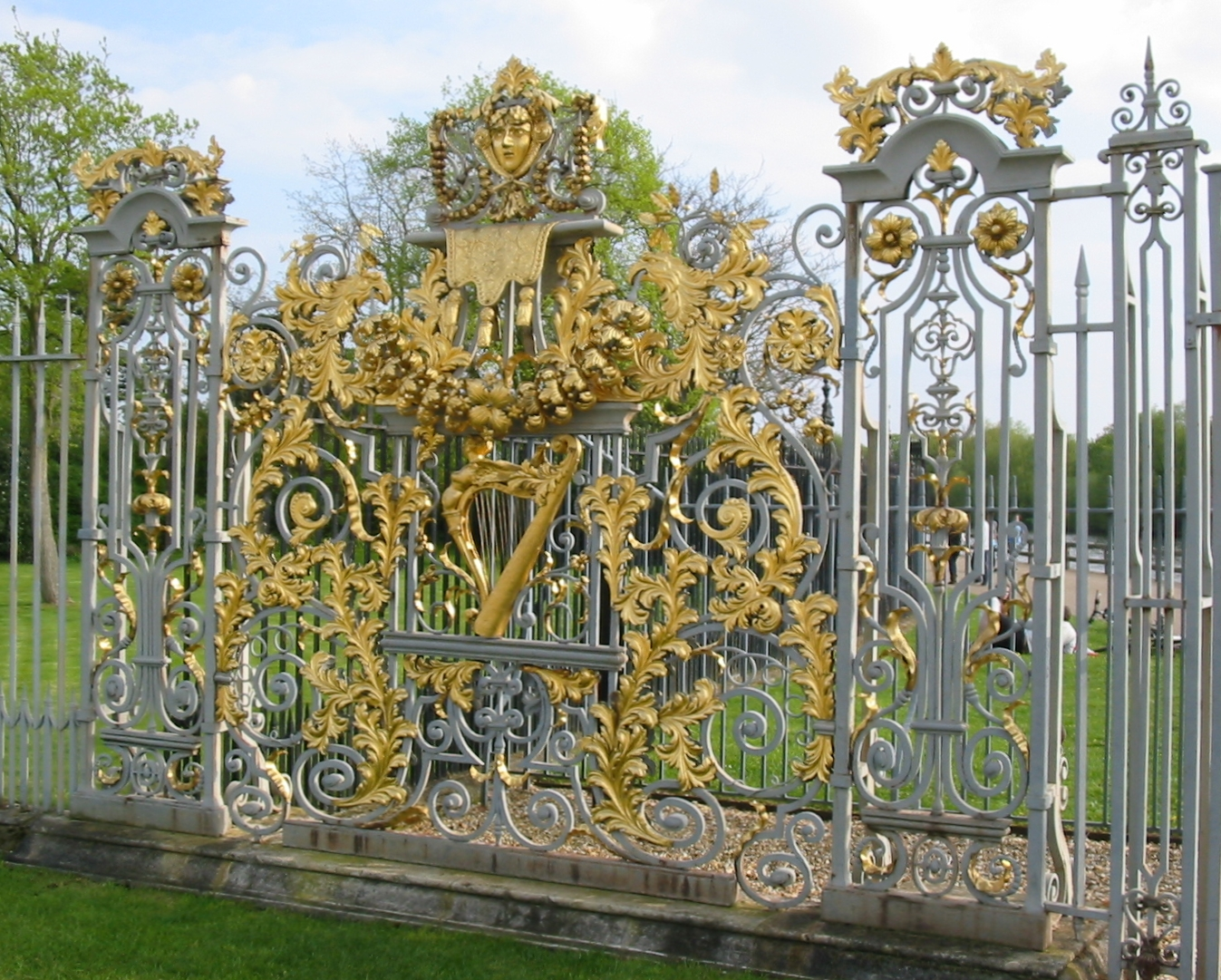
Hampton Court Palace, screen representing Ireland, c. 1700

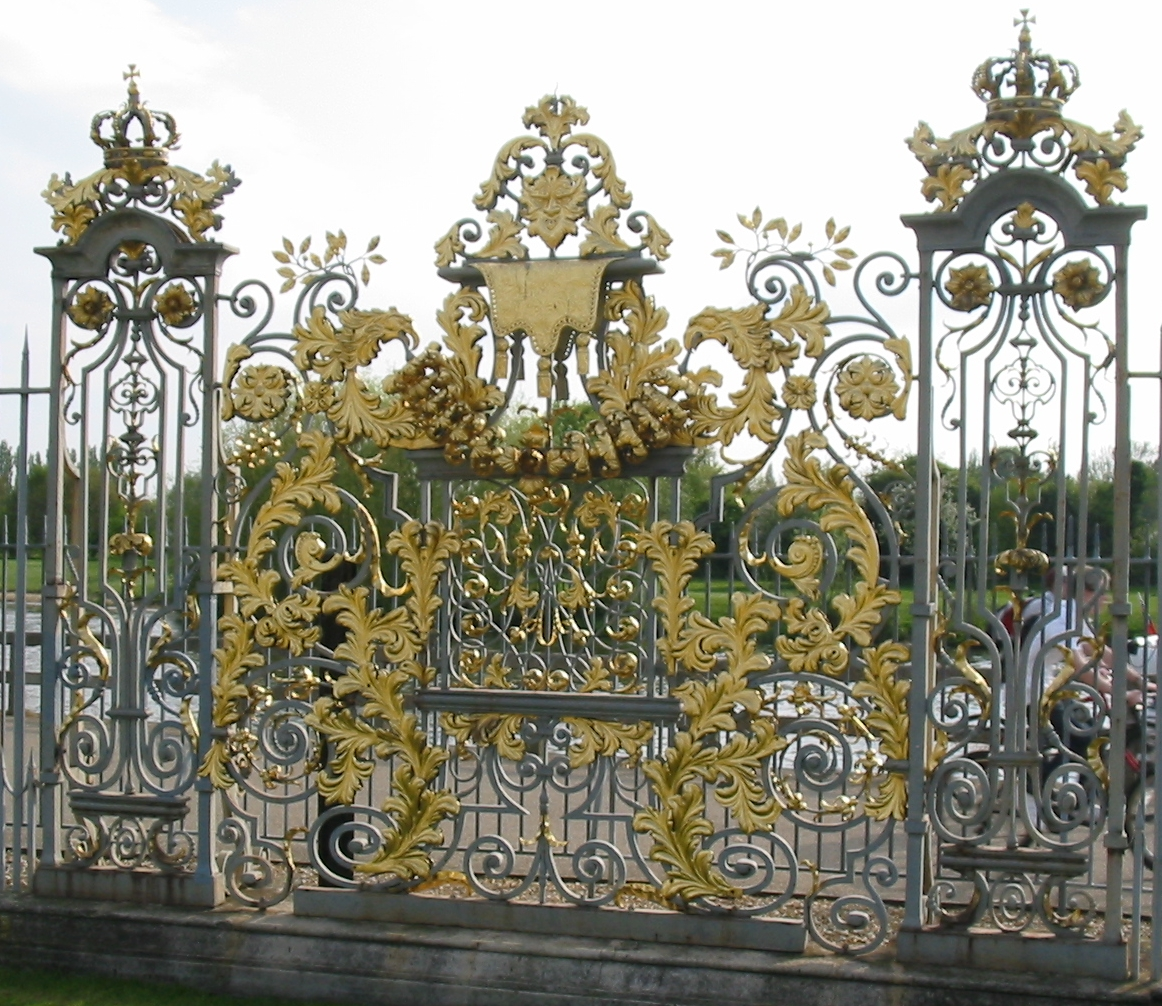
Hampton Court Palace, screen

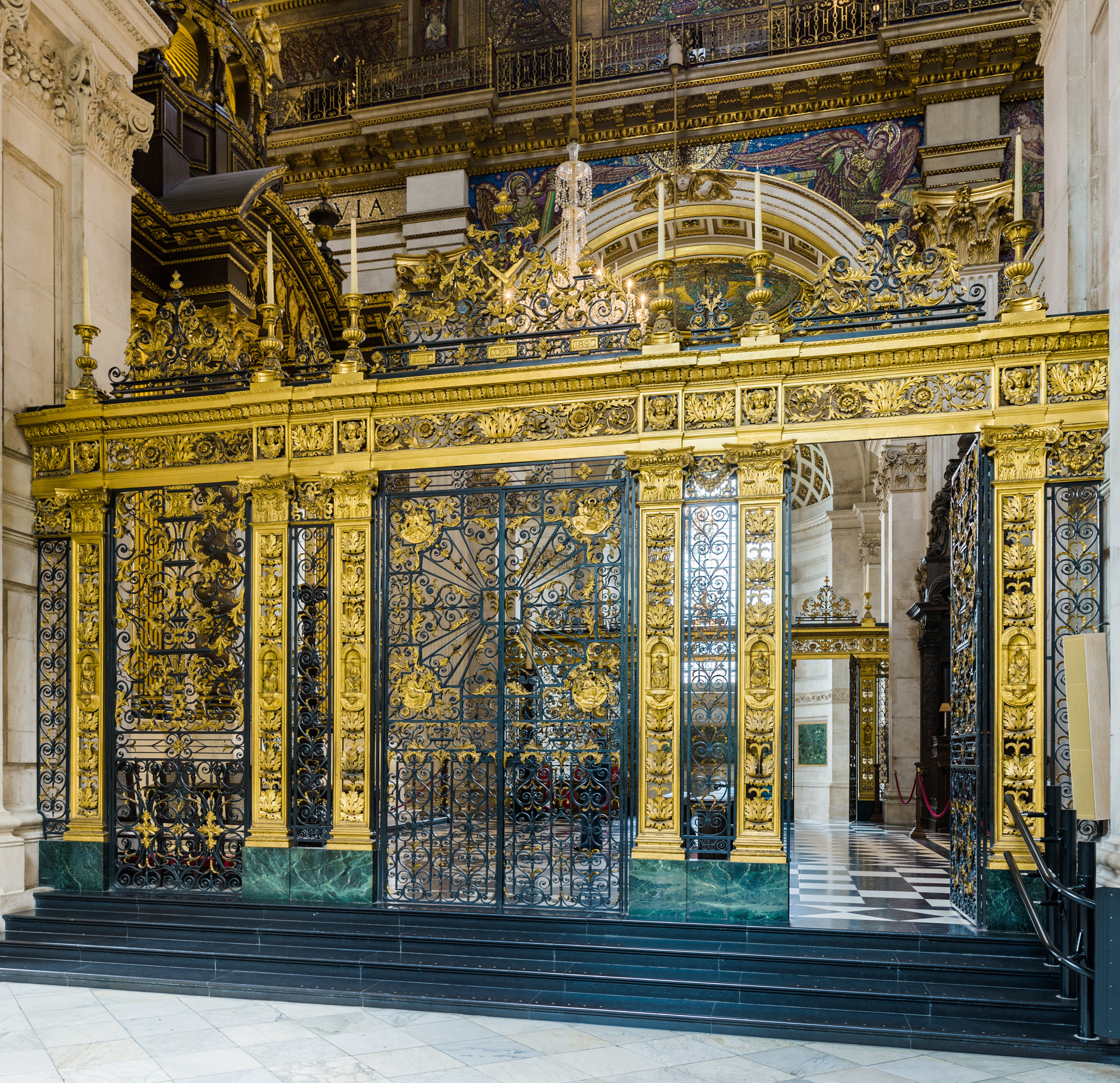
Gates in St Paul's Cathedral, London

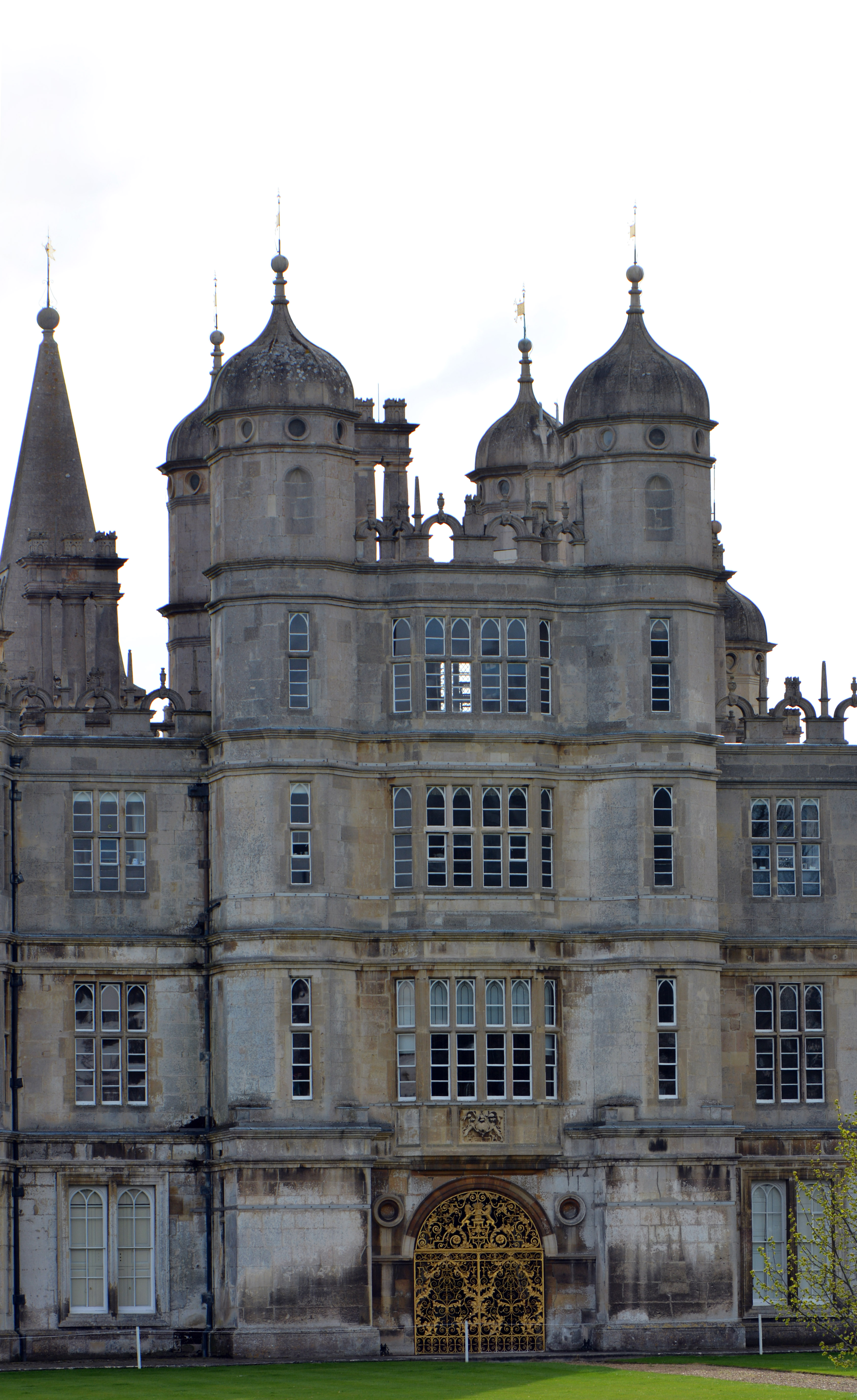
Burghley House, entrance, with Tijou's Golden Gates at the base

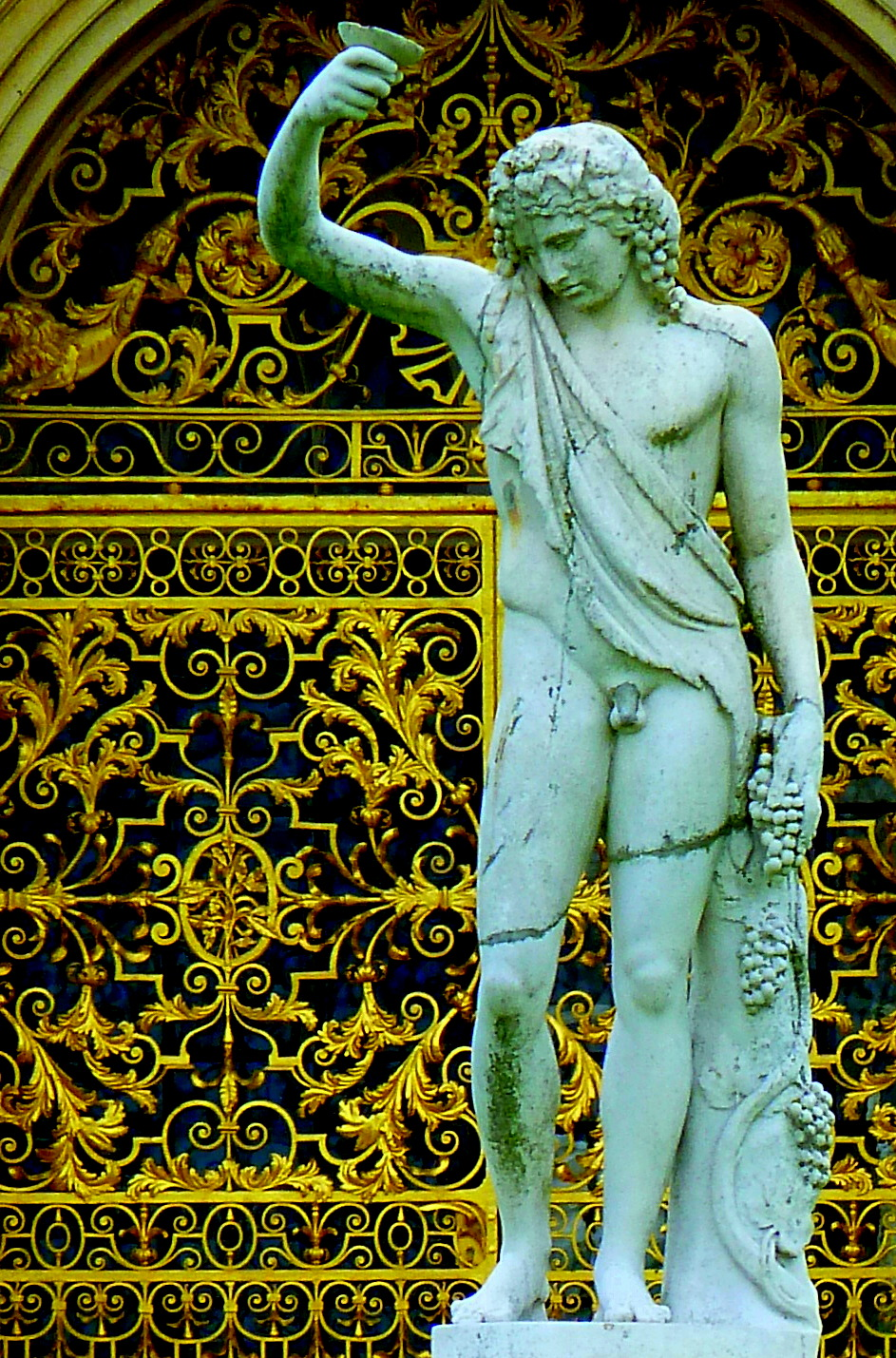
Burghley House, with Tijou's Golden Gates in background

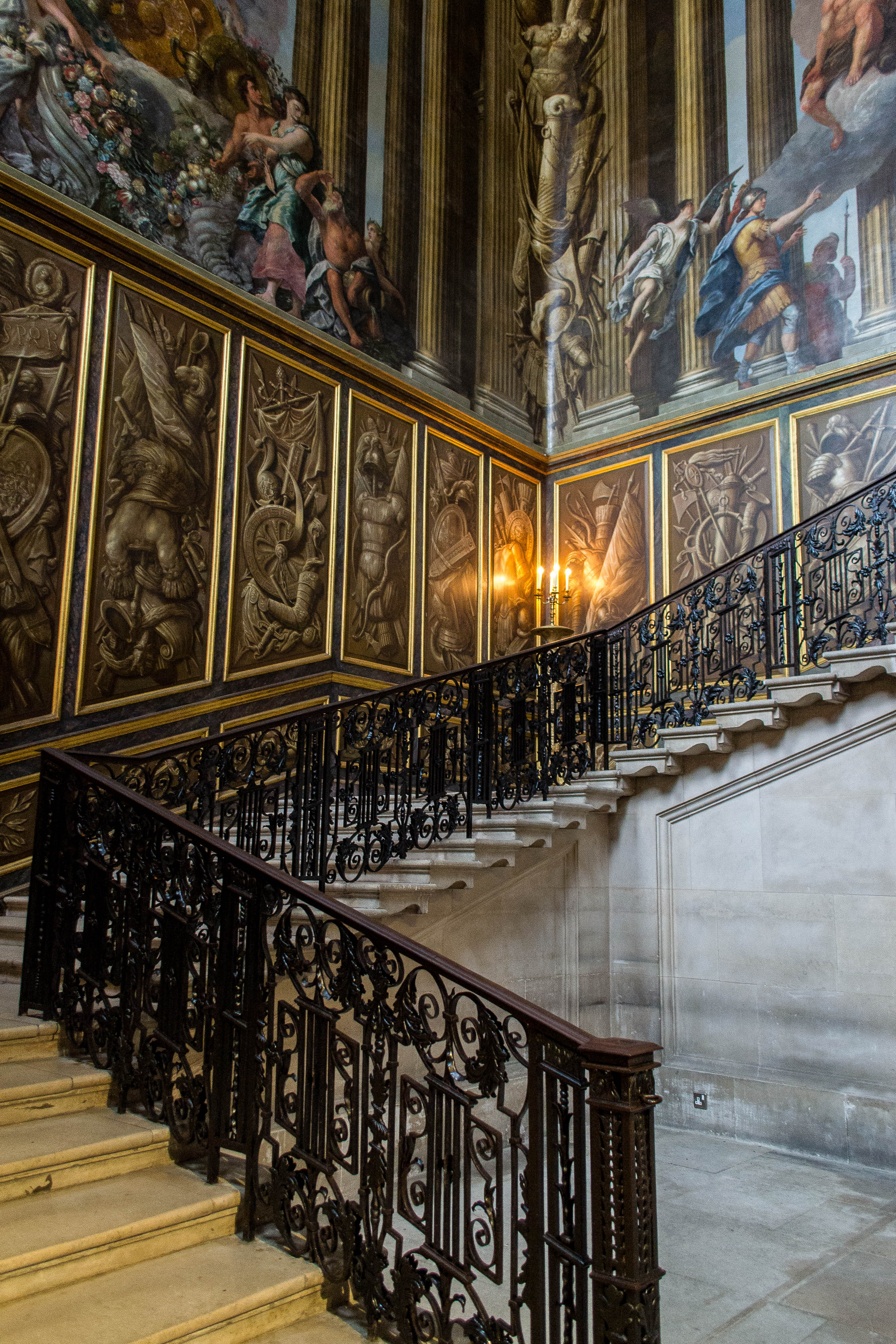
Balustrade of King's Staircase, Hampton Court Palace, c. 1695

== Bibliography ==
- Harris, John (1960). English Decorative Ironwork from Contemporary Source Books 1610–1836. London: Alec Tiranti Ltd. OCLC 30213283.
- Lister, Raymond (1957). Decorative Wrought Ironwork in Great Britain. London: Alec Tiranti Ltd. OCLC 1046341139.
