= Wrenbury-cum-Frith =

Village in Cheshire, England

Coordinates: 53.025°N 2.608°W

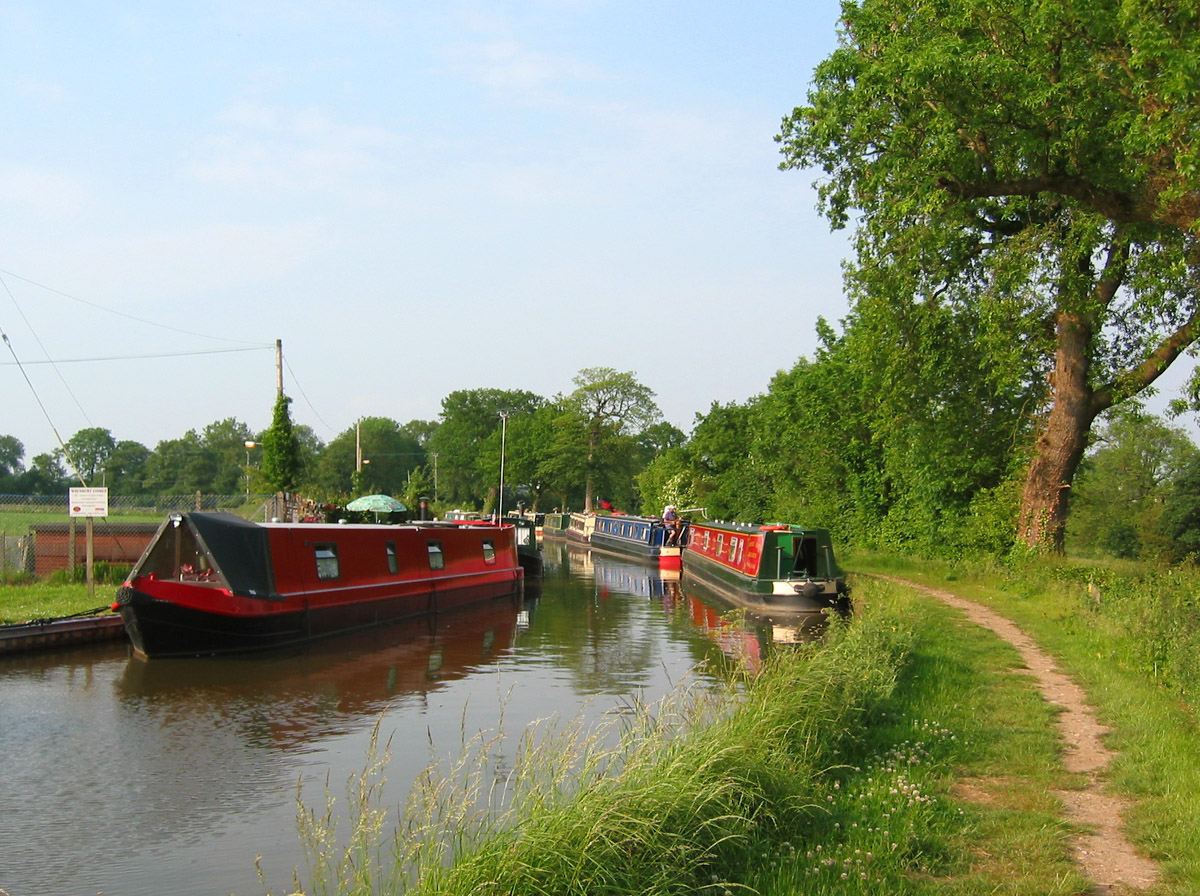
- Canal boats on the Llangollen branch of the Shropshire Union Canal

- Location within Cheshire
- Population: 1,181 (2011)
- OS grid reference: SJ597467
- Civil parish: Wrenbury cum Frith
- Unitary authority: Cheshire East
- Ceremonial county: Cheshire
- Region: North West
- Country: England
- Sovereign state: United Kingdom
- Post town: NANTWICH
- Postcode district: CW5
- Dialling code: 01270
- Police: Cheshire
- Fire: Cheshire
- Ambulance: North West
- UK Parliament: Chester South and Eddisbury

Wrenbury-cum-Frith is a village and civil parish in the unitary authority of Cheshire East, and the ceremonial county of Cheshire, England. It lies on the River Weaver, around 8.5 miles (13.7 km) south-west of Crewe.

The civil parish of Wrenbury cum Frith also covers the small settlements of Gaunton's Bank, Pinsley Green, Porter's Hill, Smeaton Wood, Wrenbury Heath and Wrenburywood. It has a total population of around 1,100, being measured at the 2011 Census as 1,181.

== History ==
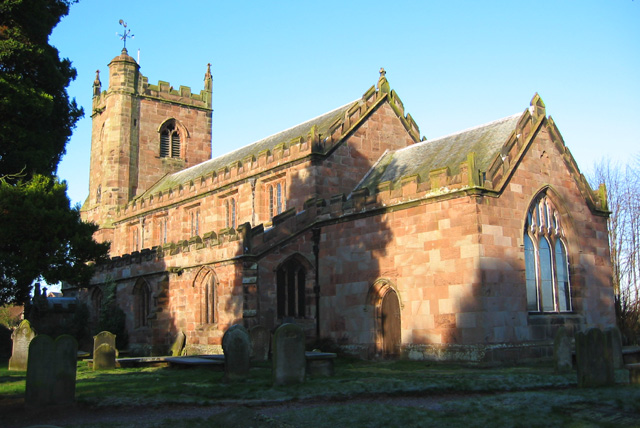
St Margaret's Church

The village is listed in the Domesday Book as Wareneberie, and became Wrennebury in 1230. The name is said to mean "old forest inhabited by wrens". Wrenbury formed part of the extensive lands of William Malbank (also William Malbedeng), who owned much of the Nantwich hundred.

As a chapel attached to St Mary's Church, Acton, Wrenbury was included in the lands donated to the Cistercian Combermere Abbey in around 1180, shortly after the abbey's 1133 foundation by Hugh Malbank, second Baron of Nantwich. In 1539, after the Dissolution, the land was granted to George Cotton, and the Cotton family remained important local landowners for centuries.

A free school by the church was endowed by Ralph Buckley in 1605.

== Governance ==
Wrenbury cum Frith is administered by Wrenbury-cum-Frith Parish Council. From 1974 the civil parish was served by Crewe and Nantwich Borough Council, which was succeeded on 1 April 2009 by the unitary authority of Cheshire East. Wrenbury cum Frith falls in the parliamentary constituency of Chester South and Eddisbury; the current Member of Parliament, elected in 2024, is Aphra Brandreth of the Conservative Party.

== Geography and transport ==
Map of Wrenbury

The civil parish has an area of 2,184 acres (884 ha). Wrenbury village lies at an elevation of around 230 feet (70 m), about 5 miles (8.0 km) south-west of Nantwich, Cheshire and 5 miles (8.0 km) north-east of Whitchurch, Shropshire. Nearby villages include Marbury, Aston and Audlem.

The village is on the Llangollen branch of the Shropshire Union Canal. It has an unmanned railway station on the Welsh Marches Railway. The Cheshire Cycleway runs through the village and the South Cheshire Way long-distance path runs just south of it.

== Demography ==
In 2006, the total population of the civil parish was estimated as 1,100. In the 2001 census, the recorded population was 1,060. The population has doubled since the beginning of the 20th century; the historical population figures were 404 in 1801, 490 in 1851, 491 in 1901 and 708 in 1951.

== Places of worship ==
The red sandstone St Margaret's Church, overlooking the village green, dates from the early 16th century. Notable features include a rare example of a dog whipper's pew and a memorial to Stapleton Cotton, 1st Viscount Combermere. A war memorial stands in the churchyard, which also contains the war graves of a soldier of the First World War and a soldier and airman of the Second World War.

== Other landmarks ==
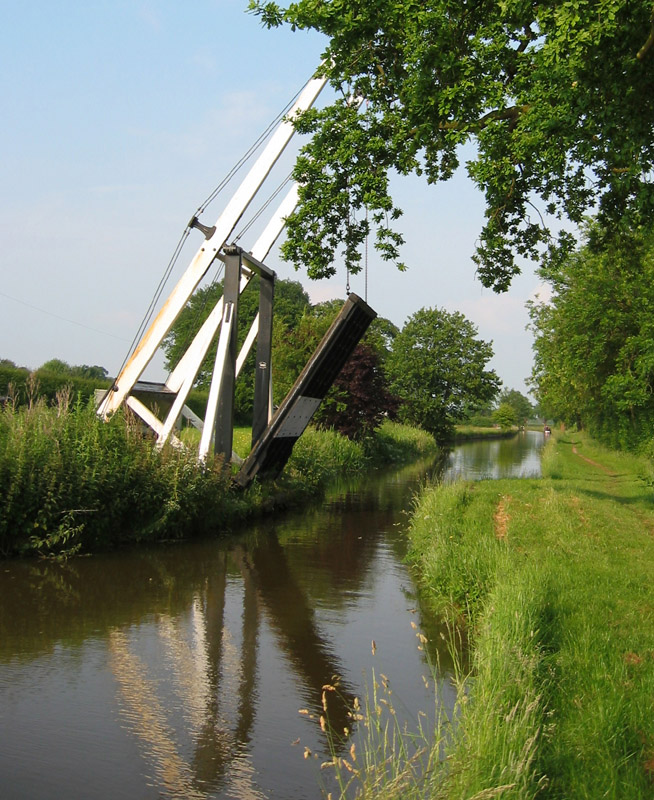
Telford canal bridge

The centre of Wrenbury village is a conservation area. Two black-and-white cottages overlook the village green; Elm House is a Grade II listed cottage with prominent brick chimneys dating from the 17th century, while Stanley House dates from 1859. In the churchyard stands a small Grade II listed black-and-white cottage with brick infill, dating from the 17th century, which is possibly a former almshouse. Hawk House, formerly the Hawk and Buckle Inn, is a Grade II listed brick cottage near the post office which dates from the early 18th century. There are also several black-and-white farmhouses and cottages within the Wrenbury cum Frith parish, some of which date from the 17th century.

Wrenbury Hall was the home of the Starkey family, prominent local landowners, until 1920; parts of the house date from the 17th century, although the front was refaced in Elizabethan style in 1916–19. It is said to have been used as shelter for the Parliamentary forces in 1643 when Nantwich was besieged before the Battle of Nantwich, during the Civil War.

In 1922 the house was re-purposed as a small sanatorium of 50 beds, mainly to cater for World War I army veterans suffering from tuberculosis. This was superseded by the larger Cheshire Joint Sanatorium, at Loggerheads, Staffordshire. However, patients from Loggerheads would be sent to retrain at Wrenbury. The site closed in 1980 and is now in private ownership, though a charity offering services for children continues to occupy a building on the site.

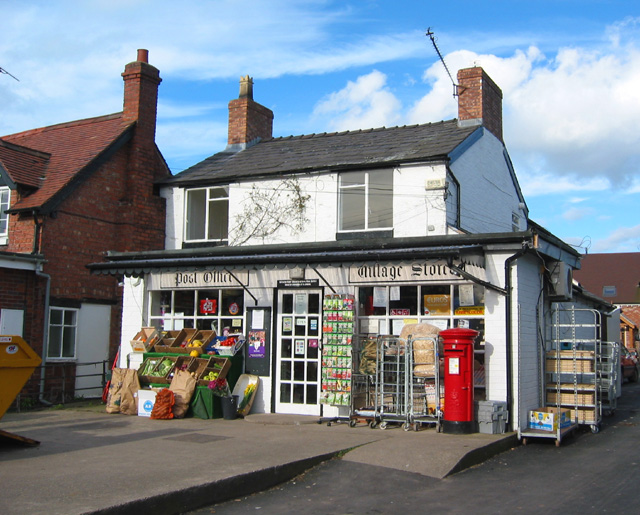
Village store and post office

The Shropshire Union Canal near the village has three rare single-span timber lift bridges dating from 1790, which are among Thomas Telford's earliest works. They are of the drawbridge type, with a wooden platform hinged at the north end which is raised and lowered by counterbalancing beam weights. Two are Grade II* listed footbridges; the Grade II listed third bridge now carries road traffic and incorporates a modern mechanical crank.

== Education ==
The Grade II listed red-brick village primary school dates from 1879 and features a bellcote and weathervane. It won the "Champion School" category of the "Your Champions" Awards 2007, sponsored by Scottish Power and Trinity Mirror.

== Culture and community ==
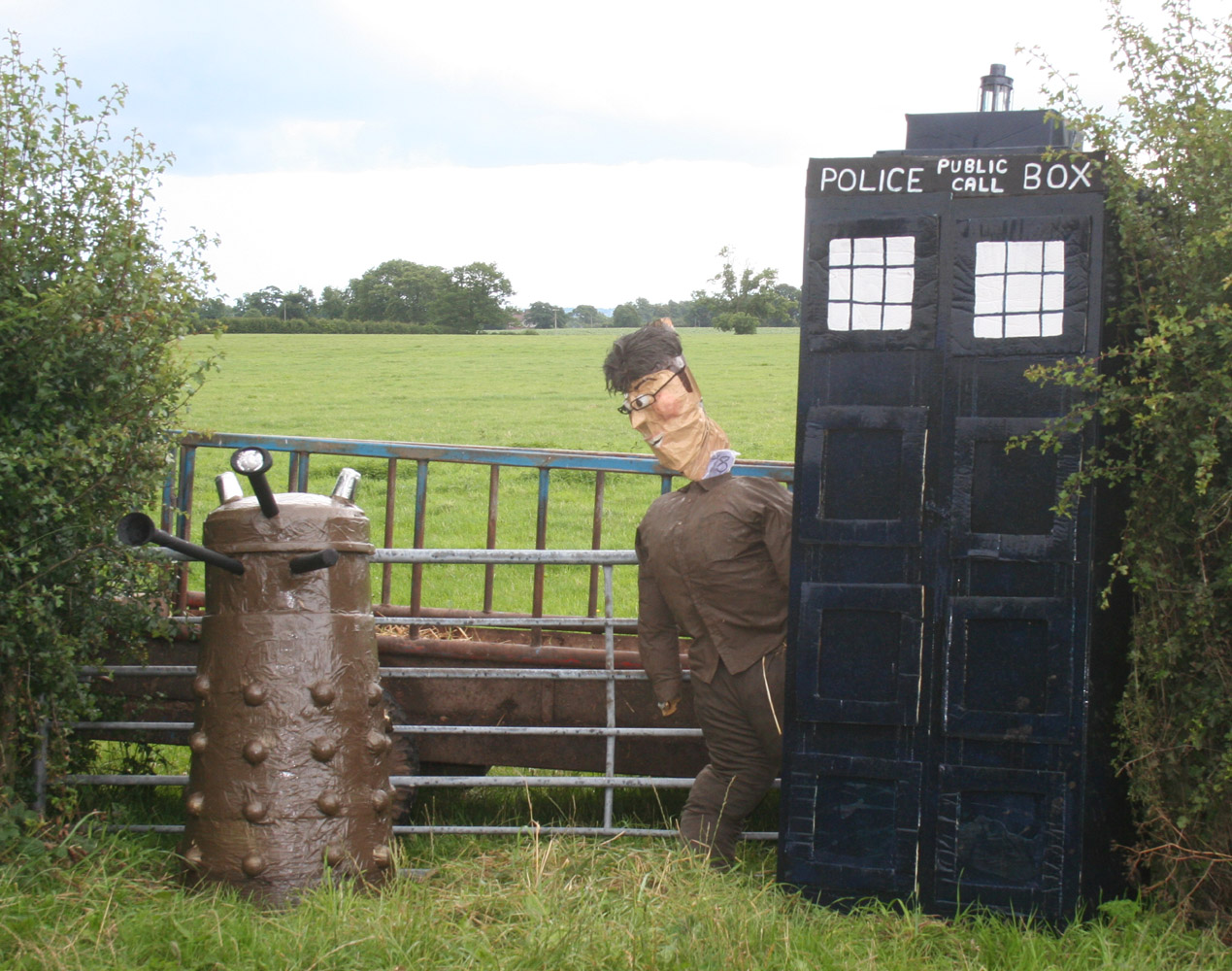
Scarecrow trail in 2007

The village has a post office and general store, and a doctor's surgery. There is one public house remaining open, the Dusty Miller, which occupies a 19th-century corn mill by the canal at Wrenbury Bridge, and is listed in The Good Pub Guide. The nearby Cotton Arms, named after the Cotton family and described by CAMRA as "a very popular pub with canal users, walkers and cyclists", closed in 2023.

Sports facilities include a pavilion, bowling green, tennis courts and football pitches, and the Wingate Centre, just outside the village, has a gymnasium. Local organisations meet at St Margaret's village hall. The mobile library service visits Wrenbury and Wrenbury Heath every three weeks. Facilities for tourists include a caravan site near the canal, and the Alvechurch Boat Centre, a boat-hire company, which operates from Wrenbury Mill, beside Wrenbury Bridge.

Wrenbury is known for its annual scarecrow trail, which started in 2000. Held the first weekend in July as part of a summer fair, around a hundred and fifty scarecrows were on display in 2006.

== Notable residents ==
Puritan preacher Julines Herring (1582–1644/45) lived in Wrenbury in 1635–37, assisting in parish work, between ministering in Shrewsbury and Amsterdam. The Very Reverend Alan Brunskill Webster (1918–2007), author, and Dean of the cathedrals of Norwich and St Paul's, was born in Wrenbury; the son of John Webster, vicar of St Margaret's Church, he lived at the vicarage until 1935. Crewe Alexandra, Stoke City and Cardiff City footballer Johnny King (1932–2025) was born in Wrenbury. Trampolinist Bryony Page (born 1990) was brought up in Wrenbury; she won a silver medal at the 2016 Summer Olympics, Britain's first Olympic medal in the discipline.

== See also ==
- Listed buildings in Wrenbury cum Frith
