= Listed buildings in Dodcott cum Wilkesley =

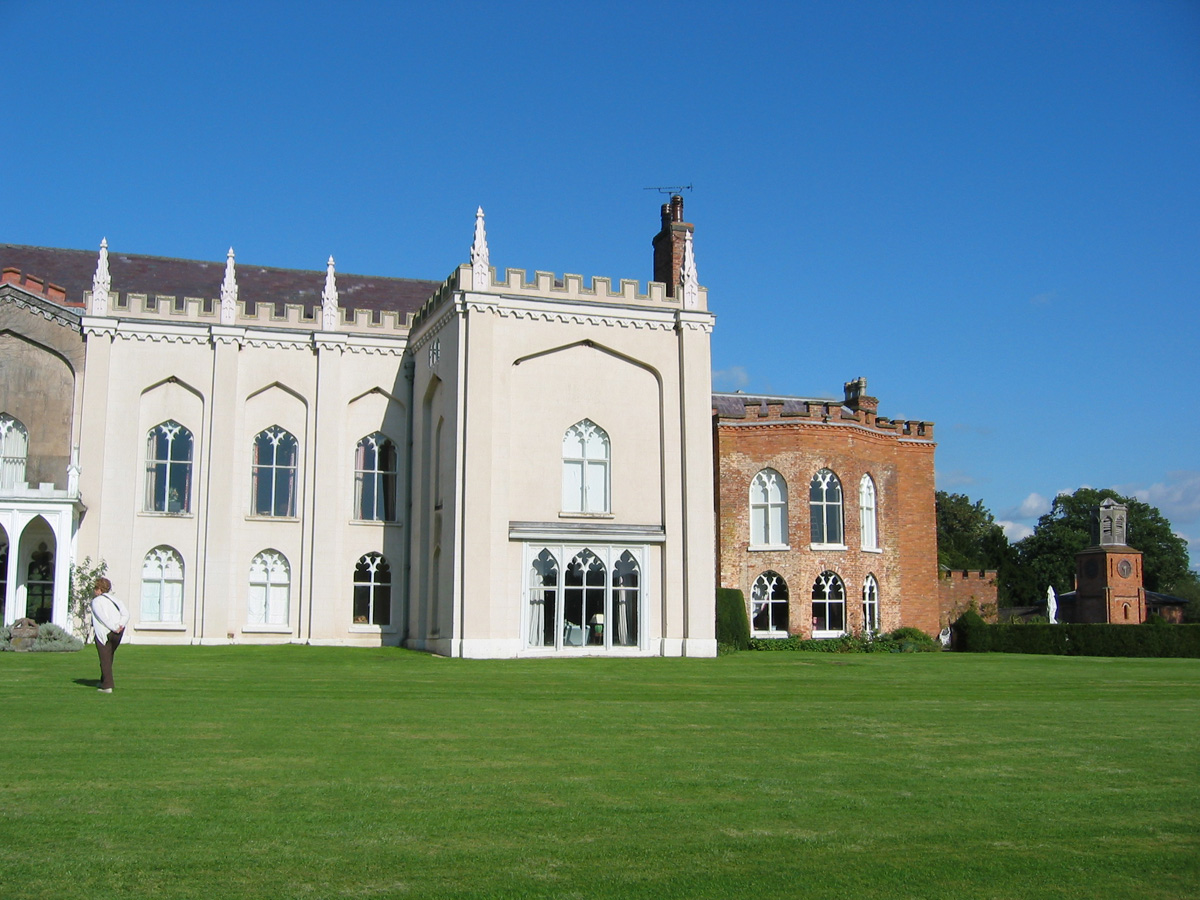
Abbot's House of Combermere Abbey, a grade-I-listed former monastery

A total of 21 buildings and other structures in the English civil parish of Dodcott cum Wilkesley have been officially designated as listed buildings for their "special architectural and historic interest". Dodcott cum Wilkesley is in the Cheshire East division of the ceremonial county of Cheshire, situated on the Cheshire Plain at the border with Shropshire. The civil parish is predominantly rural, with many scattered minor settlements, the largest of which is the small village of Burleydam. One of the listed buildings is classified by English Heritage as being in grade I, meaning "of exceptional interest, sometimes considered to be internationally important" (this grade accounts for only 2.5% of all listed buildings); two are in grade II* and the remainder in grade II.

Combermere Abbey, the remains of a former Cistercian monastery founded in 1133, is listed at grade I. Richly endowed at foundation, its lands included the manor of Wilkesley, the villages of Dodcott, Lodmore and Royal, land at Burleydam, and woods at Butterley Heyes. After its dissolution in 1538, the abbey was granted to Sir George Cotton, who converted part of the abbey buildings into a country house, demolishing the remainder. The estate remained in the Cotton family, later the Viscounts Combermere, until 1919. Little remains of the medieval monastic buildings; remnants of medieval stonework from an arch are concealed in a cupboard in the house, and a sundial in the park is believed to incorporate part of a 12th-century column. The existing house incorporates a building generally considered to represent the Abbot's House, part of whose timbers have recently been dated to around 1502. Its timber-framed structure was hidden under a Gothic remodelling of around 1814–21, in which cement render, castellations and windows with pointed arches were added. Combermere Park occupies a substantial area in the west of the civil parish and contains almost half of the parish's listed buildings and structures. The other listed buildings and structures within the park date from the 18th and 19th centuries; many also have Gothic features. Unusual structures include a grade-II*-listed game larder, an icehouse, a folly incorporating dog kennels, a battlemented water tower and a clock tower.

St Michael's Church and its gates and railings in Burleydam are also associated with the Cotton family. Three listed buildings are clustered in the small settlement of Royal's Green, two in the hamlet of Wilkesley, and others in the hamlets of Barnett Brook and Grindley Green. The five half-timbered "black and white" cottages and farm buildings to have listed status all date from the 17th century; this century accounts for half of the timber-framed buildings in Cheshire. The earliest is believed to be Butterley Heyes, an early 17th-century farmhouse which is one of the parish's grade-II*-listed buildings. The earliest brick building, Wilkesley Farmhouse, also dates from the 17th century, and brick predominates as a building material in the listed buildings dating from the 18th and 19th centuries. Several structures are built in sandstone, including Stone Lodge, an early 19th-century gate lodge to the abbey.

== Listed buildings and structures ==
Grade	Criteria
Grade I	Buildings of exceptional interest, sometimes considered to be internationally important.
Grade II*	Particularly important buildings of more than special interest.
Grade II	Buildings of national importance and special interest.

Name	Image	Grade	Built	Location, OS Grid ref. (Note: Sometimes known as OSGB36, the grid reference is based on the British national grid reference system used by the Ordnance Survey.)	Description
Combermere Abbey	photograph	I	early 16th century	Combermere Park SJ 58726 44130	Combermere Abbey incorporates the remains of a Cistercian monastery, founded in 1133. The monastic core is believed to represent the Abbot's House, a timber-framed building with a hammerbeam roof whose timbers have been dated to 1502; the building is thought to have been remodelled not long before the abbey's dissolution in 1538. It became the country house of the Cotton family, who redesigned it in 1563. The building was remodelled and extended in the 1790s, and further extended and Gothicised in around 1814–21, with the addition of cement render, castellations and windows with pointed arches. Parts of the later additions were removed or reduced in the 1970s.
Butterley Heyes	photograph	II*	early 17th century	Butterley Heys SJ 64794 41951	This farmhouse originally had an H-shaped plan with later extensions; its two projecting wings have gables. There are two storeys with attics under a tiled roof, with a prominent brick chimneystack to the right-hand end. The timber frame has been infilled with brick; it features small framing with angle braces.
Game larder to the centre of the service court at Combermere Abbey	photograph	II*	early 19th century	Combermere Park SJ 58771 44087	This octagonal red-brick game larder, probably by the Irish Morrison family, stands on a stone plinth, with a porch to the east face. The shallow-pitched slate roof has large overhangs, and is topped with an octagonal wooden lantern, also slate roofed. The faces each have a two-light window headed with a cusp-shaped arch. The original ironwork on which game was hung remains in the interior.
Barnett Brook Bridge	—	II	early–mid-19th century	Barnett Brook SJ 62070 44144	This single-span road bridge carries Sheppenhall Lane over a tributary of the River Weaver. It is in red sandstone with a rounded arch and a projecting stone band which delineates the parapet from the arch.
Brankelow Cottage	—	II	c. 1797	Combermere Park SJ 58143 44230	Now a folly, Brankelow Cottage was built as a model dairy by John Webb, and was used as a gamekeeper's cottage. Standing to the west of Comber Mere, the building is in red brick with stone dressings under a slate roof, to a cross-shaped plan; the main (lake-facing) front has seven symmetrical bays, a central three-bay projection and pavilions to each end, formerly used as kennels. It is ornamented with battlements, pinnacles, pilasters and arrowslits. The interior has a single elliptical room.
Church of St Michael	photograph	II	1769	Burleydam SJ 60685 42575	Now a parish church, St Michael's was built for Sir Lynch Cotton as a private chapel to Combermere Abbey, and extended at the east end in 1886. The church is in red brick with stone dressings under a slate roof. The windows have round arches. The three-bay west front, flanked by piers topped with fluted stone cylinders, has a clock with a carved stone surround in the gable. The northern porch has a carving depicting St George and the dragon.
Gate piers and railings circa 5 yards to the north east of Stone Lodge	photograph	II	c. 1829	Combermere Park/Whitchurch Rd SJ 59909 43429	The gates and railings to the south-east entrance to Combermere Park stand adjacent to Stone Lodge and are also by the Irish Morrison family. The four gate piers are of yellow sandstone; the two central are taller and bear carved shields. At the date of listing (1986), the two central piers were surmounted with stone eagles, no longer present. The wrought-iron railings are set on a low sandstone wall.
Grindley Green Cottage	—	II	17th century	Grindley Green SJ 60743 43457	This former farmhouse has a timber frame with small framing, infilled in places with brick; at the date of listing (1979), some wattle and daub remained on the upper storey. There are brick chimneystacks to each side.
Icehouse circa 100 yards from the stable block at Combermere Abbey	—	II	18th or 19th century	Combermere Park SJ 58942 44396	This red-brick icehouse consists of a barrel-vaulted passage leading to a chamber with a domed roof. It was in ruins in 1997.
Lodmore Lane Cottages	—	II	17th century	Fields View SJ 61562 42152	Formerly a pair of cottages, Lodmore Lane Cottages is now a single two-storey dwelling, restored and extended in the 20th century. The timber frame features small framing with brick infill.
Northern range of service buildings	photograph	II	18th or early 19th century	Combermere Park SJ 58768 44098	With the southern range, this forms a service court to the south-east of Combermere Abbey. Constructed in red brick with a slate roof, the building features lancet windows, cross-shaped arrowslits and a parapet with battlements. The range includes an octagonal turret and a water tower, both with battlements.
Northwoods Farmhouse	—	II	early–mid-18th century	Wilkesley SJ 64592 40194	Northwoods Farmhouse is in red brick with three storeys and three bays under a tiled roof. The main entrance is placed asymmetrically, and has a 19th-century porch. Several of the ground- and first-floor windows have slightly arched heads.
Outbuildings circa 10 yards to north of The Royals	—	II	17th century	Royal's Green SJ 62289 42694	This L-shaped farm outbuilding has a timber frame, infilled with brick, featuring small framing with passing braces, under a partly tiled roof. One wing has two storeys; the other is single storey.
Railings, piers and gates at Church of St Michael	—	II	early 18th century	Burleydam SJ 60698 42589	The cast-iron double gates and railings to St Michael's churchyard were moved from Lleweni Hall, Denbighshire. The gate piers are square in cross-section and are formed of open ironwork tracery. The railings are topped with arrowheads.
The Royals	—	II	17th century	Royal's Green SJ 62275 42676	The Royals is a T-shaped building with two storeys under a slate roof. It was formerly a hunting lodge. The timber frame features small framing with angle braces and rendered infill. The frame of the main part of the house has been heightened, while that of the rear wing remains at the original height. The front entrance is placed asymmetrically, and has a 19th-century porch.
The Royals Farmhouse	—	II	late 18th or early 19th century	Royal's Green SJ 62301 42645	This red-brick farmhouse has three storeys and three bays to the main façade, under a tiled roof. The central entrance has a brick porch and the windows have stone sills. The left-hand face also has three narrow bays. The two prominent brick chimneystacks are placed symmetrically to each side.
Southern range of service buildings	photograph	II	18th or early 19th century	Combermere Park SJ 58777 44077	With the northern range, this forms a service court to the south-east of Combermere Abbey. It is constructed in red brick with a slate roof. The range includes a square clock tower, built in 1815 to celebrate the Battle of Waterloo; the clock is by JB Joyce & Co and has a circular clock face. The tower is decorated with arrowslits and capped by an octagonal timber bell cote whose openings have pointed arches.
Stable block	photograph	II	1837	Combermere Park SJ 58990 44236	Designed by Edward Blore, the former stable block to Combermere Abbey, now divided into holiday cottages, forms a quadrangle surrounding a rectangular courtyard and incorporates two cottages and a former carriage house. The Elizabethan-style structure is in red brick with stone dressings under a slate roof, and features lancet windows, square lead-roofed turrets and an octagonal-flued chimneystack. The arched main entrance is placed asymmetrically in the front range; it is flanked by narrow octagonal turrets topped with spirelets.
Stone Lodge	—	II	c. 1828–29	Combermere Park/Whitchurch Rd SJ 59897 43422	Stone Lodge, the gate lodge to the south-east entrance to Combermere Park, is by William Vitruvius Morrison. The Elizabethan-style lodge is in red sandstone under a slate roof, and has a prominent chimneystack. The main (driveway) face has two storeys with a canted bay window and a gable, which displays Viscount Combermere's coat of arms in lead, and is surmounted by an elongated finial. To its left, slightly recessed, is a single-storey wing with a projecting gabled porch also bearing a coat of arms.
Sundial and base circa 5 yards to south east of Combermere Abbey	—	II	12th-century base; 19th-century sundial	Combermere Park SJ 58761 44131	The sundial is of yellow sandstone with a copper dial face and gnomon. The circular base is believed to be the remains of a Romanesque column from the 12th-century Combermere Abbey building. The shaft is octagonal.
Wilkesley Farmhouse	—	II	17th century	Wilkesley SJ 62936 41014	Wilkesley Farmhouse is a large two-storey building in red brick under a tiled roof. The earliest bay features blue-brick diaperwork. The farmhouse was substantially extended during the 19th century, with the addition of a T-shaped projecting wing.

== See also ==
- Listed buildings in Audlem
- Listed buildings in Newhall
- Listed buildings in Wrenbury cum Frith
- Listed buildings in Marbury cum Quoisley
- Listed buildings in Whitchurch Urban, Shropshire
- Listed buildings in Whitchurch Rural, Shropshire
- Listed buildings in Ightfield, Shropshire
- Listed buildings in Adderley, Shropshire

== Notes and references ==
=== Sources ===
- de Figueiredo P, Treuherz J. Cheshire Country Houses (Phillimore; 1988) (ISBN 0-85033-655-4)
- Driver JT. Cheshire in the Later Middle Ages. A History of Cheshire, Vol. 6 (Series Editor: JJ Bagley), (Cheshire Community Council; 1971)
- Hartwell C, Hyde M, Hubbard E, Pevsner N. The Buildings of England: Cheshire (2nd edn) (Yale University Press; 2011) (ISBN 978 0 300 17043 6)
- Husain BMC. Cheshire under the Norman Earls: 1066–1237. A History of Cheshire, Vol. 4 (Series Editor: JJ Bagley) (Cheshire Community Council; 1973)
- Local History Group, Latham FA (ed.). Wrenbury and Marbury (The Local History Group; 1999) (ISBN 0 9522284 5 9)
- McKenna L. Timber Framed Buildings in Cheshire (Cheshire County Council; 1994) (ISBN 0-906765-16-1)
