= Burleydam =

Village in Cheshire, England

Coordinates: 52.9797°N 2.5889°W

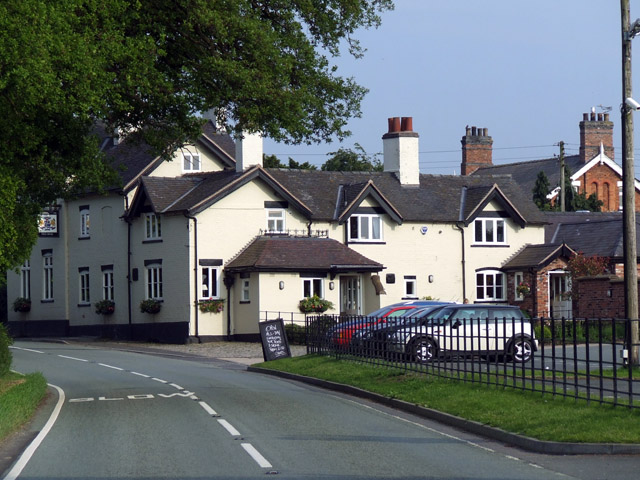
- Combermere Arms on the A525

- Location within Cheshire
- OS grid reference: SJ605426
- Civil parish: Dodcott cum Wilkesley
- Unitary authority: Cheshire East
- Ceremonial county: Cheshire
- Region: North West
- Country: England
- Sovereign state: United Kingdom
- Post town: WHITCHURCH
- Postcode district: SY13
- Dialling code: 01948
- UK Parliament: Chester South and Eddisbury

Burleydam is a small English village in the civil parish of Dodcott cum Wilkesley in the unitary authority of Cheshire East and the ceremonial county of Cheshire, near the border with Shropshire. It is on the A525. The nearest town is Whitchurch in Shropshire, around 8 km (5 miles) to the west; nearby small settlements include Barnett Brook, Grindley Green and Royal's Green in Dodcott cum Wilkesley; Dodd's Green and Newhall in Newhall civil parish; and Old Woodhouses and New Woodhouses in Shropshire.

The land was granted to Combermere Abbey, a Cistercian monastery, at its foundation in 1133. The village lies at the south-east edge of Combermere Park, around 750 m to the south east of the main (Stone Lodge) entrance. It benefited from the patronage of the Cotton family, later the Viscounts Combermere, who gained the abbey and its estates after its dissolution.

== History ==
The village is historically sometimes spelled Burladame, Burledam and Burley Dam. Land at Burleydam was part of the lands granted to the Cistercian monastery of Combermere Abbey at its foundation in 1133. After its dissolution in 1538, the abbey's estate was given to Sir George Cotton; the family, later the Viscounts Combermere, remained major land owners in the area until the 20th century. They took the Royalist side in the Civil War, and Royalist troops under Lord Capell were quartered in Burleydam in 1643.

The Combermere Arms dates from the mid-16th century, or earlier according to tradition; landlords are recorded from 1850. The existing building is claimed to date in part from the late 17th and early 18th centuries. By 1820, the road through the village was the toll road to Whitchurch in Shropshire (now the A530/A525), and the Combermere Arms became a popular coaching inn. In the 19th century, Burleydam Races occurred annually for three days, with a Race Ball being held at the Combermere Arms.

Burleydam is recorded as an ecclesiastical parish in Daniel King's Vale Royal of 1656. A chapel at Burleydam, noted by Francis Gastrell in around 1720, was built after the dissolution by the Cotton family; it is said to have been unconsecrated, but had a curate and served the abbey and tenants. The present St Mary's and St Michael's Church was built by Sir Lynch Cotton in 1769, as a private chapel to the abbey. Samuel Johnson attended a service on 24 July 1774 while staying at the abbey. It became an Anglican parish church in 1869; the first incumbent, Revd Thomas Meredyth, had previously been the abbey's chaplain. Burials started in the churchyard the same year, with Lady Susan, wife of Wellington Stapleton-Cotton, Viscount Combermere, being the earliest burial. The church was extended in 1886.

The population of Burleydam in 1779 was assessed as approximately 15 people. The village had a school from around 1850 until 1974. In 1866, it was located behind the vicarage. A purpose-built school opened on 21 October 1872, on land donated by Viscount Combermere, and was extended in 1900 and 1913. The first head-teacher of the new school was Edward Storer and Joseph A. Warner held the post from 1893 to 1924. Both Lady Combermere and Lady Crossley (wife of Sir Kenneth Crossley, who purchased Combermere Abbey in 1919) were active in support. Pupil numbers increased from 21 in 1866, to 43 in 1872, with a peak of 144 in the 20th century, declining to 15 in 1974, when the school was closed.

Burleydam had a post office, mentioned in a gazetteer of 1870–72, which also served as a village shop. By 1908 it was located opposite the Combermere Arms. In the 1920s it was run by Mrs Whittle and later by Mr T. Lea. The doctor from nearby Wrenbury held twice-weekly surgeries in its back room. The building opposite the Combermere Arms was demolished in around 1960, and both post office and shop closed in the early 1970s.

== Geography and economy ==
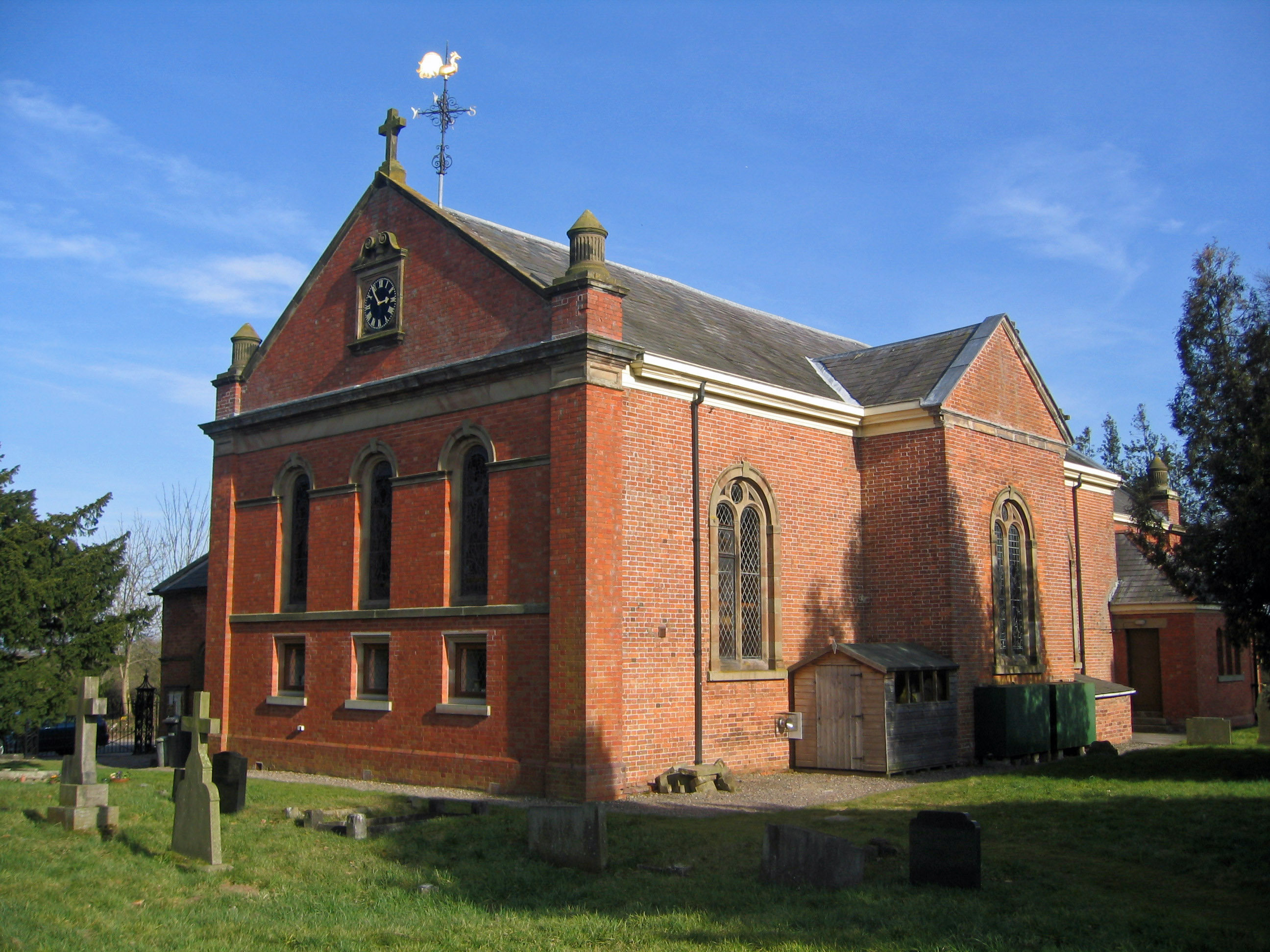
St Mary's and St Michael's Church

Burleydam is a small scattered settlement centred at SJ 605 426, which stretches along the A525 (Whitchurch Road) at the junction with Dodd's Green Lane. The village is at an elevation of around 75 m. Two brooks, the Burley and the Walkmill, run through the village; one is crossed by Burleydam Bridge. The brooks join Barnett Brook, a tributary of the River Weaver. The narrow strip of woodland of Walkmill Covert lies immediately to the north east of the village.

Local businesses include Burleydam Nurseries in the village centre, which specialises in chrysanthemums. In 1990, dairy farming was a major employer; there are several farms near the village including Blue Bache Farm, Burleydam Farm, Goldsmith House Farm, Lower Farm and Rookery Farm.

== Landmarks ==
The Combermere Arms is a traditional public house on the junction with Dodd's Green Lane, with oak beams and "beautiful panelling" on the interior. It is recommended by The Good Pub Guide. It is supposed to be haunted by a poltergeist-like spirit, which two clergymen tricked into entering a bottle which they then buried beneath the steps of the main entrance. In one version of this story, the ghost is a murdered monk.

The red-brick St Mary's and St Michael's Church dates from 1769 and is listed at grade II. The cast-iron churchyard gates and railings, also listed, come from Lleweni Hall in Wales, which the Cotton family had acquired by marriage. They are older than the church, dating from the early 18th century. The gate piers are composed of open ironwork tracery. Johnson noted both the church and its gates and railings on his 1774 visit; he described the latter as being "of great elegance." The interior of the church has "beautiful" stained glass windows dating from the early 20th century, including an "exquisite" children's window donated by Lady Crossley. There is also a bust commemorating Stapleton Cotton, 1st Viscount Combermere.

== Notable people ==
- Chloe Hewitt, ballroom dancer (Strictly Come Dancing)

== See also ==
- Listed buildings in Dodcott cum Wilkesley
