= Brankelow Cottage =

Folly cottage with ornate architectural features

Coordinates: 52.9937°N 2.6250°W

Brankelow Cottage, also known as Brankelow Folly and Brankelow House, is a folly on the Combermere Abbey estate in Cheshire, England. It is listed at grade II. Dating from 1797, it was originally a model dairy and later a gamekeeper's cottage with attached kennels. Described by Nikolaus Pevsner and co-authors as a "charming eye-catcher", the folly is ornamented with battlements, pinnacles, pilasters, arrowslits, and fancy brickwork.

== Etymology ==
The cottage takes its name from a settlement whose name is first attested in around 1130 (as copied in a manuscript of 1479), as Bronkelawa. Other early spellings are Brankelow (1133, in an eighteenth-century copy), Bronchelau (twelfth-century), and Branchehillaue (1540). The name also once appeared in a folk-etymologised doublet form Branch of Wood (attested in 1831). The name has been though to have originated as the Common Brittonic words corresponding to modern Welsh bronn ("breast, hill") and coed ("wood"). Thus it once meant "hill of the wood". To this name was then added the Old English word hlǣw ("hill, mound"), by English-speakers who no longer understood the Brittonic name. However, the place-name scholars Richard Coates and Andrew Breeze characterise this interpretation of the first parts of Brankelow as "very uncertain".

== History ==
Brankelow Cottage was built in 1797 for Sir Robert Salusbury Cotton (c. 1739–1809). The architect is believed to be John Webb (1754–1828), who was also been suggested to have been the landscape designer used when Cotton landscaped Combermere Park in 1795–97. It was originally a model dairy. The building also contained a sitting room used in summer, whose decorations were done by the Cotton family's daughters. It was subsequently used as a gamekeeper's cottage; the pavilions to each end were formerly used as dog kennels. Now, it is a folly.

== Location ==
Brankelow Cottage stands at SJ581442 on the west side of Comber Mere, on the rise approximately 300 metres southeast of the low-lying area of Brankelow Moss, within Combermere Park. It is around 500 metres across the lake from the former abbey, which lies east, and 500 metres from the memorial obelisk to Stapleton Cotton, Viscount Combermere. Combermere Park is privately owned, and there is no public access.

== Description ==
The building is in red brick with ashlar dressings under a slate roof. It is cross-shaped in plan, with both single- and two-storey portions. The main (lake-facing) front has a single storey with seven symmetrical bays, a central three-bay projection to the front, and pavilions to each end. The bays of the main face are separated by pilasters topped with stone finials, and a parapet with battlements surmounts the face; there are pinnacles at the corners. The windows to the main face have pointed arches with Tudor-style hood moulds over them, and the pavilions have arrowslits and heart-shaped ornaments. Another central three-bay projection stands to the rear, which has two storeys. To each side of the rear projection are extensions dating from the 20th century, with a circular quadrant plan. The building is further ornamented with fancy brickwork. The interior has a single elliptical room.

Nikolaus Pevsner and co-authors describe the building as a "charming eyecatcher". Historic England describes it as "the main eyecatcher at Combermere".

== See also ==
- Listed buildings in Dodcott cum Wilkesley
