= Game store =

Game store may refer to:

- A place where recreational games are stored
- Game larder: a building where game carcasses are stored
- A video game retailer
- A hobby shop
- Game, a South African store which is a subsidiary of Massmart
- Game (British retailer), a major British video game retailer

== See also ==
- Club (organization)
