= Sir Lynch Cotton, 4th Baronet =

British politician

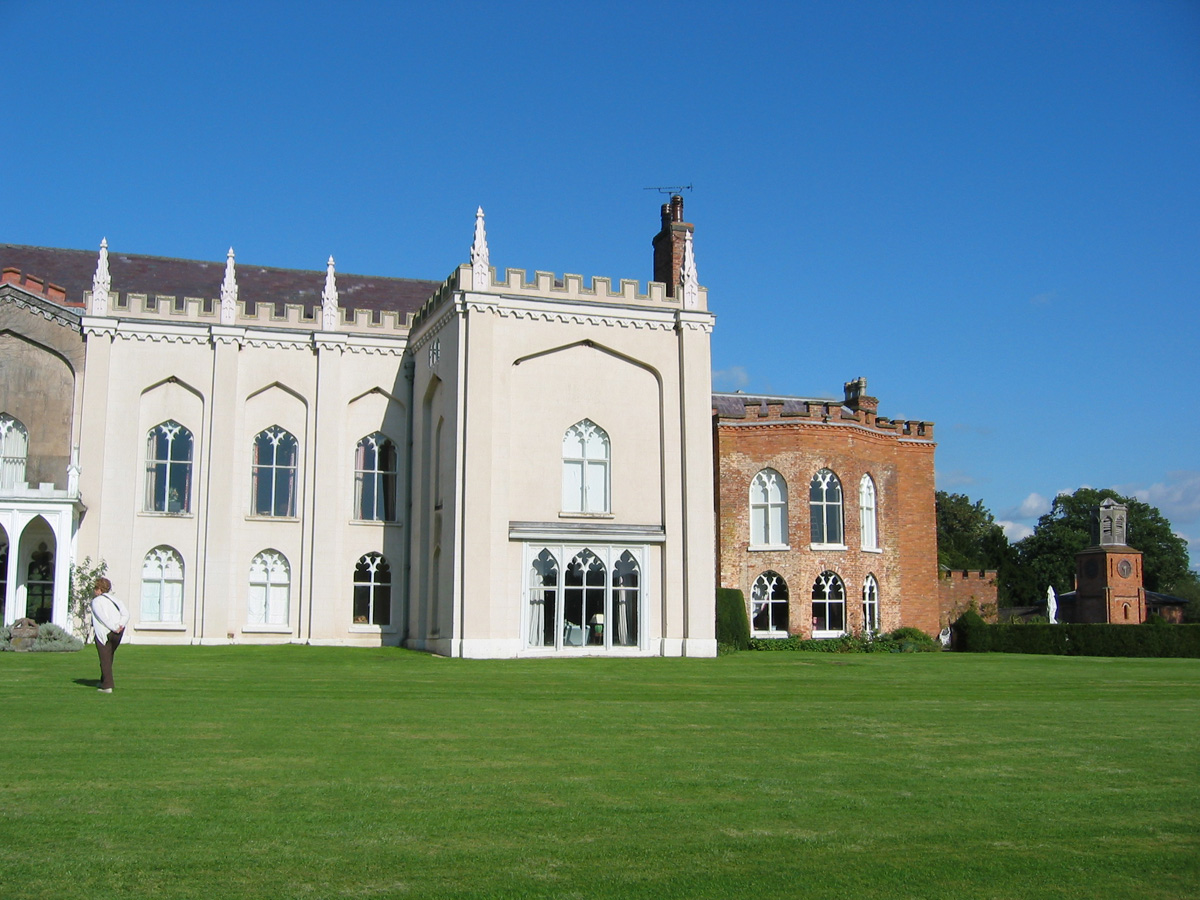
Combermere Abbey, the Cotton family seat in Cheshire

Sir Lynch Salusbury Cotton, 4th Baronet (c. 1705 – 14 August 1775) was a Member of Parliament (MP) for Denbighshire.

He was the son of Sir Thomas Cotton and his wife Philadelphia Lynch. He was the younger brother of the 3rd Baronet, Robert Salusbury Cotton who predeceased him without issue in 1748 and whom he thereby succeeded as 4th Baronet. He married a distant cousin, Elizabeth Abigail Cotton.

In December 1749 he replaced, unopposed, Sir Watkin Williams-Wynn as Knight of the Shire for Denbighshire, a seat he retained until 1774.

In 1769, he built St Mary's and St Michael's Church, Burleydam, near his family seat of Combermere Abbey in Cheshire.

He had four sons and was succeeded by his eldest son, Sir Robert Salusbury Cotton, 5th Baronet.

Parliament of Great Britain
Preceded by Sir Watkin Williams-Wynn, 3rd Bt.	Member of Parliament for Denbighshire; 1749–1774	Succeeded by Sir Watkin Williams-Wynn, 4th Bt.
Baronetage of England
Preceded by Robert Cotton	Baronet (of Combermere); 1748–1775	Succeeded by Robert Salusbury Cotton
