= Combermere Abbey =

Abbey in Cheshire, England

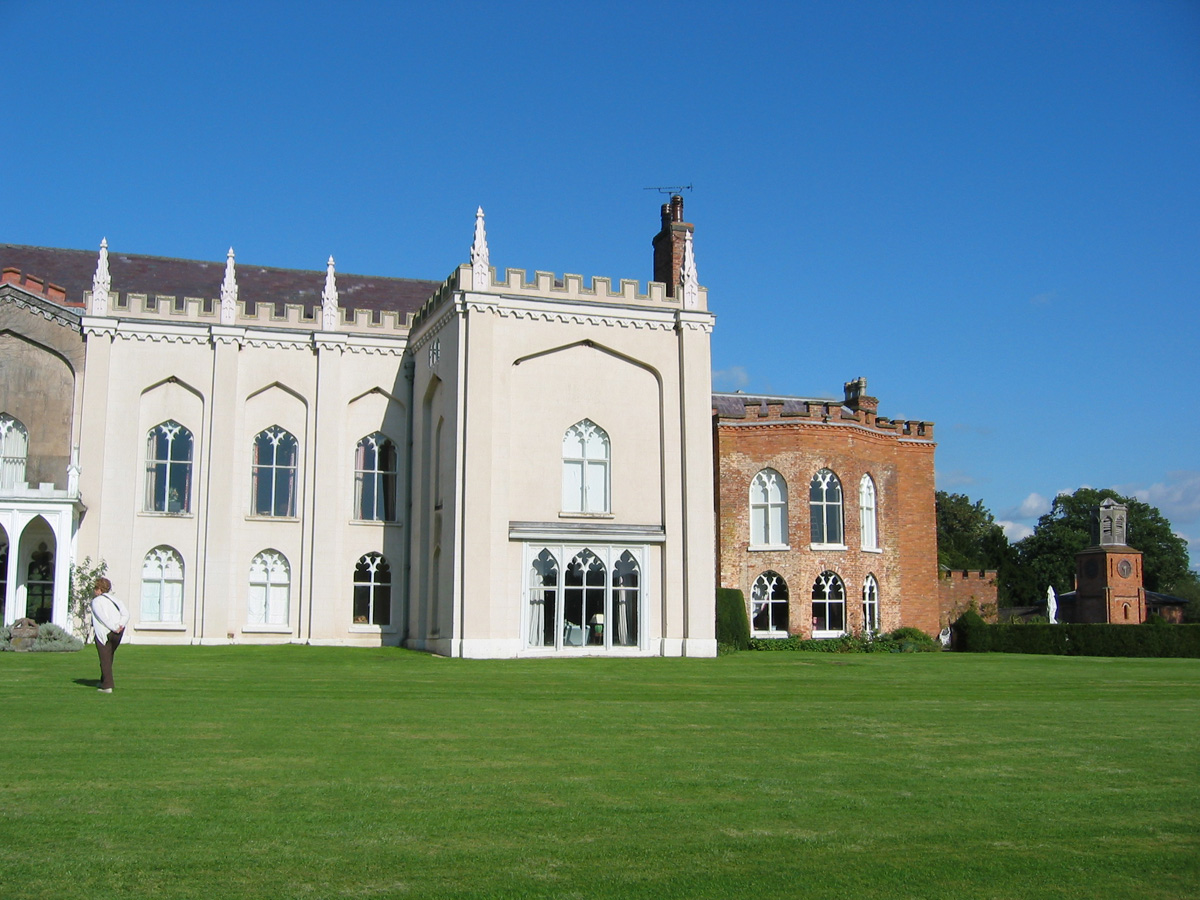
- Abbot's house and clock tower

- Location within Cheshire
- Interactive map of Combermere Abbey

Monastery information
- Order: Savigniac, Cistercian
- Established: ~1130
- Disestablished: 1538
- Dedication: Virgin Mary and St Michael
- Controlled churches: Acton, Baddiley, Church Coppenhall, Church Minshull, Nantwich, Wrenbury, Sandon, Alstonfield, Child's Ercall

People
- Founders: Hugh Malbank, 2nd Baron of Wich Malbank
- Important associated figures: William Malbank, 3rd Baron of Wich Malbank, Ranulf de Gernon, 4th Earl of Chester, Ranulf de Blondeville, 6th Earl of Chester

Site
- Location: Dodcott cum Wilkesley, Cheshire, England
- Coordinates: 52°59′37″N 2°36′50″W
- Grid reference: SJ 58726 44130
- Visible remains: Abbot's house
- Public access: Occasional

Listed Building – Grade I
- Official name: Combermere Abbey
- Designated: 10 June 1952
- Reference no.: 1136900

Combermere Abbey is a former monastery, later a country house, near Burleydam, between Nantwich, Cheshire and Whitchurch in Shropshire, England, located within Cheshire and near the border with Shropshire. Initially Savigniac and later Cistercian, the abbey was founded in the 1130s by Hugh Malbank, Baron of Nantwich, and was also associated with Ranulf de Gernons, Earl of Chester. The abbey initially flourished, but by 1275 was sufficiently deeply in debt to be removed from the abbot's management. From that date until its dissolution in 1538, it was frequently in royal custody, and acquired a reputation for poor discipline and violent disputes with both lay people and other abbeys. It was the third largest monastic establishment in Cheshire, based on net income in 1535.

After the dissolution it was acquired by Sir George Cotton, who demolished the church and most of the buildings, and converted part of the abbey into a country house. The house was remodelled in 1563 by Sir George's son, Richard Cotton, altered in 1795 by Sir Robert Cotton, and Gothicised in 1814–21 by Stapleton Cotton, Viscount Combermere. It remained in the Cotton family until 1919, and is still in private ownership.

The abbey is listed at grade I, with its North Wing now operating as a bed and breakfast. Its park includes the large lake of Comber Mere, a Site of Special Scientific Interest. A total of around 400 hectares (990 acres) of the park are listed at grade II; several structures are also listed, including a game larder at grade II*.

== Toponymy ==
The name Combermere means "lake of the Cumbri" – from Cymru, the native Welsh name for Wales – and refers to an enclave of Britons surviving the Anglo-Saxon conquest of the area.

== History of the abbey ==
=== Foundation and early years ===
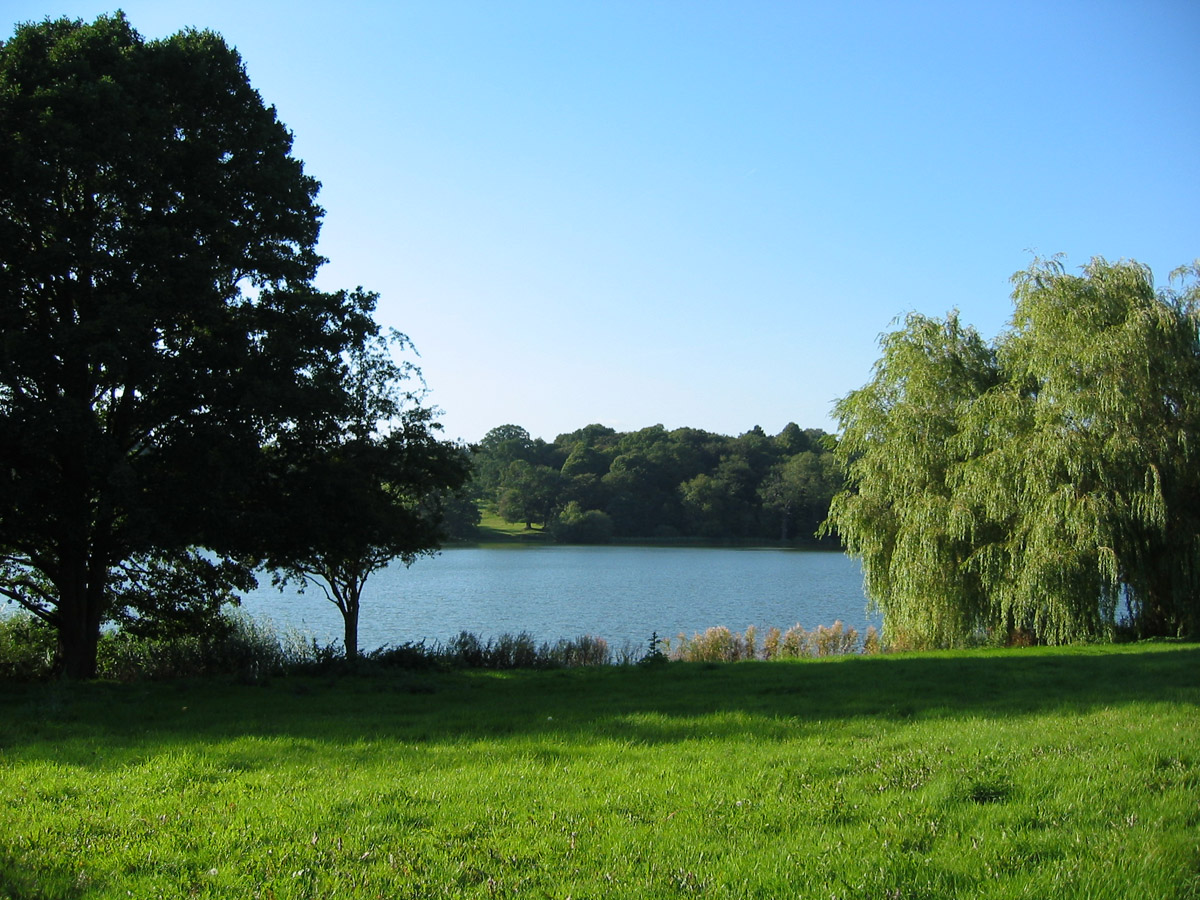
Comber Mere, the monastery's setting

Combermere Abbey was the earlier of the two great Cistercian abbeys in Cheshire, the other being Vale Royal. The abbey was dedicated to the Virgin Mary and Saint Michael, and originally belonged to the Savigniac order, which merged with the Cistercian order by 1147. Hugh Malbank, the second Baron of Wich Malbank (now Nantwich), was the founder, and the original donation occurred early in the 12th century. It was confirmed in 1130 by Ranulf de Gernons (also Ranulf II), the fourth Earl of Chester, who was one of the witnesses of its foundation charter. Other witnesses included Hugh Malbank's son, William, and Roger de Clinton, the Bishop of Coventry. Building of the abbey commenced slightly later, possibly in 1133, often stated as the date of foundation. The site given for the monastery buildings was a wooded area by the large lake of Comber Mere, a peaceful and isolated location near the Shropshire border, suitable for the austere Savigniac order. Little or nothing is known of the early abbey buildings. The first abbot was named William.

A copy of the foundation charter survives. The original grant included the manor of Wilkesley, comprising two Domesday manors worth 18 shillings pre-Conquest; the villages of Dodcott, Lodmore and Royal; land at Burleydam; a mill and fishery at Chorley; and woods at Brentwood, Light Birchwood and Butterley Heyes. It also included a quarter of Nantwich, the largest salt producer in the county until the 17th century, with a tithe of the barony's salt revenues. The abbey was also given the church at Acton and its associated chapel of Nantwich, as well as two churches in Staffordshire, at Sandon and Alstonfield. The abbey later appropriated the church of Child's Ercall in Shropshire and the Cheshire churches and chapels of Baddiley, Church Coppenhall, Church Minshull and Wrenbury. Numerous other grants of land followed in the 12th and early 13th centuries, mainly in the south of Cheshire and the adjacent counties of Staffordshire and Shropshire, but also in Derbyshire. Other benefactors included William Malbank, who confirmed his father's grant and added further land, Robert de Ferrers, the Earl of Derby, William FitzAlan, William FitzRanulph and Ivo Pantulf, and later Ranulph de Blondeville (also Ranulph III), the Earl of Chester, Roger of Ightfield, Gilbert de Macclesfield, James de Audley and Robert de Baskerville.

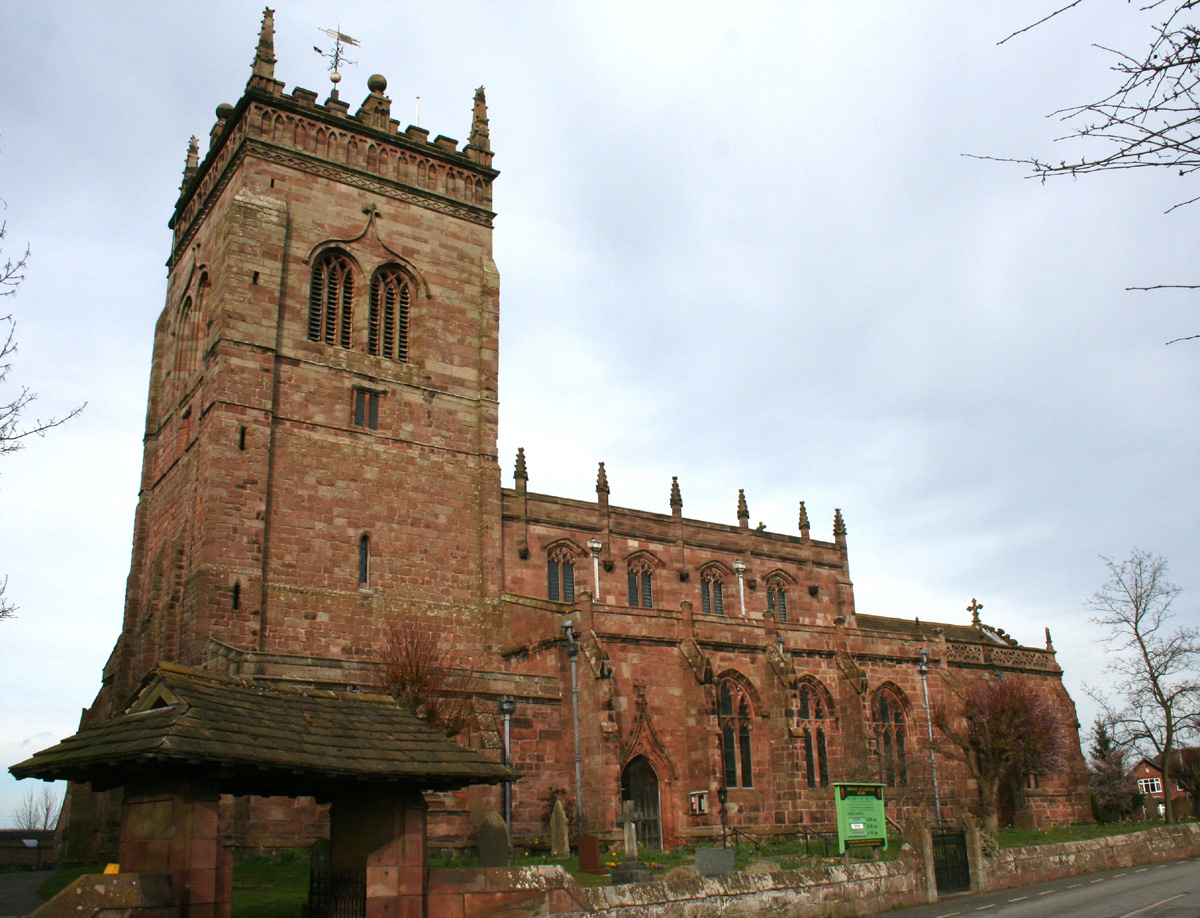
St Mary's, Acton and its associated chapels were given to the abbey. This building originates in the 13th century.

The early history of Combermere is obscure as most of its records were destroyed before the 17th century. (Note: The main surviving record is "The Book of the Abbot of Combermere", which includes copies of leases and rent rolls for the abbey's possessions in Nantwich from 1289 until a decade before the dissolution; it was partly compiled in 1524 by John Massy, later the abbey's final abbot.) For the first hundred or so years after its foundation, the abbey appears to have been reasonably prosperous. In 1146–53, Abbot William successfully founded a daughter house at Poulton, which was endowed by Robert Pincerna (also Robert the Butler); it later moved to a site near Leek, Staffordshire, becoming Dieulacres Abbey. Both Combermere and Poulton are mentioned in about 1195 as Cistercian foundations in the area surrounding Chester. Several other daughter houses followed. Stanlow Abbey on the Wirral Peninsula was founded in 1178 by John FitzRichard, Baron of Halton, later moving to Whalley Abbey in Lancashire, and in 1219, a small daughter house was founded at Hulton in Staffordshire by Henry de Audley. In 1220, the abbot was reprimanded for unauthorised building, but an inspection by Abbot Stephen of Lexington in 1231 found no particular problems with the abbey. Combermere received a royal visit in 1245, and at that time the abbey was granted a market and fair at what is now known as Market Drayton in Shropshire.

Combermere established granges before 1237 at nearby Acton and Burland, Wincle in east Cheshire, and Cliff and Shifford in Shropshire. Wincle was a particularly large holding of pastureland in Macclesfield Forest, given by Ranulf de Blondeville. By the end of the 13th century, Chesthill, Ditchley, Dodcott, Newton, Smeaton, Wilkesley (Heyfields) and Yarlet were also included among its granges. The abbey is known to have been farming sheep by the mid-13th century, earlier than the other major Cheshire monasteries. Combermere was producing six sacks of wool annually, worth 10 1/2–21 marks per sack, which were being sold at the fair at Boston in Lincolnshire, and also exported abroad. These figures are, however, much lower than monasteries in neighbouring counties.

=== Decline ===
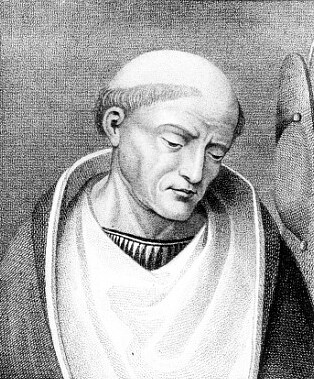
Henry Beaufort, one of many men put in charge of the abbey

The mid-13th century saw the start of the abbey's decline, with a succession of financial problems and scandals. In 1253, its creditors were prevented from seizing its flocks, if the debt could be settled by another means. In 1275, the abbey's debts were so great that its management was assigned to the Lord Chancellor and Bishop of Bath and Wells, Robert Burnell, and the following year it was placed under royal protection for two years. Edward I's war against Wales of 1282–83 drew heavily on Cheshire and placed additional strain on the monastery; it ran so low on food stores in 1283 that it was exempted from providing supplies for the army and once again removed from the abbot's management. Burnell contributed £213 towards the abbey's needs – a sum considerably in excess of its annual income, estimated in 1318 at £130 14s 11d – receiving lands in Monks Coppenhall (now Crewe) in return. Royal custody was renewed in 1315–21, from 1328, and again from 1412; the 15th-century custodians included Henry Beaufort, the Bishop of Winchester. The abbey's impoverished state persisted throughout the 14th and 15th centuries; in 1496, it was exempted from tax for this reason.

The reasons for the abbey's abrupt descent into debt are unclear. The monks and abbot attributed their situation in 1328 to financial mismanagement by earlier abbots, who had leased out many of the abbey's estates to tenants, often at poor terms. Local historian Frank Latham has speculated that the abbey's proximity to the Chester–Shrewsbury road proved an intolerable drain on its resources:the abbey was one of four to complain to Edward, the Black Prince in 1351 about the cost of providing hospitality to guests and their servants, horses and hunting hounds. In the early 15th century, previous abbots were again blamed for the abbey's poverty, this time for disposing of timber from the abbey's woods and allowing its buildings to fall into disrepair.

The abbots and monks were involved in many violent disputes with outsiders from the 13th century onwards. In 1281, a feud with the Abbey of Saint-Evroul in Orne over the church at Drayton, which Combermere was leasing from the French abbey, culminated in a group of monks, including the abbot, being excommunicated for guarding the church "like a castle" and stopping the Archbishop of Canterbury from entering. In 1309, a dispute between Richard of Fullshurst and the abbot had to be mediated by Edward II. The abbot was twice assaulted, and Fullshurst led two raids on the abbey, murdering the prior, burning buildings, stealing goods and laying ambushes to prevent the abbot's return. The attacks were repeated in 1344, leading to the abbot's ejection, while in 1360, it was the abbot who was accused of retaliating against Sir Robert Fullshurst. In 1365, long-standing tensions with the abbey's daughter house at Whalley escalated into Combermere occupying the Lancashire abbey, and attempting to eject its abbot. Several conflicts between the abbey and its tenants were recorded in the 15th century, with the most serious incident being the murder of Abbot Richard Alderwas in 1446 by John Bagh of Dodcot, a labourer, who shot the abbot with a bow and arrow.

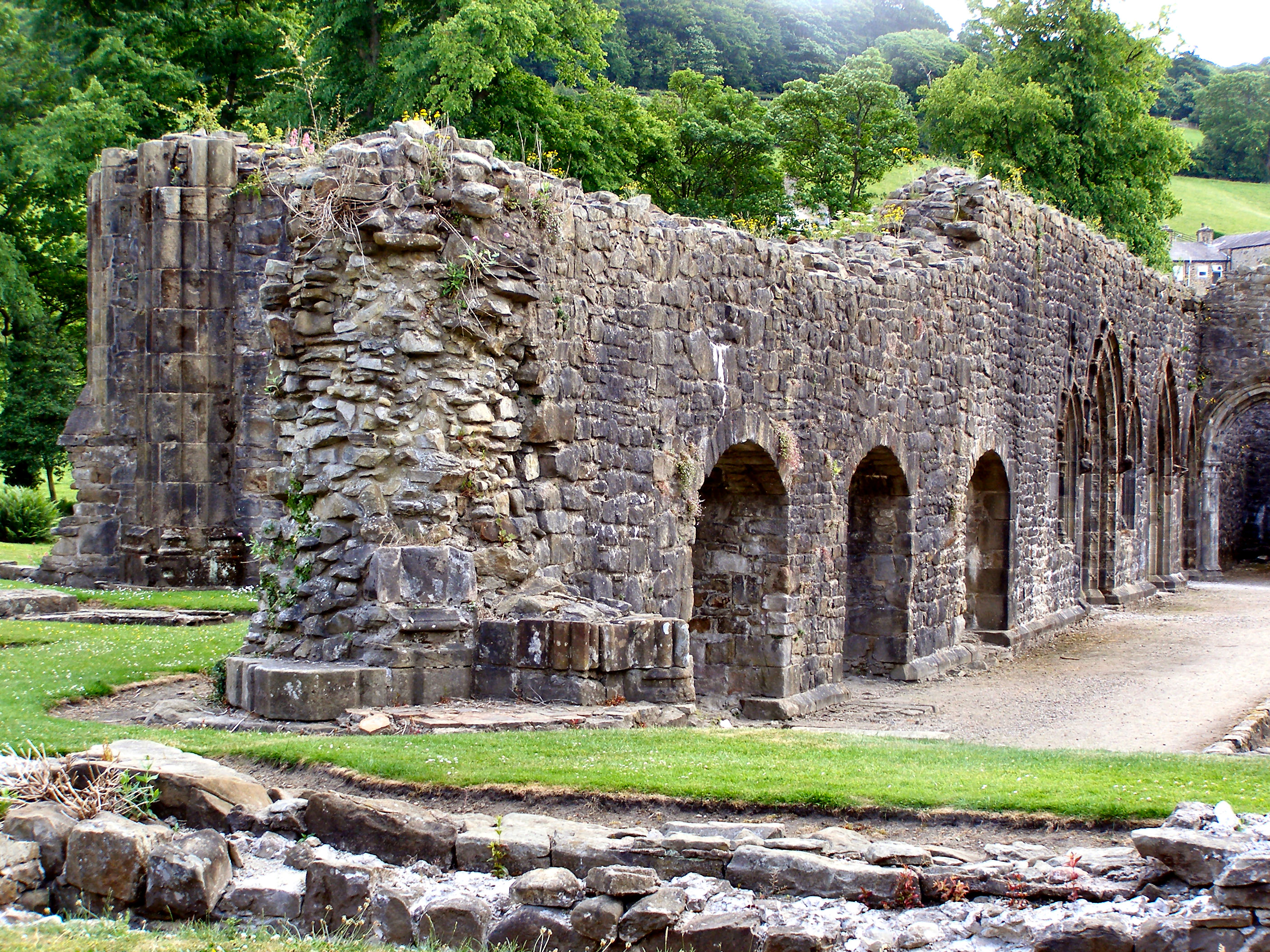
Ruins of the daughter abbey, Whalley, which Combermere occupied in 1365

The Black Death pandemic of 1348–49 is likely to have affected Combermere. The abbey's numbers are known for the first time in 1379, when there were nine monks, plus the abbot. Discipline appears to have broken down and the abbey had an unsavoury reputation, which it retained up until its dissolution. One monk was accused of theft in 1385, and later described as being "vagabond, apostate and obdurate". In 1414, Abbot William Plymouth was accused of forging gold coins; he had been demoted by 1418. There seem to have been internal power struggles around this time: two monks, Roger Hoggeson of Holyhurst and Richard Tenche of Lodmore, were accused of various crimes, including forcibly taking over the abbey and making off with books worth £100; although the two were acquitted, Hoggeson and another monk were later outlawed. In 1520, a monk was murdered by a servant of Abbot Christopher Walley; the prior was accused of covering up the murder and sheltering the murderer, because of the abbey's "evil name for using of misrule."

Shortly before its dissolution, Combermere had a brief period of salt production. John Leland records in around 1535 that part of a wooded hill about a mile from the abbey subsided into a salt pit, and the abbot started to make salt; however, objections from the local salt industry soon put a stop to the practice. Production appears to have restarted after the dissolution, but largely ceased during Elizabeth I's reign.

=== Dissolution ===
The abbey's revenues in the Valor Ecclesiasticus of 1535 amounted to £258 6s 6d, including £15 3s 4d of salt revenues from Nantwich. The net income was £225 9s 7d, after expenses including rent, charitable donations and payments to a steward, an auditor and several bailiffs. This net income placed it as the third wealthiest monastic establishment in Cheshire, after St Werburgh's Abbey in Chester (£1030) and Vale Royal Abbey (£518). Combermere received its visitation from Thomas Cromwell's commissioners, Richard Layton and Thomas Legh, in February 1536, at which time its debts were assessed at £160. As with the other Cheshire abbeys, Combermere leased many properties on very long leases during its last few years, several within its final months.

The last abbot, John Massey, seems not to have contested the dissolution particularly vigorously. He visited London in May 1538, bearing a letter of support from Rowland Lee, the Bishop of Coventry and Lichfield, but his visit was to no avail. The abbey was dissolved by Layton on 27 July 1538 (1539 in some sources). Combermere then had twelve monks, plus the abbot, an increase on the 14th-century numbers. It held 22,000 acres (89 square kilometres (34 sq mi)) of land in Cheshire, Shropshire, Staffordshire and Derbyshire. Massey received a pension of £50 per annum (which he was still taking in 1563), and the monks also received pensions.

In August 1539, the abbey and its estates, which had been revalued at £275 17s 11 1/2d, were granted to Sir George Cotton, an esquire of the body to Henry VIII, and his wife, Mary. The abbey site at that time included a church with a steeple or bell-tower, and a cemetery.

== History of the country house ==
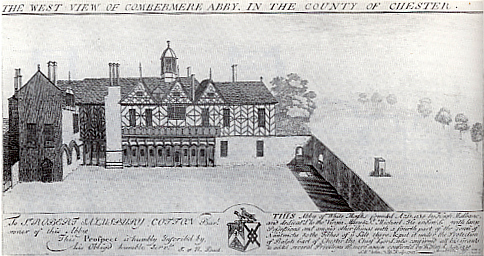
Engraving of 1727, showing the east face with cloisters

=== 16th–18th centuries ===
After the abbey's dissolution, the church and part of the monastery buildings were demolished. A building in the west range, usually now considered to represent the Abbot's House, was converted into a country house for the Cotton family. The hammerbeam roof timbers of the Great Hall have recently been dated to 1502, confirming the incorporation of a monastic building. Sir George's son, Richard Cotton, redesigned the house in 1563. His remodelling is commemorated by a stone tablet, uncovered in 1795, which reads:

Master Richard Cotton and his sons three
Both for their pleasure and commoditie
This building did edifie
In fifteen hundred and sixty three

The abbey under his ownership is the subject of what is believed to be the earliest country house poem, "To Richard Cotton, Esq.," composed by Geoffrey Whitney in 1586. It compares the abbey to a beehive:

A stately seat, whose like is hard to find,
Where mighty Jove the horn of plenty lends:
With fish, and fowl, and cattle sundry flocks;
Where crystal springs do gush out of the rocks.
There, fertile fields, there, meadows large extend;
There, store of grain with water and with wood.
And in this place, your golden time you spend,
Unto your praise, and to your country's good
This is the hive, your tenants are the bees –
And in the same, have places by degrees.

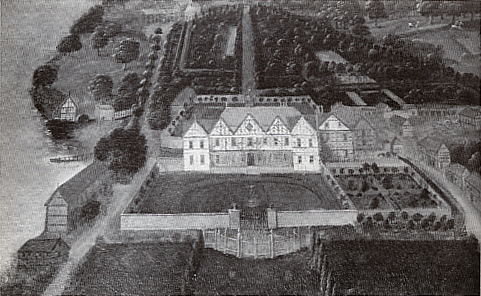
House and gardens c.1730

Richard Cotton's alterations to the Great Hall (now the library) are thought to include concealing the hammerbeam roof with a plaster ceiling and putting in a fireplace. Timbers in one of the bedrooms have been dated to around this time. It is unclear whether he installed a grand staircase to access the Hall, which is on the first floor. The room's existing screen is believed to date from somewhat later; it is known to have been moved at some point from its original northern position to the south side of the Hall, where it now stands. William III stayed at the house in 1690, while travelling to the Battle of the Boyne, and his visit may have been the cause of internal reorganisation. The room where the king is thought to have slept, known as the Orange Bedroom, is adjacent to the Great Hall; its timbers have been dated to 1546–81. There is also evidence for building work in around 1725.

The house during this period is known mainly from two 18th-century pictures. The earliest, an engraving by Samuel and Nathaniel Buck dating from 1727, shows the east face, formerly the monastery's cloisters, arcades from which are still present attached to the centre of the façade. The second is an oil painting of around 1730, which depicts an aerial view of the house and gardens, including the west face of the house, then the entrance front. The ground floor is partly stone, with half-timbering in a herringbone pattern on the first storey, and three gables above forming attics. The roof is topped by a cupola above the entrance, both slightly off-central. The entrance (west) face has paired projecting gabled wings, and another wing projects at the rear.

Samuel Johnson stayed at the abbey in July 1774 with Hester Thrale, who was related to the Cottons. He writes:

The house is spacious, but not magnificent; built at different times, with different materials; part is of timber, part of stone or brick, plastered and painted to look like timber – It is the best house that I ever saw of that kind

The house appears to have remained little altered from its 16th-century form when Johnson visited, possibly in part because the Cottons had acquired by marriage the much larger property of Lleweni Hall in Denbighshire, Wales. Sir Robert Salusbury Cotton moved to Combermere Abbey in 1773, and later sold Lleweni. He remodelled and extended the abbey in around 1795, perhaps to his own designs; Robert Mylne was employed at this time.

=== Stapleton Cotton's alterations ===
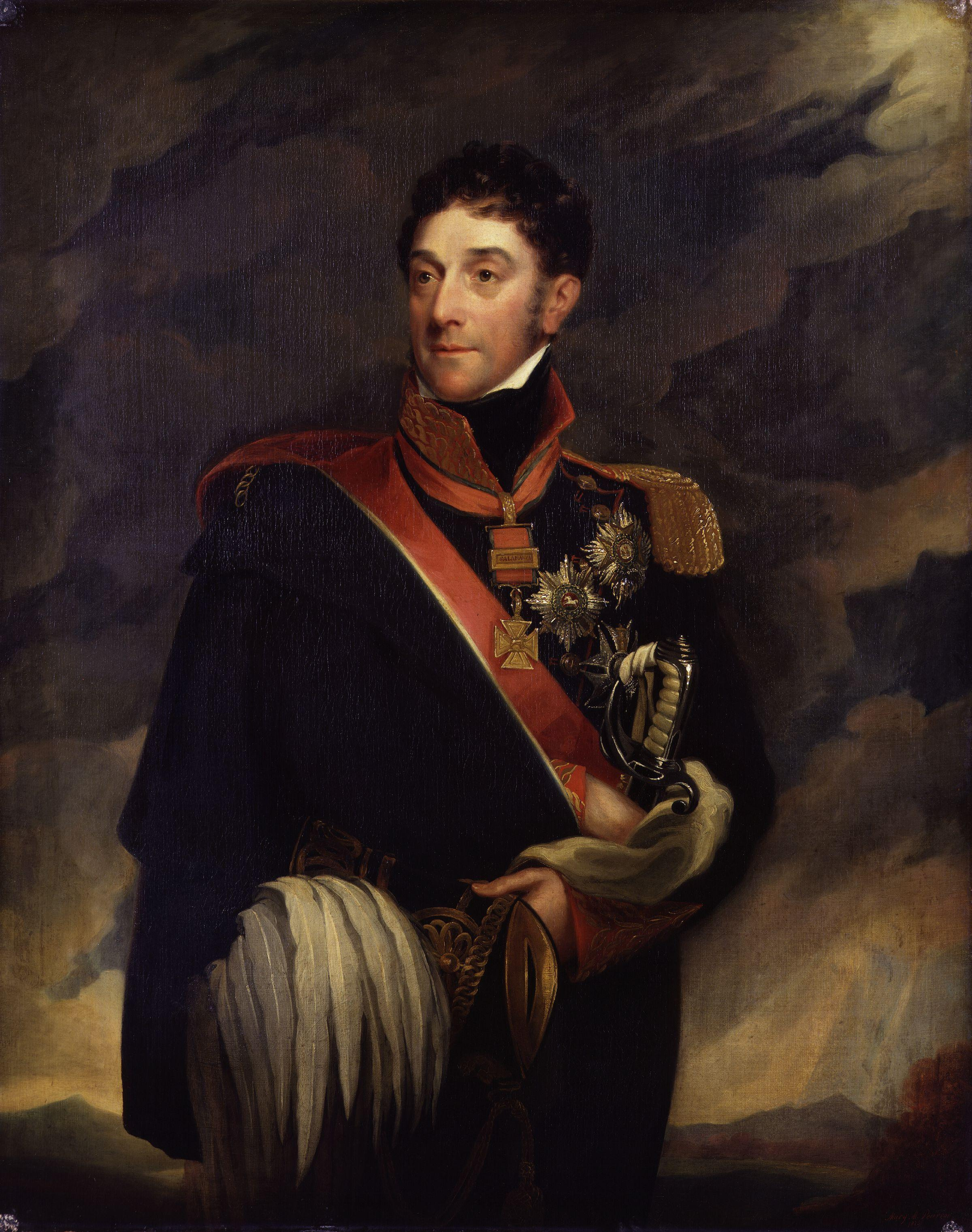
The 1st Viscount Combermere was a military hero who Gothicised the house.

The existing abbey largely owes its appearance to the alterations of diplomat and military leader, Sir Stapleton Cotton. He was created Baron Combermere in 1814 (later Viscount Combermere) and awarded an annual pension of £2,000 for his service during the Napoleonic Wars. Between 1814 and 1821, he faced the house with cement render and added Gothic ornamentation, including castellations and pointed arches surrounding the windows. The rendering was put on timber battens, which were fixed "like stage scenery" to the original timber frame. A large service wing with bedrooms was thrown out to the south, and a north wing including a dining room, known as Wellington's Wing, was also built to mark Wellington's visit to the house in 1820. On the interior, he redesigned the library. In 1821, a visitor described the house as "recently coated and ornamented in the pointed Gothic style." The first Viscount Combermere is said to have been the model for W. M. Thackeray's Sir George Tufto in The Book of Snobs, and architectural historians Peter de Figueiredo and Julian Treuherz consider his alterations to "exhibit a love of empty-headed show."

The first viscount later commissioned two projects to remodel the abbey completely; the first, of around 1829, employed Irish architects Sir Richard and William Vitruvius Morrison, and the second, Edward Blore. Neither were carried out, although the Morrisons built Stone Lodge and probably some service buildings, while Blore designed the stable block. Further alterations in 1854 included constructing a long entrance hall (since partly demolished), which protruded from the east face. Restoration work was carried out by John Tarring in 1860. The first viscount died in 1865, and 25 years later, a monumental obelisk was erected in his memory on the edge of the park, under the terms of his widow's will.

=== Late 19th and early 20th centuries ===
His son, Wellington Stapleton-Cotton, 2nd Viscount Combermere, did some further work on the house in the 1870s, but the family's fortunes declined in the later 19th century. The second Viscount twice rented the abbey to the Empress Elisabeth of Austria in 1881 and 1882. A total of £10,000-worth of alterations were made for her stays, including installing hot water and an electric bell system; the costs were met by the Emperor. A keen huntswoman, the Empress's 80-strong retinue included 25 grooms, and she hunted frequently with the Cheshire Hunt.

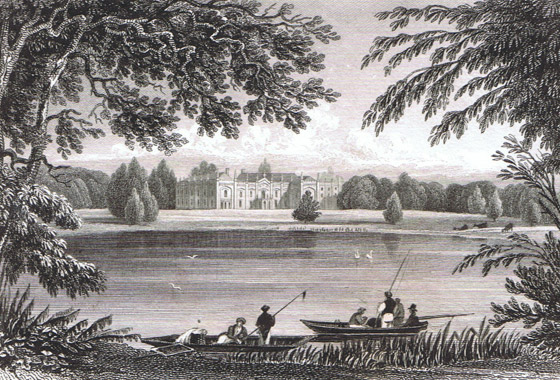
The abbey and lake in 1829

The second viscount died in 1891. While his funeral was taking place, Sybell Corbet, Lady Combermere's sister, took a photograph in the abbey's library that became famous as "Lord Combermere's Ghost Photo", said to show his ghost sitting in a chair. Parapsychologist Sir William Barrett, who investigated the photograph in 1895, surmised that the "ghost" was a servant, but the late viscount's daughter-in-law stated that the male servants in the house were all much younger in appearance and the outside servants were attending the funeral.

Robert Stapleton-Cotton, 3rd Viscount Combermere led a "rackety life" and further eroded the family's wealth; he tried without success to sell the estate in 1893. Katherine, Duchess of Westminster leased the abbey in 1898–1917. In 1919, Francis Stapleton-Cotton, 4th Viscount Combermere sold Combermere Abbey and part of the estate to Sir Kenneth Crossley of Crossley Motors. An aircraft enthusiast, Sir Kenneth often flew his Tiger Moth from the estate. During the Second World War, the house was used as a hospital and school, and the Wrenbury Home Guard – of which Sir Kenneth was a member – did fieldcraft training exercises in the park. His only son, writer and MP Anthony Crossley, had been killed in an aeroplane crash shortly before the war, and when Sir Kenneth died in 1957, the estate passed to his granddaughter, Penelope Callander, later Lady Lindsay.

=== Reduction and restoration ===
The 19th-century rendering led to problems with dry rot. By the early 1970s the house had become so dilapidated that Raymond Erith and Quinlan Terry proposed the radical solution of rebuilding it entirely. This was rejected but maintenance problems eventually led to work carried out by A. H. Brotherton in 1975, including the demolition of Wellington's Wing and part of the 19th-century south wing, and reduction of the remainder of the south wing to two storeys. The present owner (as of 2013), Lady Lindsay's daughter, Sarah Callander Beckett, took over the estate in 1992.

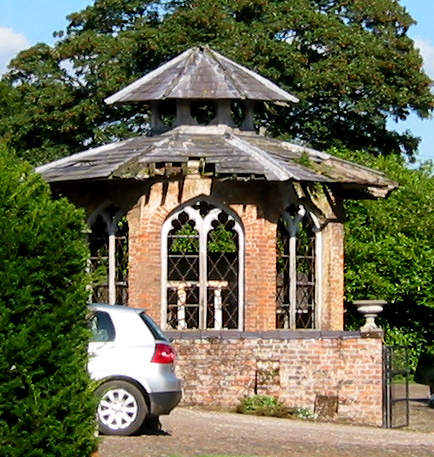
Game larder before restoration

Combermere Abbey was entered on English Heritage's "Buildings at Risk" register in 1998, when it was first compiled. The abbey is partially occupied. Restoration work in 2010–12, supervised by Andrew Arrol and funded by grants from English Heritage and the Heritage Conservation Trust, has focused on the library, after structural problems were discovered in the east wall. As of 2013, the empty north wing is described as in a "parlous condition" and assessed as "very bad," the most at risk grade. Based on an inspection in May 2012, English Heritage fears that the north wing is in considerable danger of falling down, which would be likely to seriously damage the oldest parts of the abbey. The north wing has been protected since around 2001 by scaffolding bearing a roof, which has slowed but not halted its deterioration. The repair work necessary has been estimated as costing £2 million.

Attempts to gain planning permission to build a village of a hundred houses on 14 acres (57,000 m^{2}) of greenfield estate land, with the stated aim of funding restoration of the abbey, met with substantial opposition and were turned down in 2005. A subsequent scheme to build 43 houses on a greenfield site south of the nearby small village of Aston, as an "enabling development" to fund repairs to the north wing, again met with opposition; it was rejected by Cheshire East in April 2012 for having "insufficient public benefit ... to outweigh the harm in terms of new residential development in the Open Countryside." The decision was overturned on appeal in January 2013.

Many of the abbey's outbuildings were derelict in the late 20th century. The stables were restored and converted into luxury holiday cottages in 1994–97. Restoration of the game larder and clock tower was completed in the early 21st century, removing the former from the at risk register.

== Description ==
Little remains of the original monastic buildings, although remnants of medieval stonework from an arch are concealed in a cupboard in the house, and pieces of carved stone have been found in the grounds. The existing house, a grade I listed building, incorporates a building from the west range of the monastery, generally considered to represent the Abbot's House. It has a timber frame with a late-medieval false hammerbeam roof, described by de Figueiredo and Treuherz as "extremely fine" and "exceptionally grand." The timbers are decorated with coats of arms, including those of the abbey, and elaborate bosses to the centre of the trusses. Hammerbeam roofs are rare in Cheshire; the only other known examples are at Vale Royal Abbey and St Nicholas' Chapel in the park of Cholmondeley Castle. The north end of the Great Hall retains the abbey's dais canopy, and in the centre is a smoke bay and louvre.

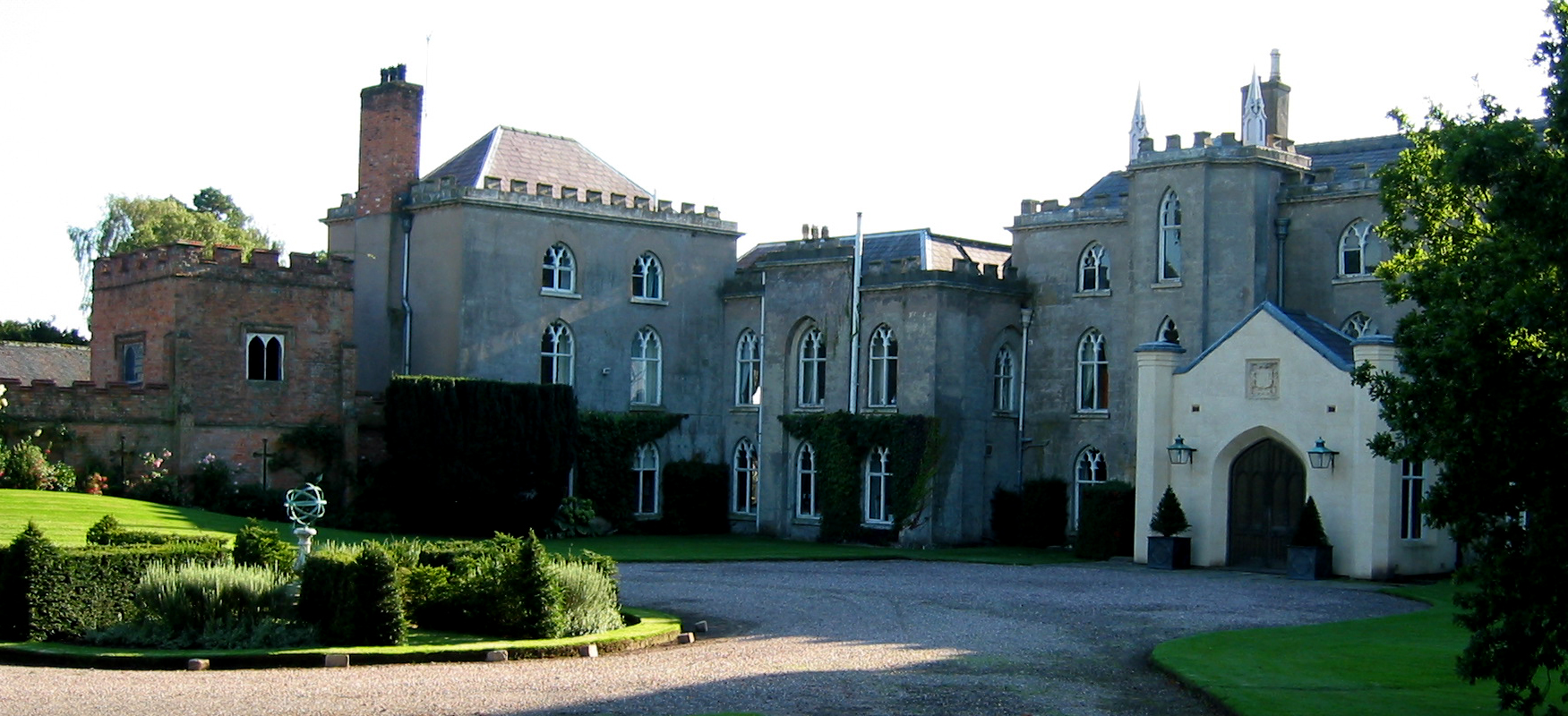
East face, showing the entrance porch (right) and part of the service court (left)

De Figueiredo and Treuherz write: "Seen from a distance, Combermere appears as a romantic ivy-clad vision of battlements and pinnacles. But its detail is coarse, its massing inept..." Most of the exterior remains coated in grey cement render, in part painted white. The windows throughout feature Y-tracery and are headed with cusped arches. The parapets all have battlements and the roofs are of slate.

The east (entrance) face has three storeys. In the centre is a projecting gabled single-storey porch bearing a stone panel with the Cotton family arms; it is flanked by octagonal turrets. To the south (left) is an octagonal turret. The projecting wing to the south has been reduced to two storeys. To the north (right) of the entrance porch was the Wellington Wing, now demolished. Parts of the render on the north wing have fallen off, revealing the timber frame to the upper storeys, which has ornamental panelling including roundel designs, and carved quatrefoil and fleur-de-lys motifs to the main timbers.

The west (lakeside) face has eight bays, with projecting wings at each end, which each have triple windows to the ground floor. The bays on this face have full-height recessed arches and are separated by pilasters. The single-storey Gothic-style porch is set asymmetrically and consists of three arches; above it is a slight gable. To the south (right) of the southern wing is a further recessed wing which has been reduced to two storeys, with the render removed to expose red brick; it has a two-storey canted bay window.

Over the last 25 years, the abbey has undergone extensive restoration, with the Nina Campbell-designed North Wing now accommodation for guests.

=== Interior ===
On the ground floor, the main room is the former entrance hall to the west porch, which was adapted into a narrow dining room after the main entrance was moved to the east side. Its interior features date from the early 19th century. The room is crossed by two screens, each flanked with clustered columns whose "delicate" capitals are decorated with lilies and leaves, described as acanthus or lotus. Similar columns also flank the room's marble chimneypiece. The leaf design is repeated on the coving of the modern entrance hall and internal passage. The passage also has clustered columns rising to cast-iron arches in the Perpendicular Gothic style, which de Figueiredo and Treuherz liken to those in the early-19th-century version of Eaton Hall by William Porden.

Originally the Great Hall, the library on the first floor remains the principal reception room of the house. It is separated from the landing at the south end by a "magnificent" carved wooden screen, which probably dates from the early 17th century. The "handsome and boldly-carved design" includes pilasters with lions on the bases flanking paired double doors with arched heads and satyrs in the spandrels, and also incorporates carved cherubs and grotesques, and painted panels to the external (landing) face; it is surmounted by a central emblem. The carved wooden panelling above the stone fireplace incorporates four painted portraits, including Henry VIII and Sir George Cotton, and dates from the 16th and 17th centuries. The remaining panelling in the library is not original. The hammerbeam roof is concealed by a decorated plasterwork ceiling, probably dating from the 17th century. It has broad coving decorated with painted coats of arms, probably added in the 19th century.

=== Service buildings ===
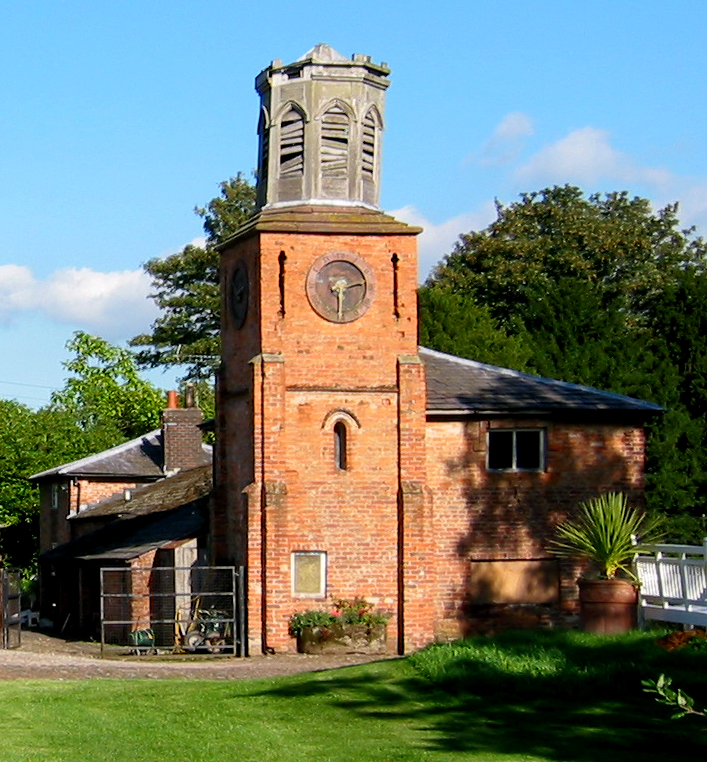
Clock tower

The surviving service buildings to the abbey mainly date from the 18th and 19th centuries, and are predominantly constructed in red brick. Many feature Gothic ornamentation. A service court consisting of two ranges dating from the 18th or early 19th century stands adjacent to the house on the south-east side; the ranges are both listed at grade II. The north range features lancet windows, cross-shaped arrowslits and a parapet with battlements; it includes an octagonal turret and a water tower, both with battlements. The south range includes a square clock tower, built in 1815 to celebrate the Battle of Waterloo; the clock is by JB Joyce & Co. The tower is decorated with arrowslits and capped by an octagonal timber bell cote. Standing in the courtyard is a grade-II*-listed game larder, probably by the Irish Morrison family, which dates from the early 19th century. The octagonal structure is topped with an octagonal wooden lantern. The original ironwork on which game was hung remains in the interior.

The Elizabethan-style stable block dates from 1837 and was designed by Edward Blore. It forms a quadrangle surrounding a rectangular courtyard and incorporates two cottages and a former carriage house. It has stone dressings and features lancet windows, square lead-roofed turrets and an octagonal-flued chimneystack. The arched main entrance is flanked by narrow octagonal turrets topped with spirelets. A ruined icehouse dating from the 18th or 19th century stands near the stables. It consists of a barrel-vaulted passage leading to a chamber with a domed roof. Both buildings are listed at grade II.

Combermere Park. Dashed lines show private tracks (no public right of way)

== Combermere Park ==
=== History ===
In the early 18th century, the abbey had large formal gardens. The c. 1730 painting shows the west face, then the entrance front, with a walled forecourt and prominent entrance gates. Formal gardens extend at the rear (east) with trees, ponds and a long straight drive running perpendicular to the house; another small garden with cross-shaped paths lies to the south. Westbury Manor, Long Island, USA now has a gate screen thought to be by Robert Bakewell, originally from Combermere's gardens. The painting shows a summer house on Summerhouse Island, believed to date from around 1700.

The main access to the park at that date was from the west, via a narrow strip of land which formerly separated the main lake from a smaller one to the south. This was excavated during the second half of the 18th century to extend the lake nearer the west face of the house. It is unknown when the park was first landscaped, but it is believed to have contained many mature trees by the 1790s. Sir Robert Salusbury Cotton landscaped the park in 1795–97, possibly employing John Webb. Webb is also said to have designed Brankelow Cottage on the west side of the lake, built in 1797.

=== Description ===
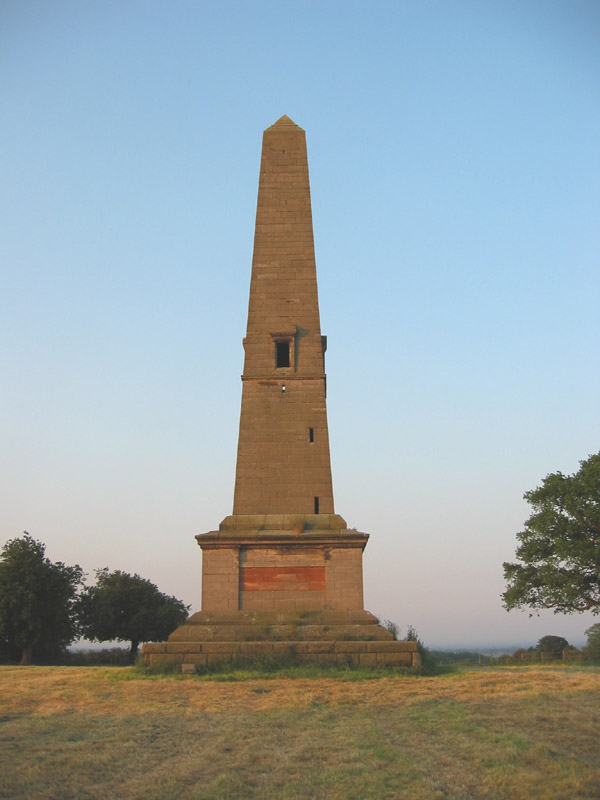
Memorial obelisk

The modern estate extends to 1,110 acres (450 ha), mainly in Cheshire and extending into Shropshire, and is run as an organic dairy farm. The National Register of Historic Parks and Gardens lists 990 acres (400 ha) of the park at grade II. The gardens include a walled garden of 5 acres (2 ha), in which a maze of fruit trees was created in the 1990s.

The park contains several buildings and structures which are listed at grade II. A sandstone sundial near the house is believed to incorporate the remains of a Romanesque column from the 12th-century abbey. Stone Lodge, formerly the gate lodge at the main (south-east) entrance to the park, has recently been converted into a holiday cottage. The sandstone Elizabethan-style building, by William Vitruvius Morrison, dates from around 1828 and bears two Cotton coats of arms.

Brankelow Cottage, a "charming eyecatcher," stands to the west of Comber Mere at SJ581442. Built as a model dairy, it was used as a gamekeeper's cottage and is now a folly; the pavilions to each end were formerly used as kennels. It is ornamented with battlements, pinnacles, pilasters, arrowslit windows and fancy brickwork. A sandstone obelisk dated 1890, which commemorates the first Viscount Combermere, stands at SJ576448 on a rise at the north-west edge of the park.

=== Comber Mere ===
The park includes the natural lake of Comber Mere. Covering an area of around 132 acres (53 ha), it is the largest lake in a private English park. An area of 169 acres (68.5 ha) of the mere and its surrounding land has been designated a Site of Special Scientific Interest for its swamp and fen environments, as well as its importance for birds. The mere is an important overwintering ground for wildfowl, and also has one of the largest heronries in Cheshire.

== See also ==
- Grade I listed buildings in Cheshire
- Listed buildings in Dodcott cum Wilkesley
- List of monastic houses in Cheshire
- List of monastic houses in England

== Notes and references ==
=== Sources ===
- Cheshire Federation of Women's Institutes. The Cheshire Village Book (Countryside Books & CFWI; 1990) (ISBN 1-85306-075-5)
- de Figueiredo P, Treuherz J. Cheshire Country Houses (Phillimore; 1988) (ISBN 0-85033-655-4)
- Driver JT. Cheshire in the Later Middle Ages. A History of Cheshire, Vol. 6 (Series Editor: JJ Bagley), (Cheshire Community Council; 1971)
- Elrington CR, Harris BE (eds). "Houses of Cistercian monks: The abbey of Combermere" A History of the County of Chester (Vol. 3) (Institute of Historical Research; 1980)
- Griffiths A. Wellington: His Comrades and Contemporaries (George Allen; 1897)
- Hartwell C, Hyde M, Hubbard E, Pevsner N. The Buildings of England: Cheshire (2nd edn) (Yale University Press; 2011) (ISBN 978 0 300 17043 6)
- Hewitt HJ. Cheshire Under the Three Edwards. A History of Cheshire, Vol. 5 (Series Editor: JJ Bagley) (Cheshire Community Council; 1967)
- Husain BMC. Cheshire under the Norman Earls: 1066–1237. A History of Cheshire, Vol. 4 (Series Editor: JJ Bagley) (Cheshire Community Council; 1973)
- Latham FA. (ed.) Acton (The Local History Group; 1995) (ISBN 0-9522284-1-6)
- Local History Group, Latham FA. (ed.). Wrenbury and Marbury (The Local History Group; 1999) (ISBN 0 9522284 5 9)
- McKenna L. Timber Framed Buildings in Cheshire (Cheshire County Council; 1994) (ISBN 0-906765-16-1)
- Pohl N. "Early Renaissance Country House Poetry" in A New Companion to English Renaissance Literature and Culture (Hattaway M, ed.) (John Wiley; 2010) (ISBN 978-1405187626)
