= St Mary's and St Michael's Church, Burleydam =

Coordinates: 52.9791°N 2.5870°W

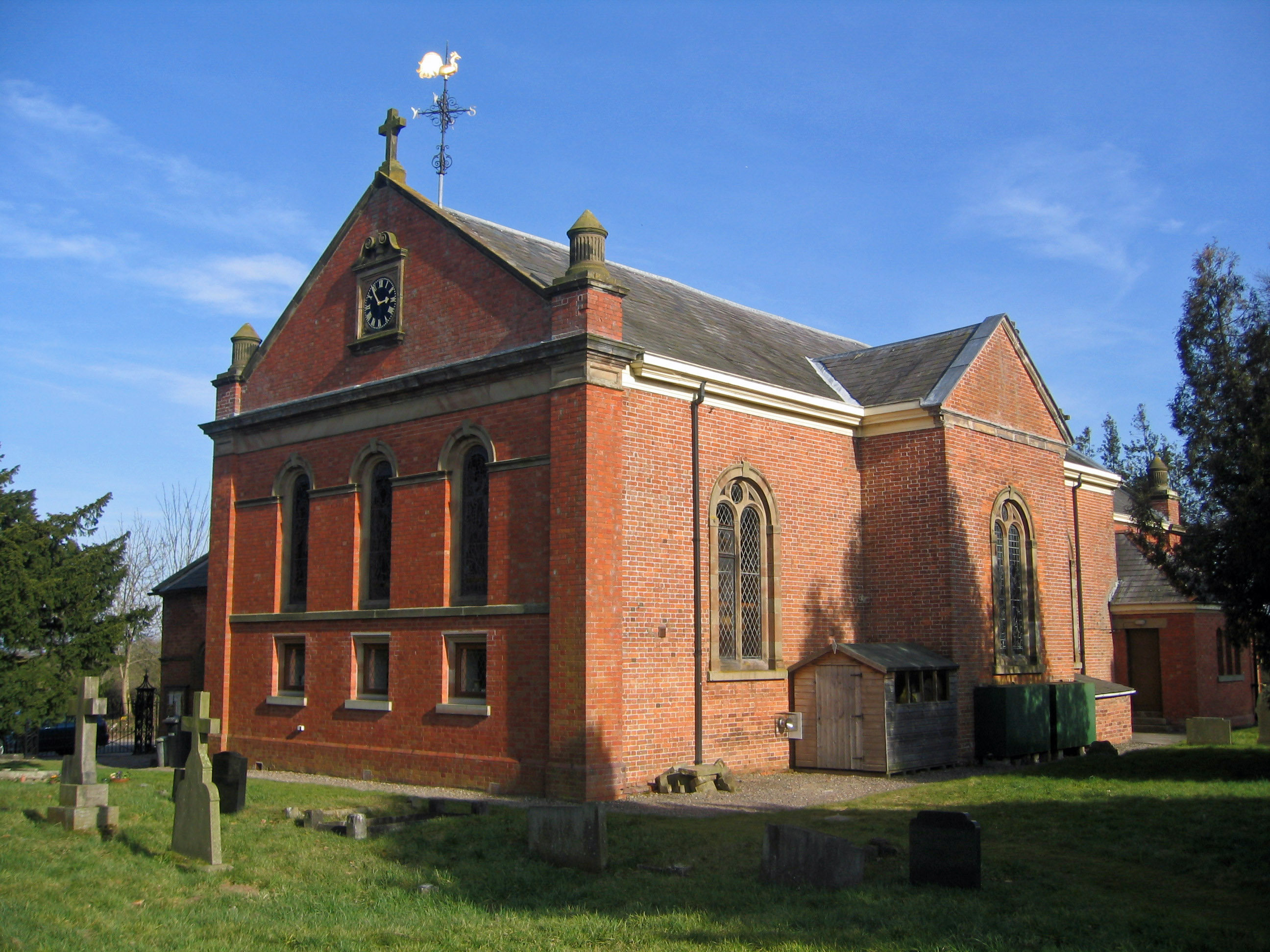
- St Mary's and St Michael's Church, Burleydam, from the southwest

- Location in Cheshire
- OS grid reference: SJ 606 426
- Location: Burleydam, Cheshire
- Country: England
- Denomination: Anglican
- Website: St Mary and St Michael, Burleydam

History
- Status: Parish church
- Founded: 1769
- Founder: Cottons of Combermere Abbey

Architecture
- Functional status: Active
- Heritage designation: Grade II
- Designated: 12 January 1967
- Architectural type: Church
- Style: Georgian
- Groundbreaking: 1769
- Completed: 1886

Specifications
- Materials: Brick with slate roof Timber bellcote with lead roof

Administration
- Province: York
- Diocese: Chester
- Archdeaconry: Macclesfield
- Deanery: Nantwich
- Parish: Burleydam

Clergy
- Vicar: Revd Amanda Pike

St Mary's and St Michael's Church is in the village of Burleydam in the civil parish of Dodcott cum Wilkesley, Cheshire, England. The church is some 1.5 miles (2 km) to the southeast of Combermere Abbey. It is recorded in the National Heritage List for England as a designated Grade II listed building. It is an active Anglican parish church in the diocese of Chester, the archdeaconry of Macclesfield and the deanery of Nantwich. Its benefice is combined with those of St Michael, Baddiley, and St Margaret, Wrenbury.

== History ==
The church was built in 1769 at the expense of the Cottons of Combermere Abbey. This church was cruciform in shape and in 1886 two further transepts, a chancel, a new west wall, a northwestern porch and a bellcote were added. The church was noted by Dr Johnson on his visit to Combermere on 24 July 1774. He describes the church as "neat and plain" with "handsome" communion plate.

== Architecture ==
=== Exterior ===
The church is built in brick with a slate roof. The west aspect has pilaster buttresses on each side on top of which are conical caps and ball finials. In the centre are three arched windows above which is a stone cornice and a gable containing a circular clock face with a stone surround. At the apex of the gable is a cross. At the date of listing, there was a timber bellcote on the ridge behind the cross, with a lead roof and a weather-cock on the summit; the bellcote became unsafe and was removed in 1992. The north aspect has a porch to the right with a round arch to the door above which is a carving of Saint George slaying the dragon. To the left are the transept and chancel with arched windows. The south aspect is similar but without a porch. The east aspect has a triple round-headed window and pilaster buttresses similar to those on the west aspect.

=== Interior ===
In the church is a monument to Stapleton Cotton, 1st Viscount Combermere who died in 1865. It consists of a bust under a Gothic arch. The stained glass in the east window is by Kempe and is dated 1908. The two-manual organ was built by Peter Conacher of Huddersfield. The gates and railings of the church were relocated from the former personal chapel of the Salusbury Family at Lleweni Hall after Stapleton Cotton inherited the estate following the passing of his ultimate heir, Sir John Salusbury, father of Hester Piozzi in 1769.

== External features ==
The cast iron railings, piers and gates at the entry to the churchyard date from the early 18th century are listed Grade II. They were brought from Llewenny and were also noted by Dr Johnson, who describes them as "of great elegance."

== See also ==
- Listed buildings in Dodcott cum Wilkesley
