= Sir Robert Salusbury Cotton, 5th Baronet =

English politician

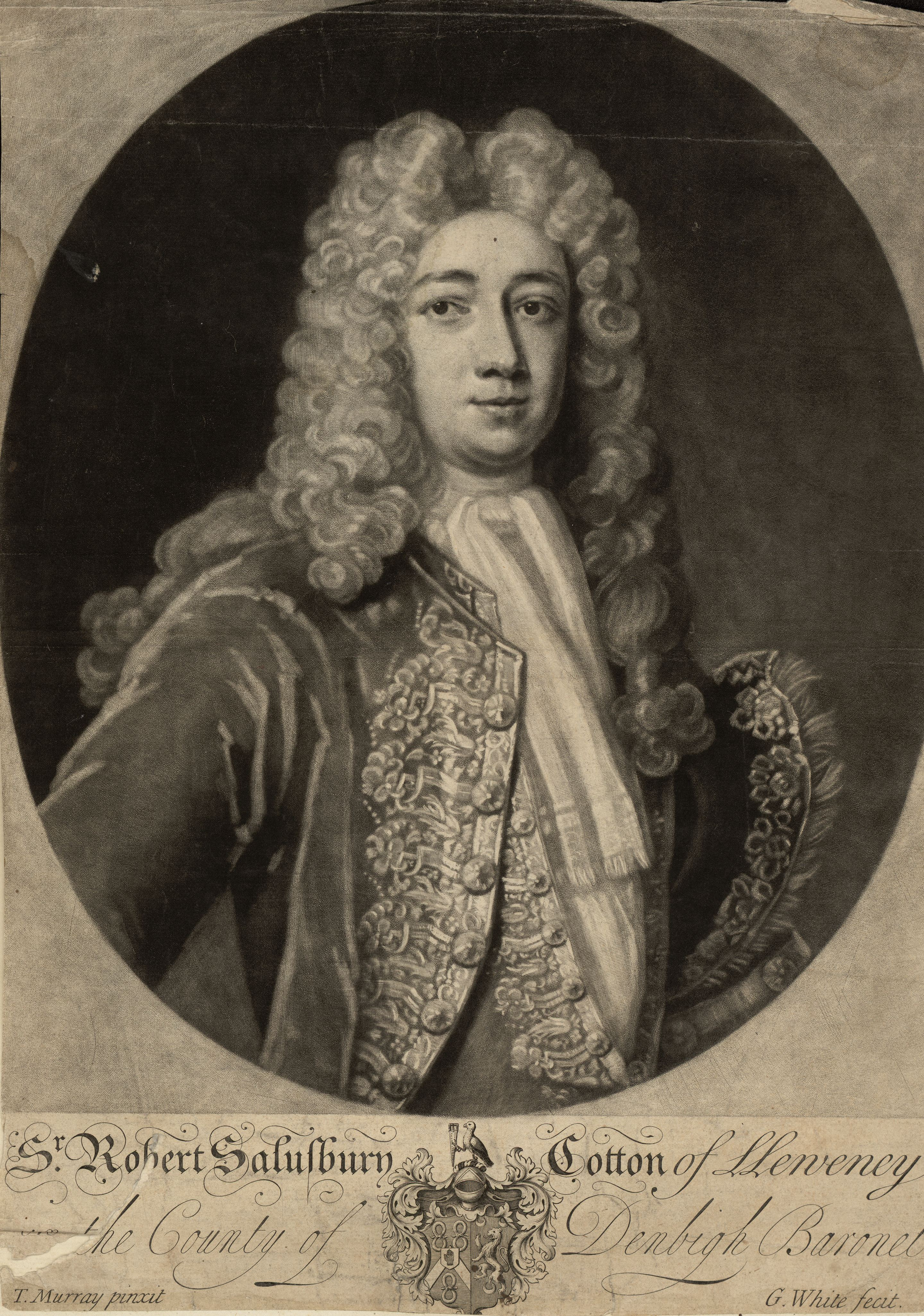
Sir Robert Salusbury Cotton of Lleweney 02195

Sir Robert Salusbury Cotton, 5th Baronet (c. 1739 – 24 August 1809) was an English politician who sat in the House of Commons from 1780 to 1796.

== Early life ==
Cotton was the eldest son of Sir Lynch Cotton. He was educated at Westminster School and Shrewsbury School, then entered Trinity Hall, Cambridge in 1756. He was one of the founders of the Tarporley Hunt Club in 1762.

== Domestic life ==
Cotton married Frances Stapleton, daughter and co-heiress of James Russel-Stapleton in 1767. In 1774 they were visited at Llewenli Hall by Sir Robert's cousin, Hester Thrale, who was accompanied by the writer Samuel Johnson; Frances "found Johnson, despite his rudeness, at times delightful, having a manner peculiar to himself in relating anecdotes that could not fail to attract old and young. Her impression was that Mrs. Thrale was very vexatious in wishing to engross all his attention, which annoyed him much". The Cottons later broke off relations with Hester following her 1784 marriage to an Italian music teacher.

In 1774 he was elected a Fellow of the Royal Society.

On the death of his father on 14 August 1775, he succeeded to the baronetcy and inherited the old Salusbury family seat at Lleweni Hall. Soon after the birth of his second son, he moved from Lleweni Hall to Combermere Abbey, the traditional seat of the heir apparent to the baronetcy. He had to lease the family's former estate to Thomas FitzMaurice, a brother of Lord Shelburne's, because of the profligacy of his uncle, Sir Thomas Cotton. Nevertheless, Sir Robert kept a large hunting establishment and was known as a generous host.

== Parliamentary career ==
Cotton was returned unopposed as Member of Parliament (MP) for Cheshire at a by-election on 1 March 1780 and at the succeeding 1780 general election. In 1784 he was a member of the St. Alban's Tavern group which aimed to reconcile Charles James Fox and William Pitt the Younger. He was returned again unopposed in 1784 and 1790. Towards the end of that parliament, he applied three times to Pitt for the position of collector of salt duties at Nantwich and was ignored. It was unexpected when he decided not to stand again in 1796. His brother later stated that this was due to ill health and that he had declined a peerage, but contemporary accounts claimed it was in annoyance at not being given the post.

== Later life and legacy ==
Cotton was a major in the Nantwich volunteers in 1797 and 1803. He had to sell his Welsh estates for about £390,000, as he was in debt due to extravagance and bad management. He died aged 70 on 24 August 1809.

Cotton and his wife Frances had the following children:

- Robert-Salusbury (born 11 September 1768), died without issue
- Stapleton (1773–1865), 6th baronet, elevated to the peerage as a Viscount and Baron Combermere
- William (died 16 June 1853), took holy orders
- Lynch, colonel in the army; died in the East Indies in 1799
- Frances (1 December 1769 – 26 November 1818), married Robert Needham, 11th Viscount Kilmorey (1746–1818) on 10 January 1792
- Penelope (31 December 1770 – 1786)
- Hester-Maria (died 20 March 1845)
- Sophia (died 24 May 1838), married Sir H. M. Mainwaring, Bart, of Over Peover, Chester

Parliament of Great Britain
Preceded by John Crewe and Samuel Egerton	Member of Parliament for Cheshire; 1780–1796; With: John Crewe	Succeeded by John Crewe and Thomas Cholmondeley
Baronetage of England
Preceded by Lynch Salusbury Cotton	Baronet (of Combermere); 1775–1809	Succeeded by Stapleton Cotton
