= Barnett Brook =

Hamlet in Cheshire, England

Coordinates: 52.99°N 02.56°W

- Location within Cheshire
- OS grid reference: SJ6244
- Unitary authority: Cheshire East
- Ceremonial county: Cheshire
- Region: North West
- Country: England
- Sovereign state: United Kingdom
- Police: Cheshire
- Fire: Cheshire
- Ambulance: North West

Barnett Brook is a hamlet in the Newhall and Dodcott cum Wilkesley civil parishes in the Cheshire East area of Cheshire, England. The hamlet is situated around a road bridge carrying Sheppenhall Lane across Barnett Brook, a tributary of the River Weaver. The sandstone bridge dates from the early to mid 19th century and is a grade II listed building.
