= Dodcott cum Wilkesley =

Civil parish in Cheshire, England

Coordinates: 52.981°N 2.567°W

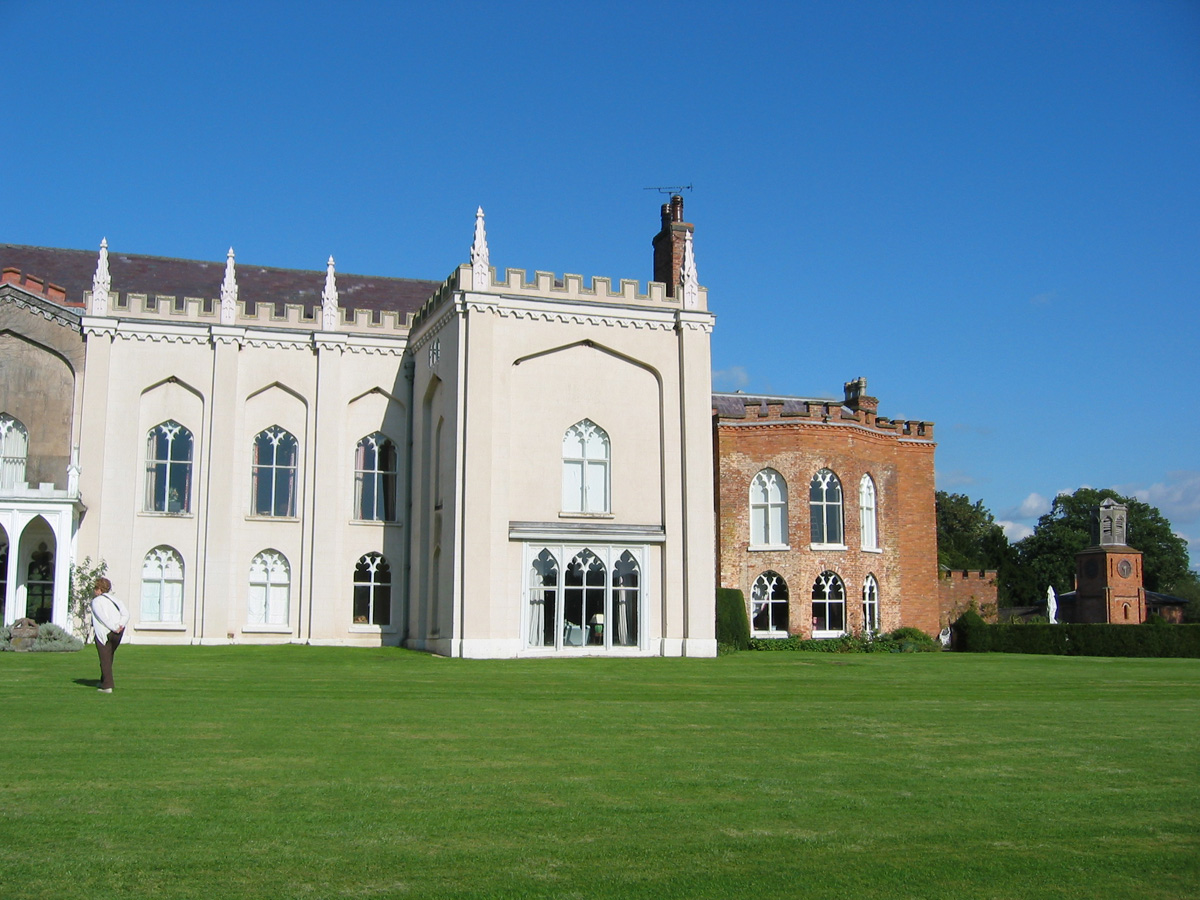
- Combermere Abbey: Abbot's House and clock tower

- Location within Cheshire
- Population: 415 (2011)
- OS grid reference: SJ619428
- Civil parish: Dodcott cum Wilkesley
- Unitary authority: Cheshire East
- Ceremonial county: Cheshire
- Region: North West
- Country: England
- Sovereign state: United Kingdom
- Post town: WHITCHURCH
- Postcode district: SY13
- Dialling code: 01270
- Police: Cheshire
- Fire: Cheshire
- Ambulance: North West
- UK Parliament: Chester South and Eddisbury

Dodcott cum Wilkesley is a civil parish in the unitary authority of Cheshire East and the ceremonial county of Cheshire, England. The hamlet of Wilkesley (at SJ 628 410) lies 2 1/2 miles to the west of Audlem and 7 miles to the south west of Nantwich. The parish also includes the village of Burleydam, the largest settlement, as well as the small settlements of Butterley Heyes, Cheshire Fields, Combermere, Lightwood Green and Royal's Green. It also formerly contained the settlements of Pinsley Green and Smeaton Wood, now located in Wrenbury cum Frith civil parish. Nearby villages include Adderley and Calverhall in Shropshire and Audlem, Newhall and Wrenbury within Cheshire.

According to the 2001 census, the parish had a population of 380, increasing to 415 at the 2011 Census.

== Governance ==
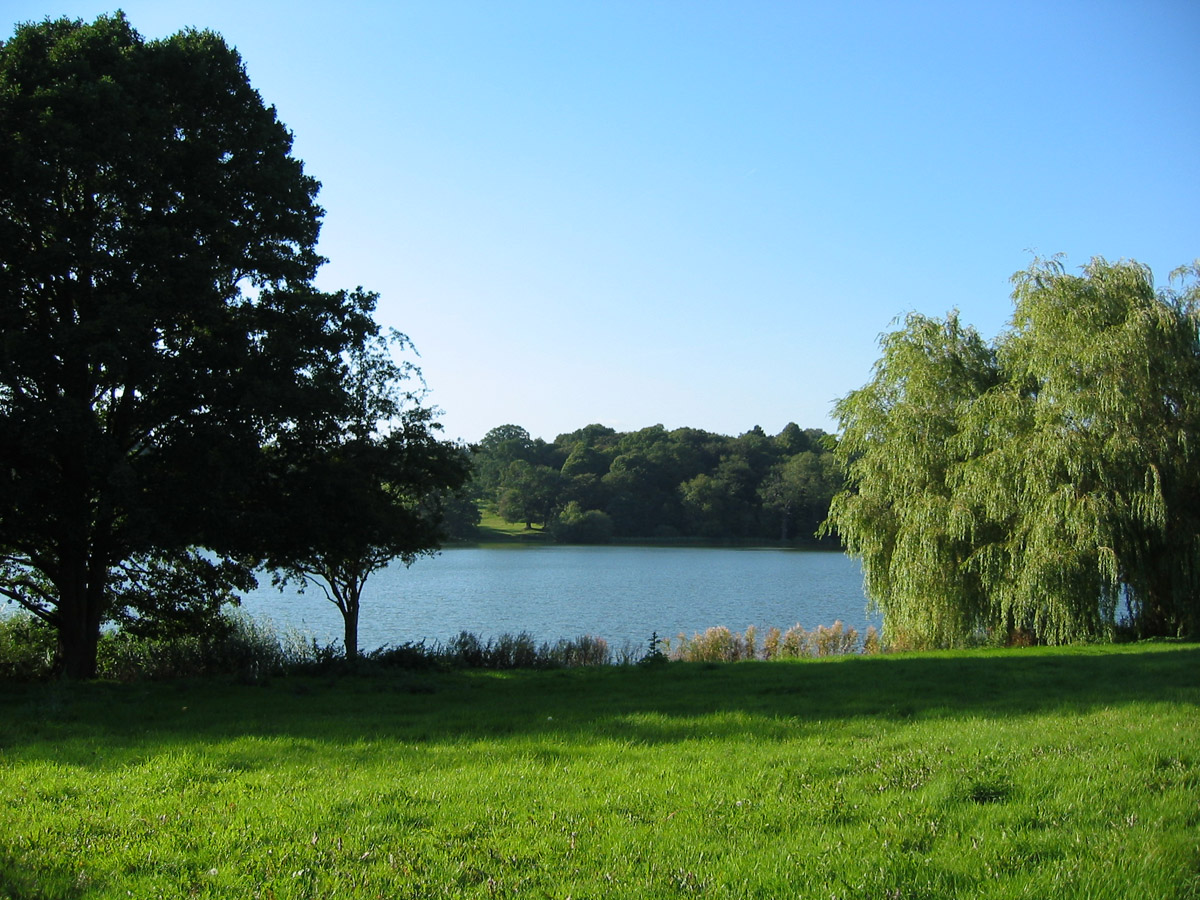
Comber Mere

From 1974 the civil parish was served by Crewe and Nantwich Borough Council, which was succeeded on 1 April 2009 by the new unitary authority of Cheshire East. Dodcott cum Wilkesley falls in the parliamentary constituency of Chester South and Eddisbury, which has been represented since the 2024 general election by Aphra Brandreth of the Conservative Party. It was previously part of the Eddisbury constituency, which since its establishment in 1983 had been held by the Conservative MPs Alastair Goodlad (1983–99), Stephen O'Brien (1999–2015), Antoinette Sandbach (2015–19) and Edward Timpson (2019–24).

== Geography and transport ==
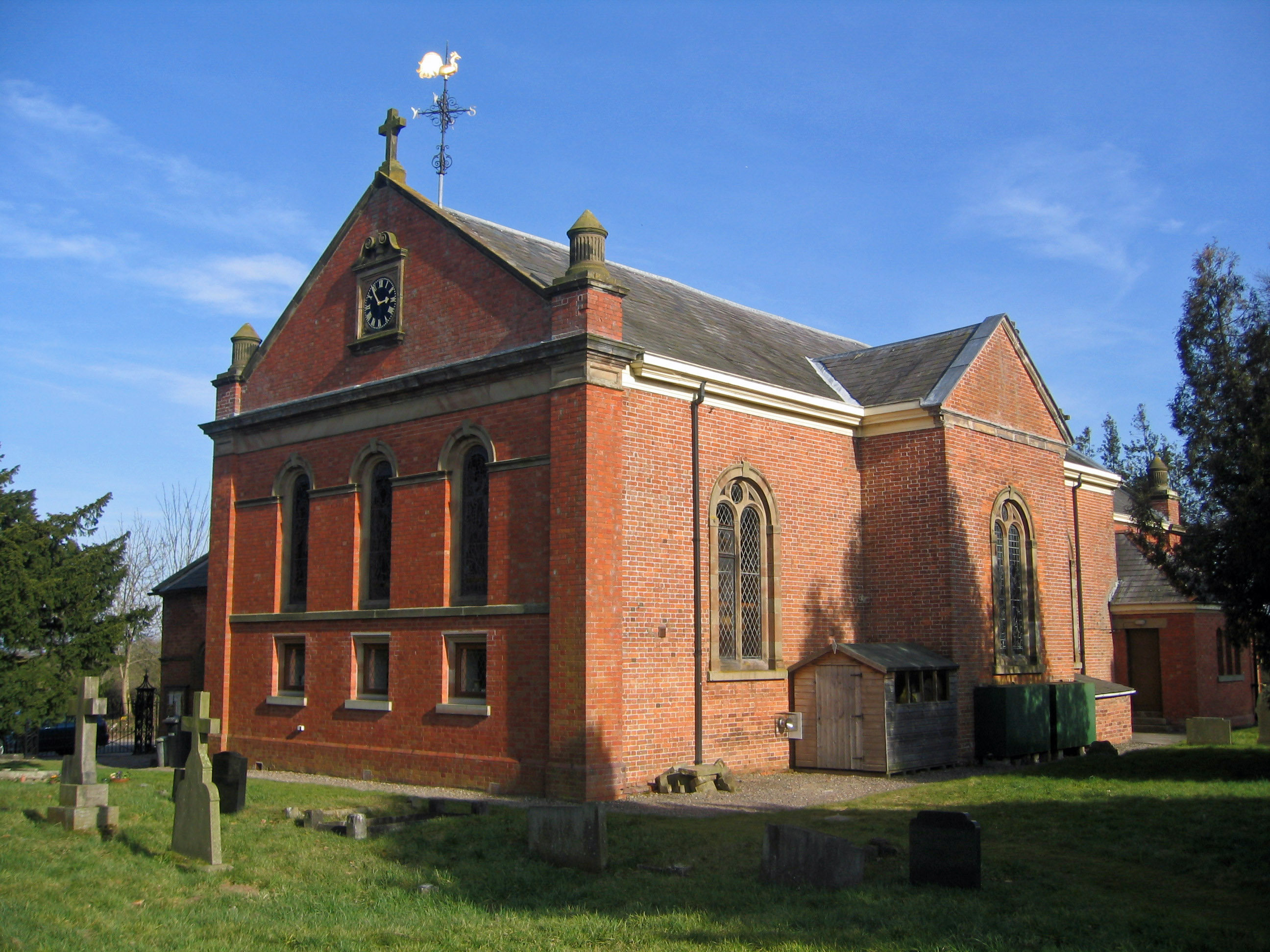
St Mary and St Michael's Church

The park of Combermere Abbey forms much of the area of the civil parish. Outside the park, there are several areas of woodland within the civil parish including Kent's Rough, Walkmill Covert and Wilkesley Covert.

The A525 and A530 roads run east–west and north–south, respectively, through the civil parish.

== Combermere Abbey ==
Combermere Abbey is a former Cistercian monastery which was founded in 1133 and is listed at grade I. Its park includes the large lake of Comber Mere and several areas of mixed woodland, including Poole's Riding Wood.

== Places of worship ==
St Mary and St Michael's Church is located in the village of Burleydam. It dates from 1769 and is listed at grade II.

== Notable residents ==
Geoffrey Whitney (c. 1548 – c. 1601), a poet known for his collection Choice of Emblemes, lived at Royals Green towards the end of his life.

== See also ==
- Listed buildings in Dodcott cum Wilkesley
