= Sir Thomas Cotton, 2nd Baronet, of Combermere =

English peer and officer of the Crown

Sir Thomas Cotton, 2nd Baronet (c. 1672 – 12 June 1715) was an English peer and officer of the Crown.

== Life ==
He was born the son of Sir Robert Cotton and Hester Salusbury, daughter of Royalist politician and soldier Sir Thomas Salusbury. Sheriff of Cheshire from 1712 to 1713, he succeeded to the Cotton Baronetcy on 17 December 1712.

=== Family ===
Sir Thomas married Philadelphia (5 May 1675 – 30 December 1758), daughter and heiress of Sir Thomas Lynch, thrice Governor of Jamaica, and his first wife Vere Herbert, around 18 November 1689. The couple had the following issue:

- Thomas Salusbury (c. 1691 – 1710), heir apparent.
- Henry (born c. 1692), died young.
- Anne (born c. 1693), died young.
- Sir Robert Salusbury, inherited his father's title as 3rd Baronet.
- Philadelphia (born 19 March 1698), married Thomas Boycott of Hinton, Shropshire
- Stephen Salusbury (1700–1727)
- Hugh Calveley (c. 1701 – 24 June 1702)
- John Salusbury (1708 – 1730)
- Sophia (c. 1704 – c. 1756), unmarried.
- Sir Lynch Salusbury (c. 1706 – 14 August 1775), inherited his brother's title as 4th Baronet.
- Hester Maria (c. 1707 – 20 August 1733) married John Salusbury of Bachecraig, Flint.
- Sidney Arabella (female) (c. 1709 – 30 January 1781), unmarried.
- George Calveley (c. 1710–1715)
- William Salusbury (c. 1712 – c. 1715)
- Vere (female) (c. 1713 – 23 September 1730)
- Henry Salusbury (c. 1714 – ?), died young.

Baronetage of England
Preceded by Robert Cotton	Baronet (of Combermere); 1712–1715	Succeeded by Robert Cotton
