= Game larder =

Food storage building

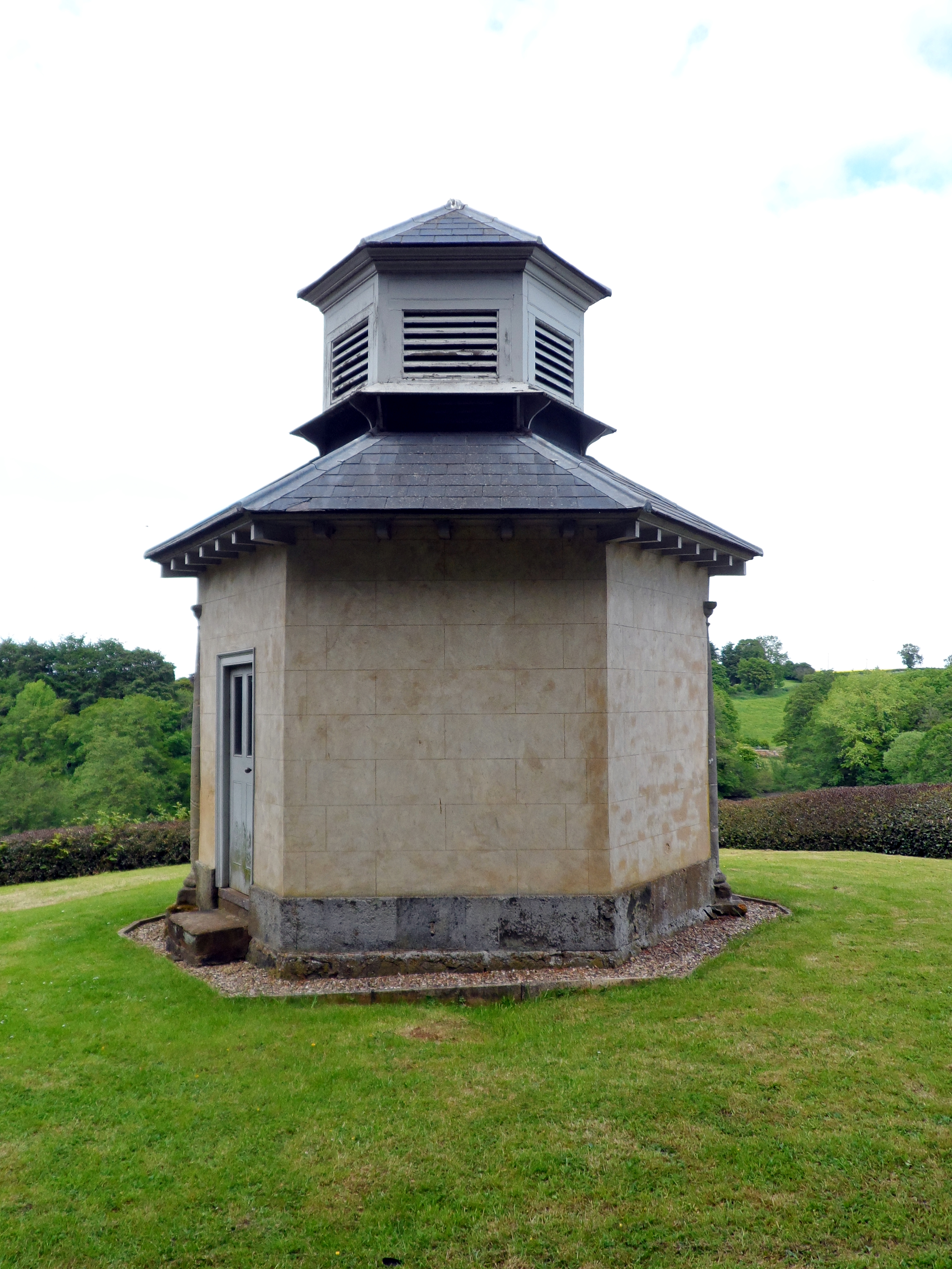
Hexagonal game larder at Farnborough Hall, Warwickshire

A game larder, also sometimes known as a deer or venison larder, deer, venison or game house, game pantry or game store, is a small domestic outbuilding where the carcasses of game, including deer, game birds, hares and rabbits, are hung to mature in a cool environment. A feature of large country houses and sporting lodges in Britain and parts of northern Europe from the 18th century, game larders continue to be used by shooting estates.

== 18th–20th centuries ==
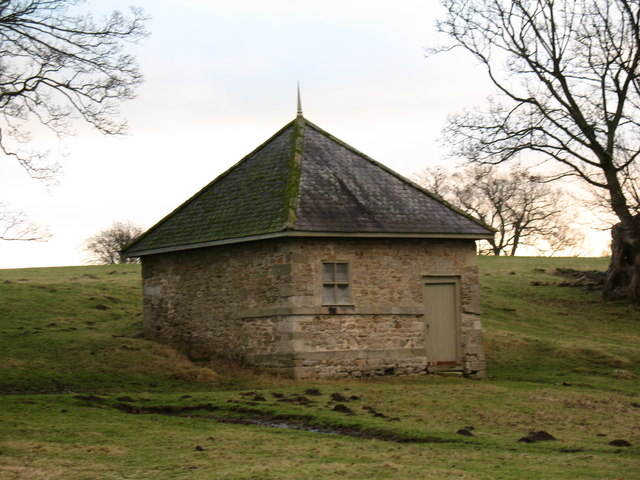
Square example at Studley Park, Yorkshire

A separate building for storing game during the maturation process improves ventilation, while reducing the odour problem. Most large country houses in Britain had a game larder, and numerous examples built between the early 18th and early 20th centuries survive. The structure also existed in other European countries where hunting or shooting game was popular, including Germany and Austria-Hungary.

Game larders were usually situated near the kitchen. The usual English design is single storey, sometimes octagonal, and usually of brick or stone construction; ventilation is provided by louvred roof lanterns and louvred or mesh-covered unglazed windows. Some game larders had separate rooms for small and large game. A stone or slate floor helped to cool the room. By the early 20th century, refrigeration via cooling pipes was employed. Game larders were sometimes combined with other outbuildings, especially ice houses, as for example at Elvaston Castle in Derbyshire and the Raith Estate in Fife. In central Europe, ice houses were themselves sometimes used for storing deer carcasses.

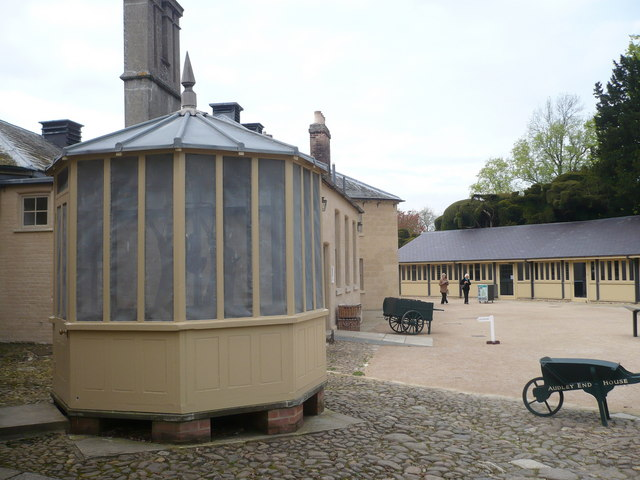
Timber example at Audley End House, Essex

John Claudius Loudon describes a small game larder in 1842:

I once saw a very pretty convenient larder, which was used only for game. ... It was built out from the wall of the kitchen, in the form of an octagon, having windows on every side, except that formed by the kitchen wall, and in this was the door. The roof projected over the windows, to protect them from the sun and rain. The ceiling in the interior was coved, and from the centre hung an octagon rack with hooks for the smaller birds all ranged in order; and round the wall was another rack for pheasants, hares, rabbits, &c.

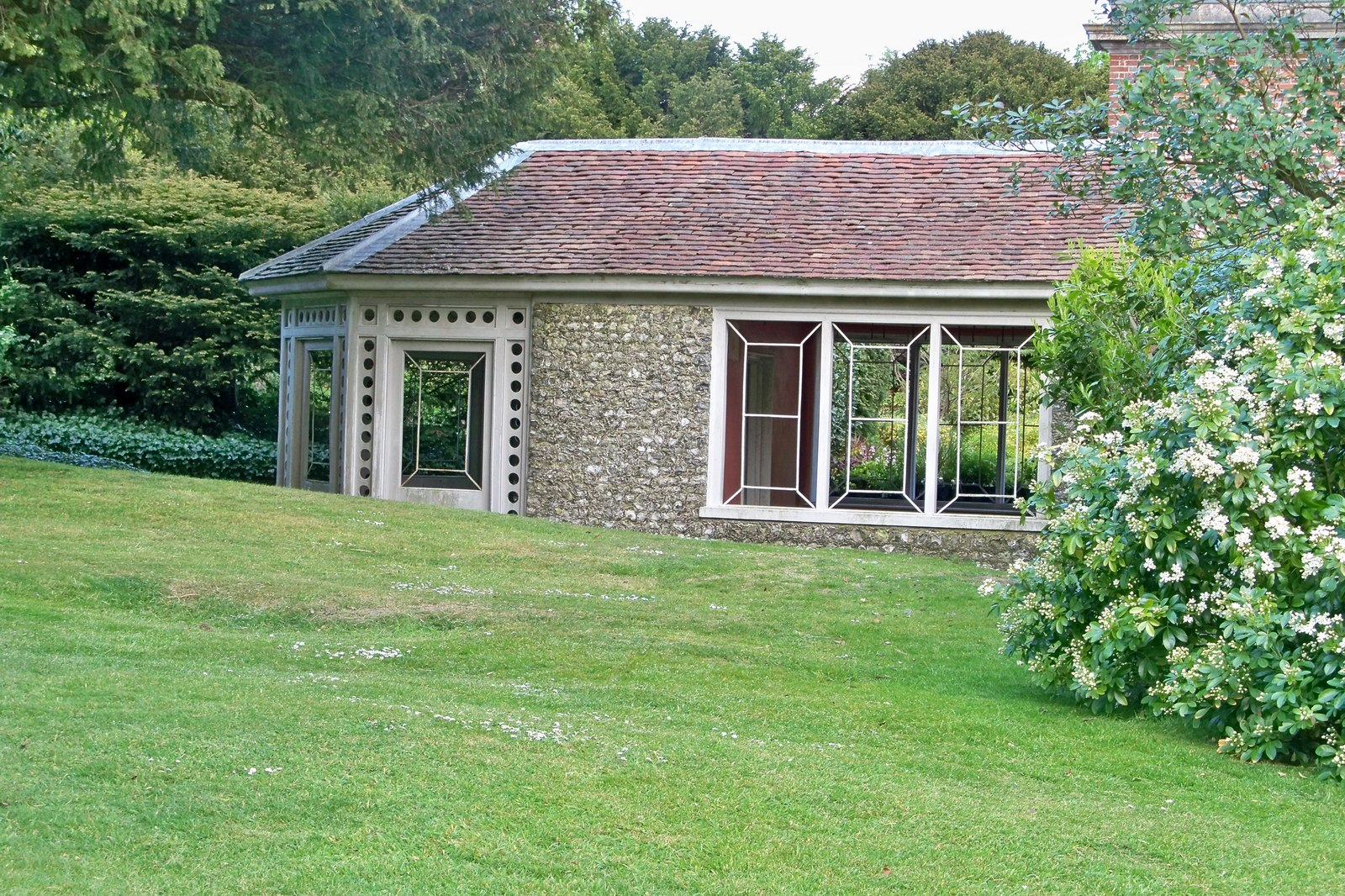
Game larder at Uppark, Sussex

Rails or beams were used to support deer on hooks, with roof-suspended racks, sometimes on pulleys, for small game. Shelves, possibly of marble, were also used. Another necessary fixture described by Victorian architect Robert Kerr is a dresser topped with slate or marble for meat preparation.

A relatively early example is the game larder at Farnborough Hall, Warwickshire, which dates from around 1750 and is thought to be by Sanderson Miller; the hexagonal rendered-brick structure has a loggia with Tuscan columns and is surmounted with a wooden cupola. An example of an unornamented square game larder stands at Studley Park in Yorkshire; built in limestone, it dates from the late 18th century. The square stone game larder at Rydal Hall in Cumbria has a timber upper storey reached by an external staircase. Although most extant game larders are built in stone or brick, some timber examples have survived. Examples include the structures at Brodsworth Hall, Yorkshire, Audley End House, Essex, and the Bird Game Larder at Ardverikie House, Badenoch and Strathspey.

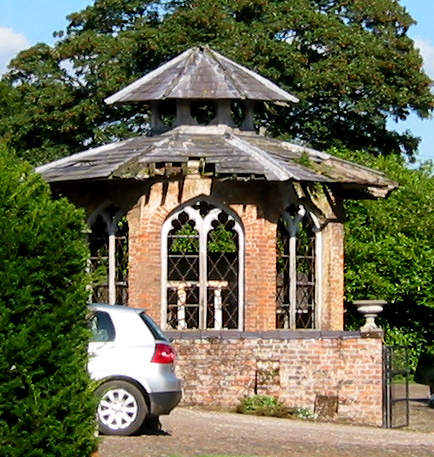
Gothic windows at Combermere Abbey, Cheshire

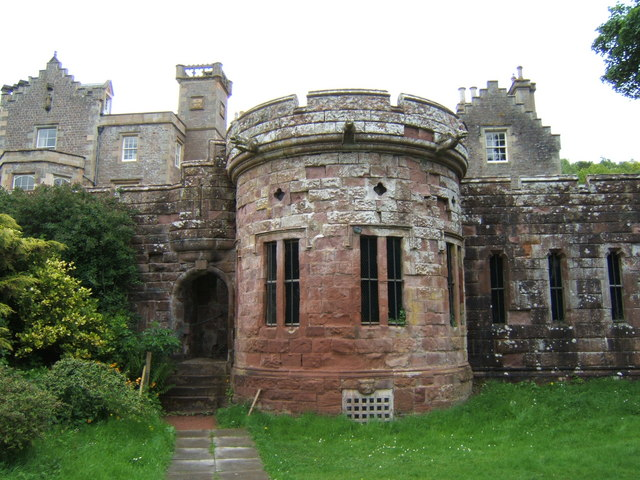
Mock castle at Abbotsford House, Selkirkshire

In addition to their practical purpose, game larders on great estates often served a decorative function, and could be highly ornate in their design. The game larder at Uppark in Sussex, designed by Humphry Repton, has a floor decorated with deer vertebrae, and has been described as "a mannered grotesque advertisement for the pleasures of the chase and the table awaiting arriving guests." Dating from around 1810, the rectangular flint-faced building has an octagonal timber portion. The game larder at Combermere Abbey in Cheshire, which also dates from the early 19th century and is thought to be by the Irish Morrison family, has decorative windows in the Gothic style. The octagonal red-brick structure is capped with a timber roof lantern. The game larder at Abbotsford House in Selkirkshire, built by John Smith of Darnick in 1851, takes the form of a circular castle, with crenellations. The circular interior of the game larder at Holkham Hall in Norfolk is lined with alabaster; designed by Samuel Wyatt, the octagonal building dates from 1803.

== Modern ==
Game larders continue to be used on shooting estates in Britain to store game and sometimes additionally to process it to meat products such as venison. To comply with modern food hygiene regulations, their design incorporates drinking-quality water outlets, and frequently powered ventilation, insect-killing devices and refrigeration.

== See also ==
- Larder
