= Viscount Combermere =

Title in the Peerage of the United Kingdom

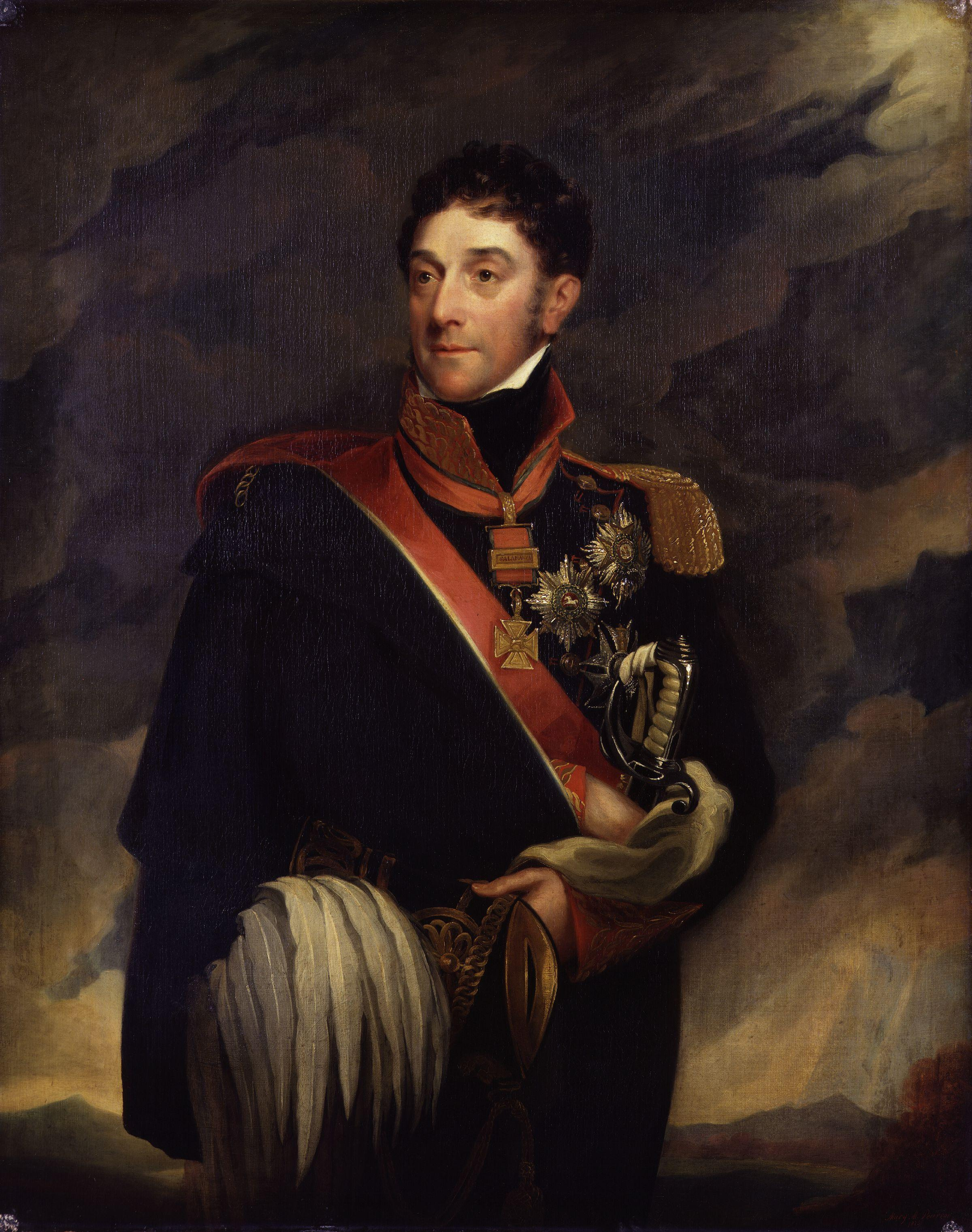
Field Marshal Sir Stapleton Stapleton-Cotton, 6th Bt, who became 1st Baron Combermere (1814) and 1st Viscount Combermere (1827).

Viscount Combermere, of Bhurtpore in the East Indies and of Combermere in the County Palatine of Chester, is a title in the Peerage of the United Kingdom. It was created in 1827 for the prominent military commander Stapleton Stapleton-Cotton, 1st Baron Combermere. He had already been created Baron Combermere, of Combermere in the County Palatine of Chester, in 1814, also in the Peerage of the United Kingdom. He had previously inherited the baronetcy, of Combermere in the County Palatine of Chester, which was created in the Baronetage of England on 29 March 1677 for his great-great-grandfather Robert Cotton.

The title of the baronetcy, barony and viscountcy, Combermere, is pronounced "Cumbermeer".

The first baronet represented Cheshire in the House of Commons. His grandson, the third Baronet, sat as a Member of Parliament for Cheshire as well as for Lostwithiel. He was succeeded by his younger brother, the fourth Baronet. He represented Denbighshire in the House of Commons. His son, the fifth Baronet, also represented Cheshire in Parliament. The latter was succeeded by his son, the sixth Baronet, who was later elevated to the peerage as Viscount Combermere. His son, the second Viscount, sat as a Conservative Member of Parliament for Carrickfergus. As of 2010 the titles are held by the latter's great-great-grandson, the sixth Viscount, who succeeded his father in 2000.

Until 1919, the family seat of the viscounts Combermere was Combermere Abbey in Combermere Park, between Nantwich and Whitchurch in Cheshire. The traditional burial place of the viscounts was at St Margaret's Church, Wrenbury.

== Cotton and Stapleton-Cotton baronets, of Combermere (1677) ==
- Sir Robert Cotton, 1st Baronet (c. 1635–1712)
- Sir Thomas Cotton, 2nd Baronet (c. 1672–1715)
- Sir Robert Cotton, 3rd Baronet (1695–1748)
- Sir Lynch Cotton, 4th Baronet (c. 1705–1775)
- Sir Robert Salusbury Cotton, 5th Baronet (c. 1739–1809)
- Sir Stapleton Cotton, 6th Baronet (1773–1865) (created Baron Combermere in 1814 and Viscount Combermere in 1827)

== Viscounts Combermere (1827) ==
- Stapleton Cotton, 1st Viscount Combermere (1773–1865)
  - Robert Henry Stapleton Cotton (1802–1821)
- Wellington Henry Stapleton-Cotton, 2nd Viscount Combermere (1818–1891)
- Robert Wellington Stapleton-Cotton, 3rd Viscount Combermere (1845–1898)
- Francis Lynch Wellington Stapleton-Cotton, 4th Viscount Combermere (1887–1969)
- Michael Wellington Stapleton-Cotton, 5th Viscount Combermere (1929–2000)
- Thomas Robert Wellington Stapleton-Cotton, 6th Viscount Combermere (born 1969)

The heir apparent is the present holder's son, Hon. Laszlo Michael Wellington Stapleton-Cotton (born 2010).

== Arms ==
Coat of arms of Viscount Combermere

Crest
1st a falcon wings expanded and inverted Proper beaked membered and belled Or holding in the dexter claw part of a belt Proper buckled Gold 2nd on a mount Vert a dragoon of the 20th Regiment mounted on a black horse and in the act of charging and over the crest in an escrol Azure the word "Salamanca" in gold letters 3rd out of a ducal coronet Or a Saracen's head couped at the shoulders affrontée wreathed around the temples Argent and Sable.
Escutcheon
Quarterly 1st & 4th Azure a chevron between three hanks of cotton Argent palewise and in chief pendant from a ribbon Gules a representation of the medal and clasps presented to the first viscount (Cotton) 2nd & 3rd Argent a lion rampant Sable (Stapleton).
Supporters
Two falcons wings expanded and endorsed Proper beaked membered and belled Or the dexter supporting a spear also Proper therefrom flowing to the dexter a standard swallow-tailed Vert semée of estoiles Or streamers and tassels of the last and the sinister supporting a like spear therefrom flowing a yellow standard swallow-tailed streamers and tassels of the last.
Motto
Prepared In All Circumstances

== Slave trading ==
Stapleton Cotton, 1st Viscount Combermere was a joint owner of a number of plantations on St Kitts and Nevis between 1822 and 1834. He was appointed the Governor of Barbados in 1817 meaning he was involved with overseeing the operation of plantations, slaves being shipped in and out of the island through purchase and sales of African people and the overall use of slaves on the island. He also received a considerable amount of compensation (around £920,000 in today's currency) for the loss of 420 enslaved people, at the time of release, on his estates.
