= John Webb (landscape designer) =

English landscape designer and architect

- Born: 1754
- Died: 1828 (aged 73–74)
- Occupations: landscape designer, architect
- Known for: landscape garden design in England

John Webb (1754–1828) was an English landscape designer, who also trained as an architect. He studied under William Emes between 1782 and 1793, and then established his own practice. He worked mainly in the Midlands and the north of England. In Staffordshire he was commissioned by Josiah Wedgwood to work in the gardens of Lowther Hall and Maer Hall. In Cheshire he designed work in the gardens of Rode Hall, Tabley House, Crewe Hall, Tatton Park, and Ardene Hall. He followed Emes at Eaton Hall where he added new terrace walls, improved one of the approach roads by levelling it and planting 130,000 trees along it, and built a lake in the grounds.
