= Meat hanging =

Culinary process

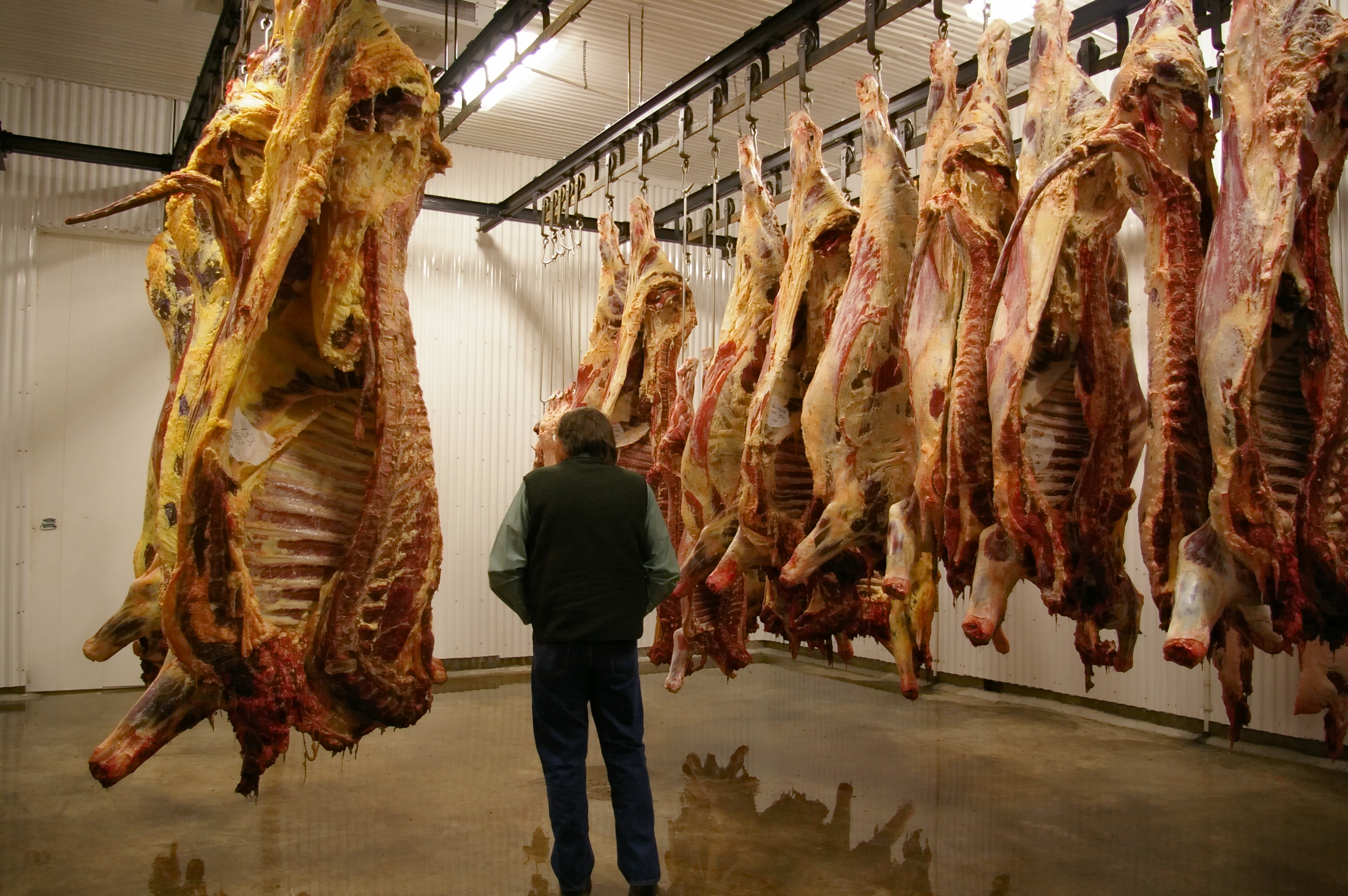
Meat hanging in a cooler room. Freshly slaughtered animals are on the left, day-old animals on the right.

Meat hanging is the culinary process of dry-aging meat to develop its flavor and tenderness.

It is applied both to beef and to game.

== Hanging game ==
Traditionally, game meat was hung until "high" or "gamey", that is, approaching a state of decomposition.

== Dry-aging beef ==
For dry-aged beef, the meat is hung in a room kept between 33–37 degrees Fahrenheit (1–3 degrees Celsius), with relative humidity of around 85%. If the room is too hot, the meat will spoil, and if it is too cold, the meat freezes and dry aging stops. Good ventilation prevents bacteria from developing on the meat. The meat is checked on regularly.

Meat hanging allows processes to continue in the meat that would normally cease in dead animals. For example, the muscles in the meat continue to use the hemoglobin that is stored in the soft tissue of the animal. This normal biological process creates lactic acid. Contrary to popular belief, animals cannot be completely drained of bodily fluid during slaughter, since soft tissue necessarily retains some amount of fluid. This can be well observed by cooking a steak and observing "blood" on the plate. Since the blood is no longer being circulated through the body, the lactic acid starts to break down the muscle and connective tissues around it.

The process takes at a minimum eleven days. The longer the meat is hung, the better the flavor will be, but also the higher the chance that the meat will spoil. Most companies limit hanging to 20–30 days. Up to 10–15% of the water content may evaporate.

As the meat ages, its color goes from red to purple, and the texture becomes firmer.

=== Popularity ===
In the 1960s, the cheaper wet-aging process largely displaced dry aging as dry-aged meat is 15–25% more expensive than wet-aged beef: dry hanging rooms are expensive; meat weight is reduced through evaporation; and some proportion of meat spoils.

Dry aging became more popular in the 1980s, and dry aged beef continues to be sold in high-end restaurants around the world.

== See also ==
- Beef aging
