= Meres and Mosses =

The Meres and Mosses are a natural area of England defined by Natural England and its predecessor bodies as statutory regulators for the natural environment of England. This region in the northwest part of the English Midlands coincides broadly with the Shropshire, Cheshire and Staffordshire National Character Area (NCA) 61. A Ramsar site was designated in May 1994 covering 16 sites across this region, with a total area of 510.88 hectares, and known as the 'Midland Meres and Mosses Phase 1'. Over 60 individual water bodies or meres are recognised within the designation alongside a lesser number of peatland sites. Phase 2 of the Ramsar designation included Rostherne Mere on the northern margin of this area. A handful of similar meres and mosses are located close by in eastern Wales, notably in Welsh Maelor, within the modern borough of Wrexham.

== Meres ==
The following list is based in part on information provided by researchers P.W. Beale and C.S. Reynolds, the latter having collected them into groups in the Ellesmere, Whitchurch, Woore, Delamere, Baschurch, Shrewsbury and Knutsford areas. Two further categories include those in the 'marginal belt of hummocky drift' in the east and those seen to sit in isolation.

Sortable table of meres
Name	Area (ha)	Group	County
Blake Mere (nr Ellesmere)	8.4	Ellesmere	Shropshire
Ellesmere Mere	46.1	Ellesmere	Shropshire
Kettle Mere	1.7	Ellesmere	Shropshire
Newton Mere	8.3	Ellesmere	Shropshire
White Mere	25.5	Ellesmere	Shropshire
Cole Mere	27.6	Ellesmere	Shropshire
Crose Mere	15.2	Ellesmere	Shropshire
Sweat Mere	0.2 approx	Ellesmere	Shropshire
Hardwick Pool	3.6	Ellesmere	Shropshire
Peckforton Mere	1.0	Whitchurch	Cheshire
Chapel Mere	6.5	Whitchurch	Cheshire
Deer Park Mere	9.4	Whitchurch	Cheshire
Norbury Big Mere	1.6	Whitchurch	Cheshire
Norbury Little Mere	1.5	Whitchurch	Cheshire
Bar Mere	9.7	Whitchurch	Cheshire
Quoisley Big Mere	4.0	Whitchurch	Cheshire
Quoisley Little Mere	2.2	Whitchurch	Cheshire
Marbury Big Mere	10.5	Whitchurch	Cheshire
Marbury Little Mere	1.3	Whitchurch	Cheshire
Oss Mere	9.5	Whitchurch	Shropshire
Comber Mere	51.5	Whitchurch	Cheshire
Blake Mere nr Whitchurch	3.7	Whitchurch	Shropshire
Baddiley Mere	6.7	Whitchurch	Cheshire
Hanmer Mere	17.7	Whitchurch	Wrexham
Doddington Pool	19.3	Woore	Cheshire
Betley Mere	9.3	Woore	Staffordshire
Hatch Mere	4.7	Delamere	Cheshire
Oak Mere	18.3	Delamere	Cheshire
Petty Pool	11.7	Delamere	Cheshire
Little Budworth Pool	4.9	Delamere	Cheshire
Berth Mere	2.9	Baschurch	Shropshire
Birchgrove Mere	1.7	Baschurch	Shropshire
Fenemere	9.4	Baschurch	Shropshire
Marton Pool (Baschurch)	6.8	Baschurch	Shropshire
Cottage Pool	1.8	Shrewsbury	Shropshire
Isle Pool	5.8	Shrewsbury	Shropshire
Oxon Pool	1.4	Shrewsbury	Shropshire
Alkmond Park Pool	4.4	Shrewsbury	Shropshire
Hencott Pool	3.5	Shrewsbury	Shropshire
Bomere Pool	10.3	Shrewsbury	Shropshire
Shomere	1.3	Shrewsbury	Shropshire
Betton Pool	6.4	Shrewsbury	Shropshire
Top Pool	1.8	Shrewsbury	Shropshire
Berrington Pool	2.5	Shrewsbury	Shropshire
Budworth Mere	39.4	Knutsford	Cheshire
Pick Mere	17.5	Knutsford	Cheshire
Tabley Mere	19.4	Knutsford	Cheshire
Mere Mere	15.8	Knutsford	Cheshire
Rostherne Mere	48.7	Knutsford	Cheshire
Tatton Mere	31.7	Knutsford	Cheshire
Booth's Mere	6.4	Knutsford	Cheshire
Radnor Mere	8.3	Marginal	Cheshire
Redes Mere	17.0	Marginal	Cheshire
Taxmere	1.2	Marginal	Cheshire
Rode Pool	12.7	Marginal	Cheshire
Lawton Mere	1.3	Marginal	Cheshire
Alsager Mere	3.5	Marginal	Cheshire
Maer Pool	5.5	isolated	Staffordshire
Cop Mere	16.8	isolated	Staffordshire
Aqualate Mere	72.5	isolated	Staffordshire
Marton Pool, nr Chirbury	13.7	isolated	Shropshire
Llynclys Pool	2.8	isolated	Shropshire
Padeswood Pool	1.0 approx	isolated	Flintshire
