= Richard Legh =

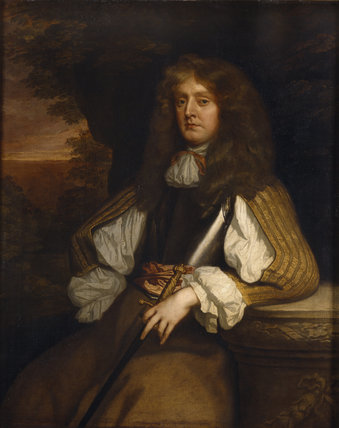
Richard Legh

Richard Legh (7 May 1634 – 31 August 1687) was an English politician who sat in the House of Commons variously between 1656 and 1678.

Legh was the son of Rev. Thomas Legh, DD of Cheshire and rector of Sefton and Walton, Lancashire. He inherited the Lyme Park estate in Cheshire from his uncle Francis Legh in 1643. He was educated at Winwick, Lancashire and admitted at St John's College, Cambridge on 18 June 1649. He was admitted at Gray's Inn on 23 May 1653.

In 1656, Legh was elected Member of Parliament for Cheshire in the Second Protectorate Parliament and was re-elected in 1659 for the Third Protectorate Parliament.

In 1660, Legh was elected MP for Newton in the Convention Parliament and was re-elected in 1661 for the Cavalier Parliament. He held the seat until 1679.

Legh died at the age of 53 at Lyme Cheshire and was buried at Winwick, Lancashire.

Legh married Elizabeth Chicheley, daughter of Sir Thomas Chicheley, of Wimpole, Cambridgeshire.

Parliament of England
| Preceded by John Bradshaw; George Booth; John Crew; Henry Brooke | Member of Parliament for Cheshire; 1656–1659; With: George Booth 1656; Peter Brooke 1656; Thomas Marbury 1656; John Bradshaw 1659 | Succeeded by Restored Rump |
