= St Michael's Church, Marbury =

Coordinates: 53.0062°N 2.6564°W

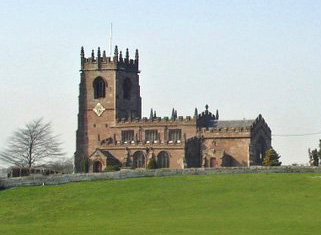
- St Michael's Church, Marbury, from the south

- Location in Cheshire
- OS grid reference: SJ 560,457
- Location: Marbury, Cheshire
- Country: England
- Denomination: Anglican
- Website: St Michael, Marbury

History
- Status: Parish church
- Dedication: Saint Michael

Architecture
- Functional status: Active
- Heritage designation: Grade II*
- Designated: 12 January 1967
- Architect(s): Sir Jeffry Wyatville (chancel 1822); Douglas and Fordham (restoration 1891–92)
- Architectural type: Church
- Style: Gothic, Gothic Revival
- Completed: 1892

Specifications
- Materials: Red sandstone ashlar, Slate roof

Administration
- Province: York
- Diocese: Chester
- Archdeaconry: Chester
- Deanery: Malpas
- Parish: Marbury

Clergy
- Vicar: Rev Veronica Green

St Michael's Church, also known as St Michael and All Angels, stands on a small rise overlooking Big Mere in the village of Marbury, Cheshire, England. The church is recorded in the National Heritage List for England as a designated Grade II* listed building. It is an active Anglican parish church in the diocese of Chester, the archdeaconry of Chester and the deanery of Malpas. Its benefice is combined with those of St Chad, Tushingham, and St Mary, Whitewell.

== History ==
A timber, wattle and daub church was present on the site in 1299. The current church dates from the 15th century, the first incumbent being registered in 1530. The church was a parochial chapel annexed to Whitchurch until 1870, when it became a perpetual curacy. The chancel added in 1822 by Sir Jeffry Wyatville. In 1891–92, the church was restored by Douglas and Fordham, the organ chamber was added, the plaster roof was replaced with carved oak panelling, and oak furnishings were added. To celebrate the 2000 Millennium a new sundial was added to the south wall of the church.

== Architecture ==
=== Exterior ===
The church is built in red sandstone with a slate roof. Its plan consists of a tower at the west end, a three-bay nave with a clerestory, north and south aisles, a chancel with vestry to the north, and a south porch. The tower is Perpendicular in style. It has two string courses which are decorated with carvings of animals and flowers, and there are many gargoyles depicting images such as monkeys, twins, smiling faces and grotesque faces on the exterior of the church. The sandy soil of the area is causing subsidence, with the tower being 25 inches (64 cm) from the vertical in 1999.

=== Interior ===
The octagonal timber pulpit, dating from the 15th century, features crocketed ogee panels; it is the oldest in existence in Cheshire. The church also contains an 1855 monument to William H. Poole with a Gothic canopy. In the tower are charity boards, including a circular one dated 1777. There is a ring of six bells. Four of these are by Rudhall of Gloucester, three being dated 1719, the other 1790. The other bells were cast by John Warner and Sons in 1864 and 1892. The parish registers begin in 1538.

== External features ==
A schoolhouse was built in the churchyard in 1688, but was demolished in 1824. The present churchyard contains the hollow trunk of a 1000-year-old yew, held together by chains, and the war grave of a Royal Field Artillery soldier of World War I. The lych gate is a memorial to those who fell in World War I and is inscribed "Ye who live on, mid-English pastures green. Remember us and think of what might have been". The lych gate is listed at Grade II, as are the sandstone churchyard walls which date from the 16th or 17th century.

== See also ==
- Grade II* listed buildings in Cheshire East
- Listed buildings in Marbury cum Quoisley
- List of church restorations, amendments and furniture by John Douglas
