= Thomas Marbury =

Thomas Marbury was the High Sheriff of Cheshire, serving in that position from 9 December 1620 to 16 November 1621. Obit 1636 Great Budworth (Omerod: The History of the County Palatine and City of Chester)

In 1638 his daughter Mary, by his first wife Eleanor Warburton of Arley (died 1596), married John Bradshaw, and died 1658.

His son, also Thomas Marbury by his second wife Frances Ardeche of Harwarden, was MP for Cheshire for the Second Protectorate Parliament.

This son Thomas Marbury I (ca. 1611 - 1667) was heir to the manor of Marbury, Cheshire. Siding with the Parliamentarians, he raised troops for the Battle of Nantwich of 1644. It was widely suspected that Marbury was not a military man himself.

Thomas Marbury was among several Cheshire Parliamentarians to be pardoned by Charles II in 1651.

He served in the Second Protectorate Parliament from 17 September 1656, to 26 June 1657.

Parliament of England
Preceded by John Bradshaw; Sir George Booth, Bt; Henry Brooke; John Crew	Member of Parliament for Cheshire; 1656; With: Richard Legh; Peter Brooke; Sir George Booth, Bt	Succeeded by John Bradshaw; Richard Legh
