= John Crew =

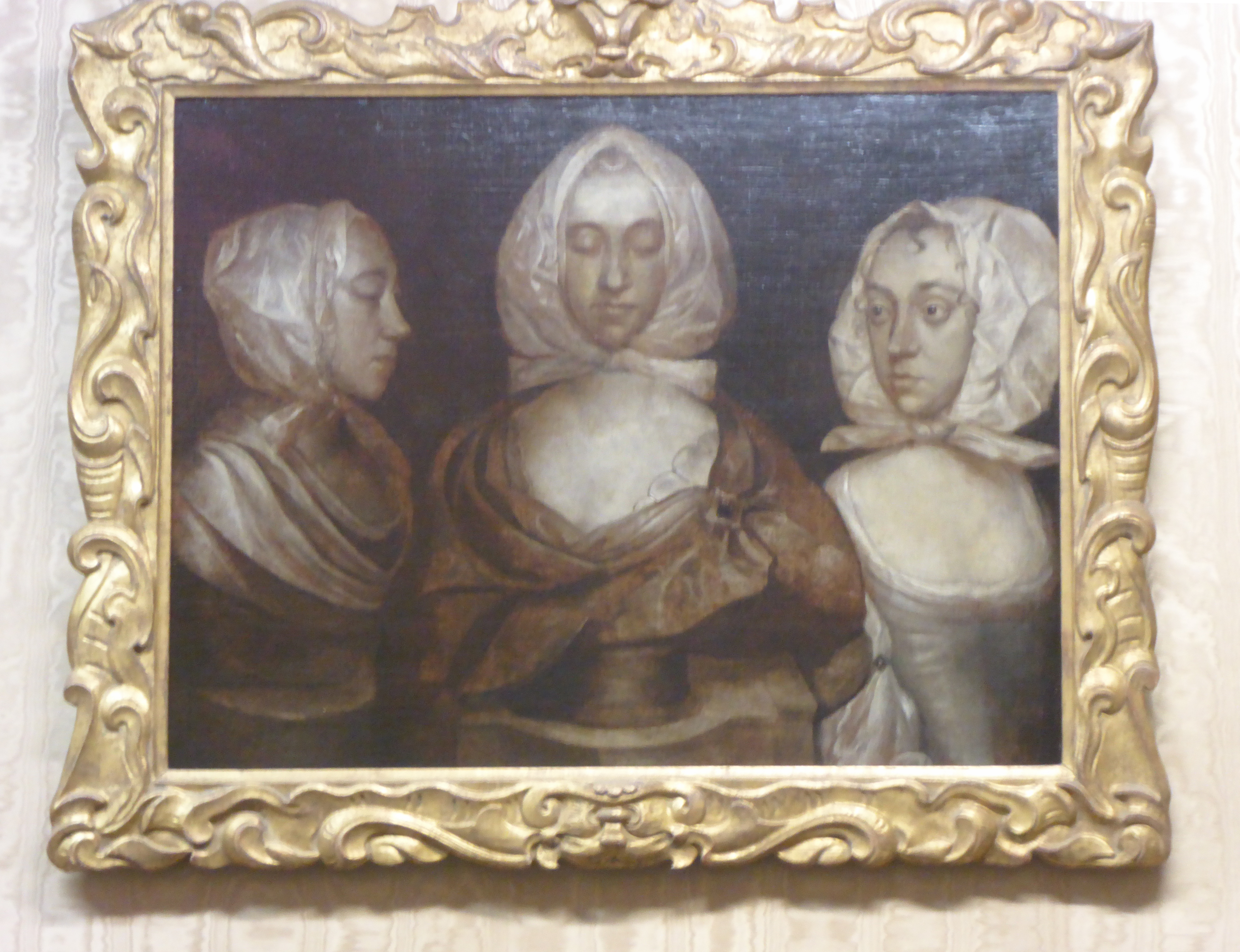
Triple Portrait of Crewe's wife, Mary Done, by William Dobson, painted 1635-38

John Crewe or Crew (1603 – 12 May 1670) was an English barrister and politician who sat in the House of Commons in 1654.

Crewe was the second son of Sir Ranulph Crewe, Lord Chief Justice of England, and his first wife Julia Clipsby. He matriculated from St John's College, Cambridge at Easter 1619 and was admitted at Lincoln's Inn on 28 October 1618. He became a barrister in 1626.

In 1654, Crewe was elected Member of Parliament for Cheshire in the First Protectorate Parliament.

Crewe obtained the manor of Utkinton through his marriage. He died at the age of 67 and was buried at Tarporley where there is a monument to him.

In 1636, Crewe married Mary Done (1604–90), daughter of Sir John Done. The youngest of their four children was Sir John Crewe. Crewe's brother Clipsby was also an MP.

Parliament of England
Preceded by Robert Buckenfield; Henry Birkenhead	Member of Parliament for Cheshire; 1654; With: John Bradshaw; George Booth; Henry Book	Succeeded by Richard Legh; George Booth; Thomas Marbury; Peter Brooke
