= Peter Brooke (17th-century MP) =

English politician (1602–1685)

Sir Peter Brooke (c. 1602 – 1685) was an English politician who sat in the House of Commons at various times between 1646 and 1656.

Brooke was the younger son of Thomas Brooke of Norton by Eleanor Gerard, his third wife.

In 1646, he was elected Member of Parliament for Newton in the Long Parliament. In 1656 he was elected MP for Cheshire in the Second Protectorate Parliament.

Brooke, then of Mere Hall, Cheshire which he bought in 1652, was knighted on 24 July 1660. He was High Sheriff of Cheshire in 1669.

He married three times:firstly, Alice, the daughter and heiress of Richard Hulse of Kenilworth, Warwickshire with whom he had two sons; secondly Frances, the daughter of Nicholas Trot of Quickshot, Hertfordshire and the widow of William Merbury of Merbury; and thirdly Mabell, the daughter of William Farrington of Werden and the widow of Richard Clayton of Crooke. He was succeeded by his elder son, Thomas. His younger son Richard married Margaret Charnock, heiress of Astley Hall, Chorley.

Parliament of England
| Preceded by Sir Roger Palmer; William Ashurst | Member of Parliament for Newton; 1646–1648; With: William Ashurst | Succeeded by William Ashurst |
| Preceded by John Bradshaw; Sir George Booth, Bt; Henry Brooke; John Crew | Member of Parliament for Cheshire; 1656; With: Richard Legh; Thomas Marbury; Sir George Booth, Bt | Succeeded by John Bradshaw; Richard Legh |
