= Listed buildings in Marbury cum Quoisley =

Marbury cum Quoisley is a former civil parish in Cheshire East, England. It contained 11 buildings that are recorded in the National Heritage List for England as designated listed buildings. Of these, one is listed at Grade II*, the middle grade, and the others are at Grade II. Apart from the village of Marbury the parish was rural. The major buildings in the parish are St Michael's Church and Marbury Hall; these and some associated buildings are listed. Also listed are some 16th and 17th-century houses and farm buildings that are timber-framed or incorporate timber framing. The parish included the part of the Combermere estate that contains a monumental obelisk that is listed.

== Key ==
Grade	Criteria
II*	Particularly important buildings of more than special interest
II	Buildings of national importance and special interest

== Buildings ==
Name and location	Photograph	Date	Notes	Grade
St Michael's Church; 53.00623°N 2.65635°W		15th century	The chancel was added to the church in 1822 by Sir Jeffry Wyatville, and the church was restored by Douglas and Fordham in 1891–92. It is built in sandstone with a slate roof. The church consists of a nave with a clerestory, aisles, a chancel with a vestry to the north, a south porch, and a west tower.	II*
Hadley Hall; 53.01045°N 2.66105°W	—	16th century	A farmhouse that was altered and expanded in the late 17th and in the 19th centuries. It is partly timber-framed and partly in brick, and has a slate roof. The house is in two storeys, and has a three-bay front, the outer bays projecting forward and gabled. The windows have cambered heads.	II
Churchyard wall, St Michael's Church; 53.00610°N 2.65622°W		16th or 17th century (probable)	The churchyard wall is in sandstone and has steeply chamfered coping stones. The wall extends round three sides of the churchyard.	II
Marbury Cottage; 53.00687°N 2.65655°W		Late 16th or early 17th century	A house that was enlarged in about 1660 and again in about 1720, with further alterations in the 20th century. The older parts are timber-framed with brick infill, the newer part is in brick, and the house has a slate roof. The house is in two storeys, and has a T-shaped plan. Projecting towards the road is a gabled timber-framed wing, behind it to the left is another timber-framed wing, and to the right is a brick wing. At the rear is a brick chimney breast.	II
Black and White Cottages; 53.00688°N 2.65589°W		Late 16th or early 17th century	This originated as a house with a service wing in two ranges added later; the whole building was later divided into four cottages. The house is timber-framed with rendered infill, and the service wings are in brick painted to resemble timber-framing. The whole building is in two storeys, the service wings being at a lower level. The original house has a jettied gable on the right, and the newer parts are in two wings at right angles, one with a gable facing the road. The windows are casements.	II
Outbuilding, Swan Inn; 53.00707°N 2.65567°W		17th century	A farm building partly timber-framed with brick infill, and partly in brick, some of which is painted to resemble timber framing. It has a tiled roof, and is in two storeys. On the road front, the main section contains a double door, a wicket door, a rectangular casement window and two gabled half-dormers with casements; all the windows have lattice glazing. At the rear are more doorways and windows, and two square pitch holes.	II
Old Farmhouse, Marbury Hall; 53.00120°N 2.65412°W	—	17th century	The farmhouse was extended and altered in the 19th century. It is basically timber-framed with brick infill, and was largely refaced in brick. It has a roof that is partly tiled and partly slated. The house is in two storeys, and has a projecting gabled bay on the left side of the entrance front. The windows are casements, and in the upper storey are gabled dormers.	II
Marbury Hall; 53.00127°N 2.65605°W		1806	A country house built in Regency style. It is in brick with stone dressings and a slate roof. The house is in two storeys and has a symmetrical seven-bay front. The doorway has engaged antae with an entablature, and contains doors formerly in Eaton Hall. It is flanked by three-bay bow windows. Most of the windows are sashes.	II
Gate Lodge, Marbury Hall; 53.00180°N 2.65026°W		1876	The gate lodge is built in sandstone and brick painted to resemble timber-framing, with applied timber-framing to the upper parts, and has a tiled roof. It is in two storeys, with a single storey extension on each side. At the front is a canted bay window. The upper storey is jettied and contains a four-light casement window surrounded by decorative timber framing.	II
Monumental Obelisk; 52.99826°N 2.63385°W		1890	The obelisk stands in the Combermere estate and is to the memory of the 1st Viscount Combermere who died in 1865. It is built in sandstone and consists of a plinth on two steps with a cornice on which stands the obelisk. On each side of the plinth is a panel, some of which carry an inscription.	II
Lychgate, St Michael's Church; 53.00651°N 2.65627°W		c. 1919	The lychgate was built as a war memorial. It has a sandstone base, timber upper parts, and a stone-slate roof. The side walls end in piers with pyramidal caps. There are inscriptions on the angle braces and on the beams.	II

== See also ==
- Listed buildings in Bickley
- Listed buildings in Dodcott cum Wilkesley
- Listed buildings in Norbury
- Listed buildings in Tushingham cum Grindley
- Listed buildings in Whitchurch Urban, Shropshire
- Listed buildings in Wirswall
- Listed buildings in Wrenbury cum Frith
