= Norbury, Cheshire =

Hamlet in Cheshire, England

Coordinates: 53.023°N 2.652°W

Norbury
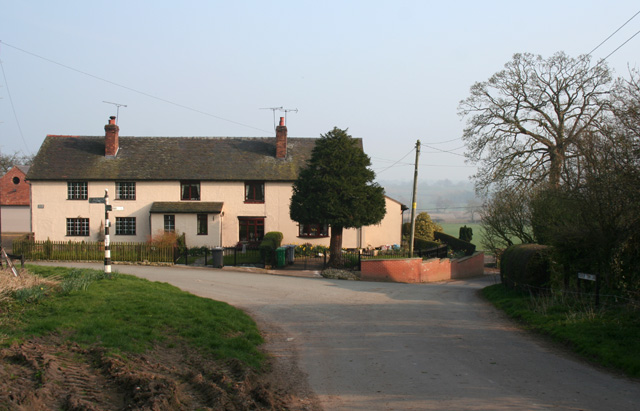
- Terraced cottages in Norbury hamlet

- Location within Cheshire
- Population: 194 (2011)
- OS grid reference: SJ563468
- Civil parish: Marbury and District
- Unitary authority: Cheshire East
- Ceremonial county: Cheshire
- Region: North West
- Country: England
- Sovereign state: United Kingdom
- Post town: WHITCHURCH
- Postcode district: SY13
- Dialling code: 01948
- Police: Cheshire
- Fire: Cheshire
- Ambulance: North West
- UK Parliament: Chester South and Eddisbury

Norbury is a hamlet in the parish of Marbury and District, in Cheshire East, Cheshire, England. Norbury was formerly a civil parish until 2023. The hamlet of Norbury lies around 5 miles (8 km) north of Whitchurch, Shropshire. Nearby villages include No Man's Heath, Marbury and Wrenbury.

== History ==
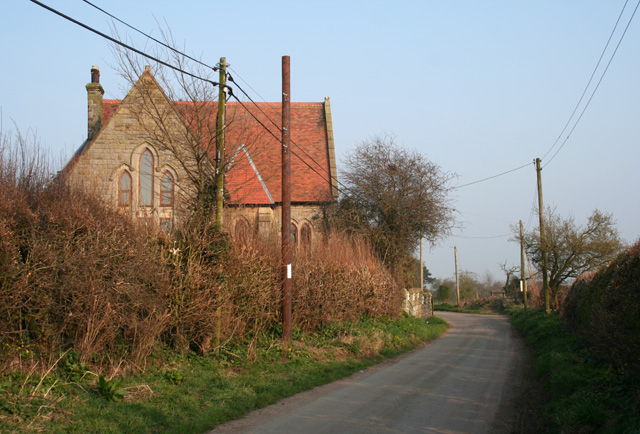
Former chapel on Norbury Town Lane

Norberie was a small manor at the time of the Domesday survey in 1086. It was then held by William Malbank, Baron of Wich Malbank (Nantwich), and had been held by Earl Harold before the Norman Conquest. The record is combined with the nearby manors of Wirswall and Marbury. The Anglo-Saxon manor is believed to have been a fortified farmstead.

There were three Nonconformist chapels in the 19th century, all now defunct. A Wesleyan Methodist chapel was constructed in 1834 on Norbury Town Lane in Norbury hamlet, and appears in John Marius Wilson's gazetteer entry of 1870–72. Another Wesleyan Methodist chapel, also on Norbury Town Lane, dates from 1899 and closed in 1975. A Congregationalist chapel was built in 1868 on Common Lane in Norbury Common.

== Governance ==
There are two tiers of local government covering Norbury, at parish and unitary authority level: Marbury and District Parish Council and Cheshire East Council. The parish council meets at the village hall in Marbury.

=== Administrative history ===
Norbury was historically a township in the ancient parish of Marbury, which formed part of the Nantwich hundred of Cheshire. From the 17th century onwards, parishes were gradually given various civil functions under the poor laws, in addition to their original ecclesiastical functions. In some cases, including Marbury, the civil functions were exercised by each township separately rather than the parish as a whole. In 1866, the legal definition of 'parish' was changed to be the areas used for administering the poor laws, and so Norbury became a separate civil parish.

The civil parish included the small settlements of Gauntons Bank, Hurst Green, Swanwick Green, Norbury Common and Holtridge, and had a population of 194 in 2011. It had an area of 628 hectares (1,550 acres).

In 1959, a grouped parish council was created covering the three civil parishes of Norbury, Marbury cum Quoisley, and Wirswall, called the Marbury and District Parish Council. In 2023, the three civil parishes within the group were merged into a single civil parish called Marbury and District.

From 1974 until 2009, at a district level the civil parish formed part of the borough of Crewe and Nantwich. In 2009 the new borough of Cheshire East was created, with its council being a unitary authority, taking over district-level functions from Crewe and Nantwich Borough Council and county-level functions from Cheshire County Council, both of which were abolished.

== Geography and transport ==
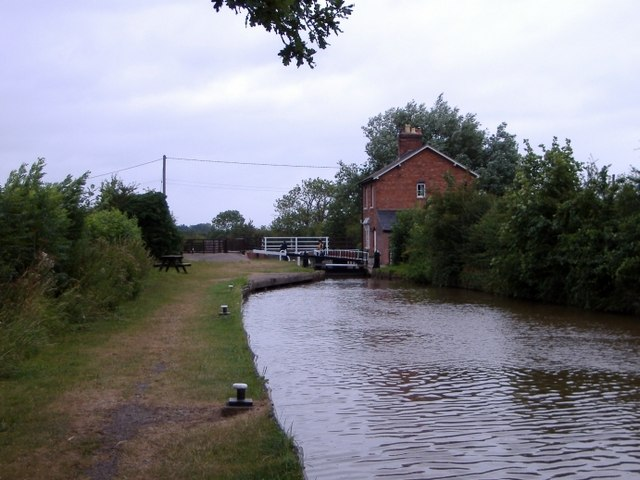
Llangollen Canal at Marbury Lock

The terrain is undulating with low hills. The hamlet of Norbury stands on a low hill. The Llangollen Canal runs to the south of Norbury. Steer Brook flows out of Bar Mere in Bickley and then to the west of Norbury. The ponds called Norbury Meres are named after Norbury, but lie in the adjacent parish of Cholmondeley. There are several small areas of woodland, including Canal Covert around the canal and Steer Brook, Handley Park Covert, and Norbury Common in the north-west corner of the parish, near Common Farm.

The A49 runs north–south just west of Norbury, connecting via Marbury Road and Snab Lane with a network of lanes within Norbury parish. Two lanes lead towards Wrenbury: Frith Lane runs east to Cholmondeley Lane just outside Wrenbury village, and Holtridge Lane runs north to connect with the same lane further west. Another two lanes go south to Marbury: Marbury Road and School Lane, via two road bridges over the canal: Steer Bridge (carrying Marbury Road) and Church Bridge (School Lane). A lock, Marbury Lock, is located at Church Bridge.

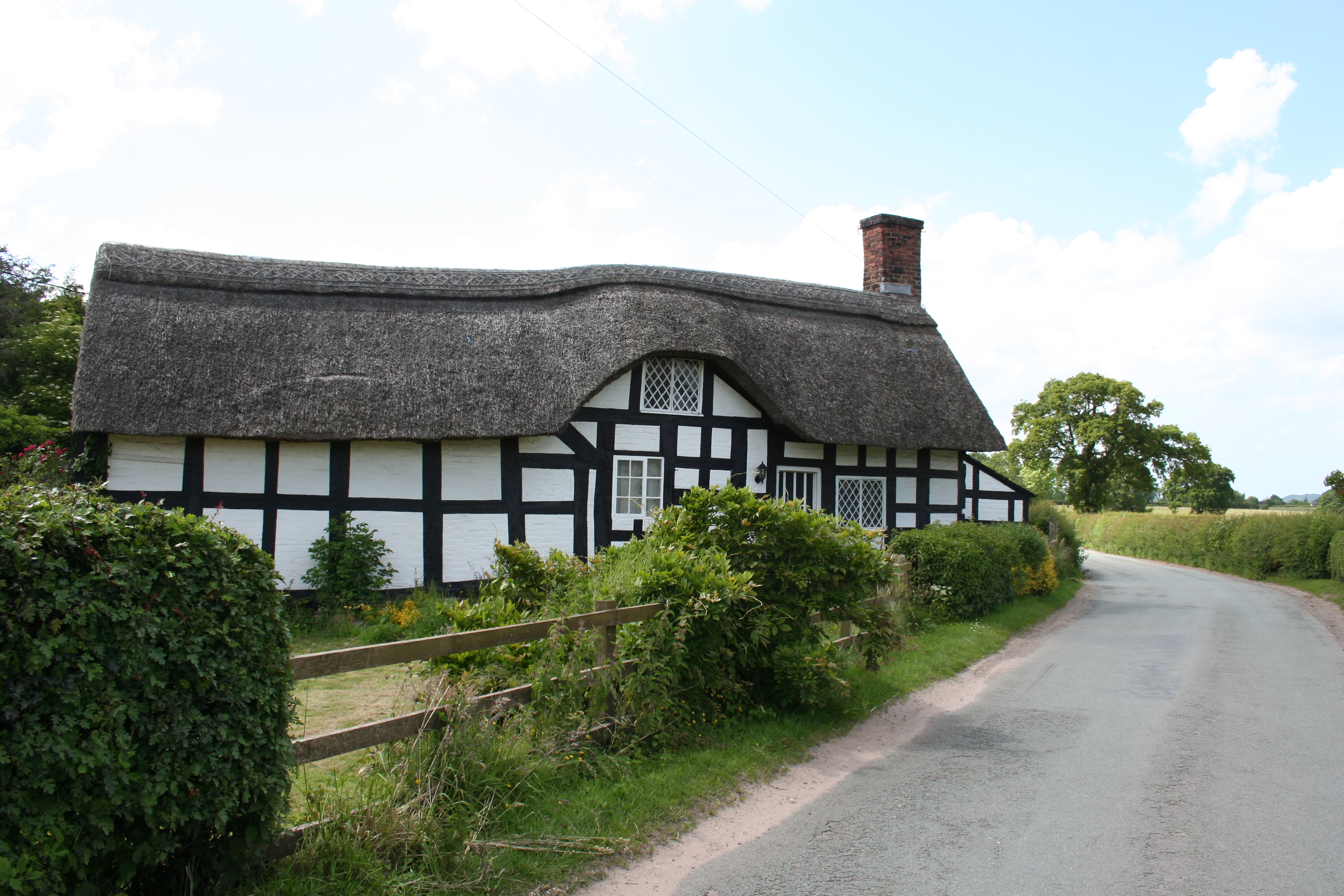
Stokes Cottage, Swanwick Green

== Demography ==
The population has declined since the 19th century; historical population figures are 330 (1801), 403 (1851), 330 (1881), 289 (1901) and 241 (1951). According to the 2001 census, the civil parish had a population of 190, remaining steady at 194 in 87 households at the 2011 census.

== Landmarks ==
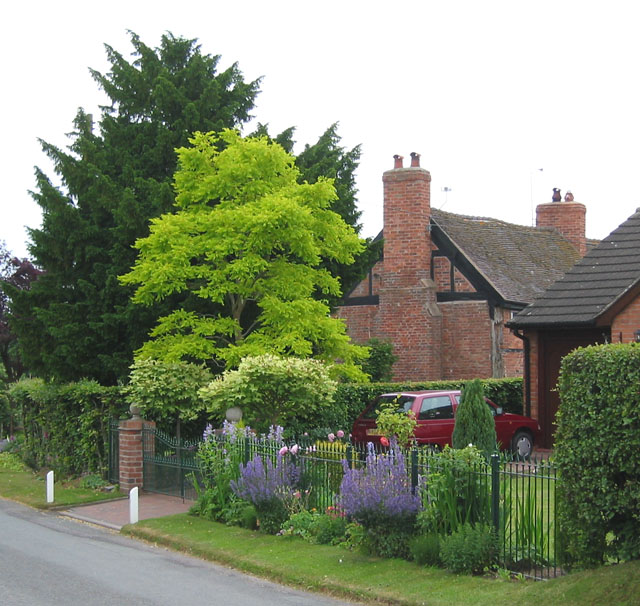
Brook Farmhouse, Gauntons Bank

Several buildings in the former area of Norbury civil parish are listed at grade II, the lowest of the three grades. The oldest listed building may be Stokes Cottage in Swanwick Green, a timber-framed longhouse with brick infill and a thatched roof; it dates from the 16th or early 17th century. Another candidate is Brook Farmhouse in Gauntons Bank, part of which originally dates from the late 16th century, and was subsequently extended several times. The original building is timber framed with brick infill and a tiled roof.

The Holtridge in Holtridge is a T-shaped, red-brick farmhouse dating originally from the early 17th century; it has a 20th-century oriel window. Olive Cottage in Norbury Common is a timber-framed building with brick infill and a thatched roof; it dates originally from the mid-17th century. Church Bridge on the Llangollen Canal dates from the late 18th or early 19th century; its single span is constructed of red sandstone.

== Education ==
There are no educational facilities in Norbury. The civil parish falls within the catchment areas of Brine Leas School in Nantwich, and Wrenbury Primary School.

== See also ==
- Listed buildings in Norbury, Cheshire
