= George Booth, 1st Baron Delamer =

17th-century English parliamentarian

The Right Honourable The Lord Delamer MP
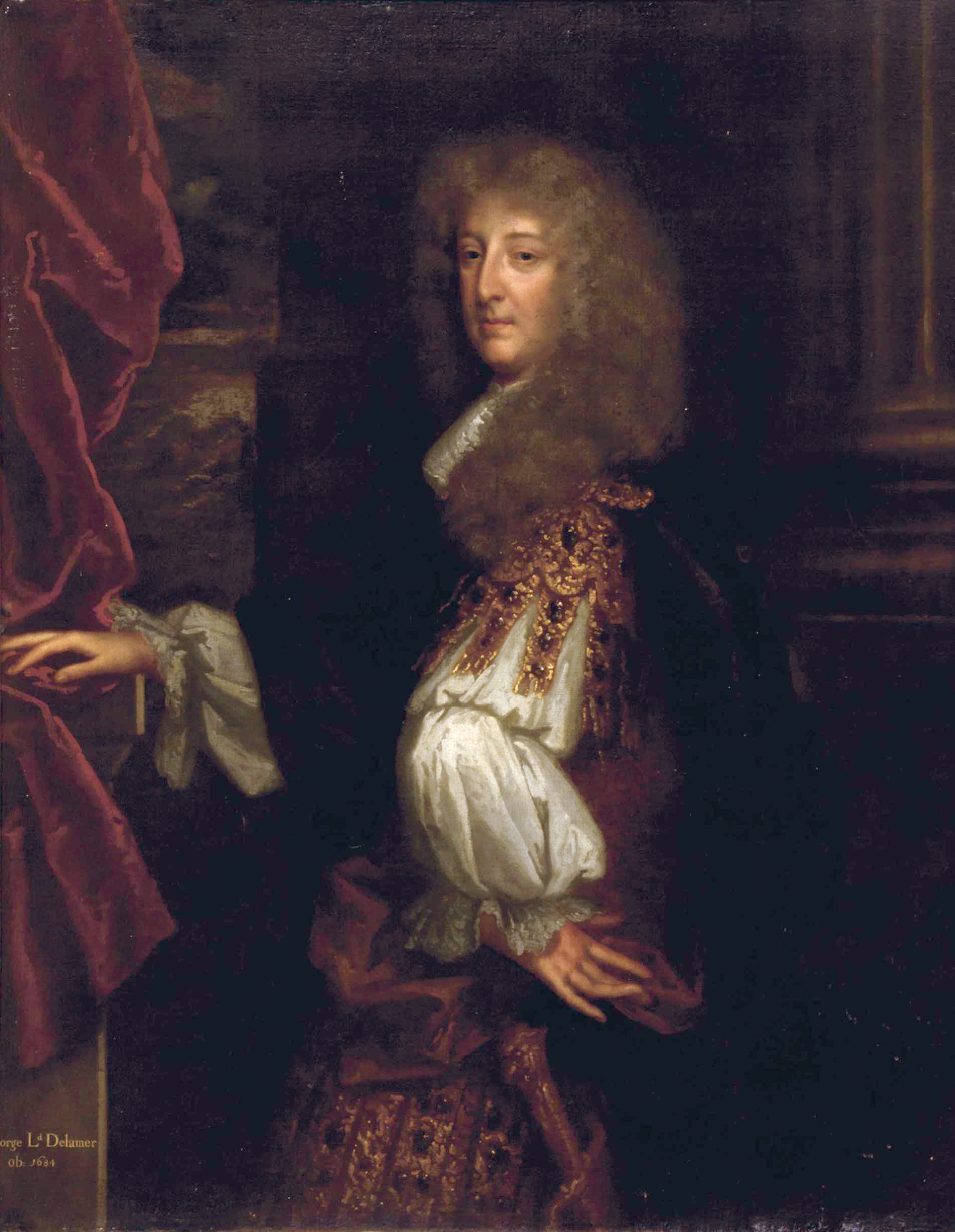
- Portrait by the circle of Sir Godfrey Kneller

Custos Rotulorum of Cheshire
- In office 1660–1673

MP for Cheshire
- In office 1660–1661

Personal details
- Born: 18 December 1622 Dunham Massey, Cheshire
- Died: 8 August 1684 (aged 61) Dunham Massey, Cheshire
- Resting place: St Mary the Virgin, Bowdon
- Spouse(s): Lady Katherine Clinton (1639-1643); Lady Elizabeth Grey (1644-1684)
- Children: Seven sons, six daughters
- Parent(s): Sir William Booth (died 1636); Vere Egerton (died 1629)
- Occupation: Landowner, soldier, politician

Military service
- Allegiance: England 1642–1646
- Years of service: 1642 to 1646
- Rank: Colonel
- Battles/wars: First English Civil War; Manchester 1642; Preston 1643; Siege of Chester; Booth's Uprising

George Booth, 1st Baron Delamer (18 December 1622 – 8 August 1684), was an English landowner and politician from Cheshire, who served as an MP from 1646 to 1661, when he was elevated to the House of Lords as Baron Delamer.

A member of the moderate Presbyterian faction that dominated the Long Parliament and many of the pre-war county elites, Booth fought for Parliament during the First English Civil War. He relinquished his commission when elected MP for Cheshire in 1646, a seat he retained throughout the Protectorate.

Suspected of involvement in the 1655 Penruddock uprising to restore Charles II of England, in 1659 he led another attempt known as Booth's Uprising. Intended as part of a larger conspiracy, it was quickly defeated, but Booth escaped punishment and was rewarded with a peerage after the 1660 Stuart Restoration. However, concerns over reforms to the Church of England and use of the Royal Prerogative led him into opposition, and during the 1679 to 1681 Exclusion Crisis, he supported barring the Catholic James from the throne. He died in August 1684 and was succeeded by his son Henry, who briefly served as Chancellor of the Exchequer after the 1688 Glorious Revolution.

== Civil War ==
George Booth was the son of William Booth of Dunham Massey and Margaret Assheton. William Booth (d. 1636) was the son and heir apparent to Sir George Booth, 1st Baronet (1566–1652), of the ancient family settled at Dunham Massey in Cheshire, by his wife Vere Egerton, daughter and co-heir of Sir Thomas Egerton. George took an active part in the Civil War alongside his grandfather, Sir George Booth, on the Parliamentarians' side. He was returned to the Long Parliament as Member of Parliament for Cheshire in 1645, and succeeded to the baronetcy on his grandfather's death.

== Interregnum ==
Sir George Booth was nominated to the Barebones Parliament for Cheshire in 1653 and was elected MP for Cheshire in the First Protectorate Parliament in 1654 and in the Second Protectorate Parliament in 1656. In 1655 he was appointed military commissioner for Cheshire and treasurer at war. He was one of the excluded members who tried and failed to regain their seats in the restored Rump Parliament after the fall of Richard Cromwell in 1659.

He had for some time been regarded by the Royalists as a well-wisher to their cause, and was described to the King in May 1659 as "very considerable in his county, a Presbyterian in opinion, yet so moral a man ... I think Your Majesty may safely [rely] on him and his promises which are considerable and hearty". He thus became one of the chief leaders of the new Royalists who united with the Cavaliers to effect the Restoration.

=== Uprising ===
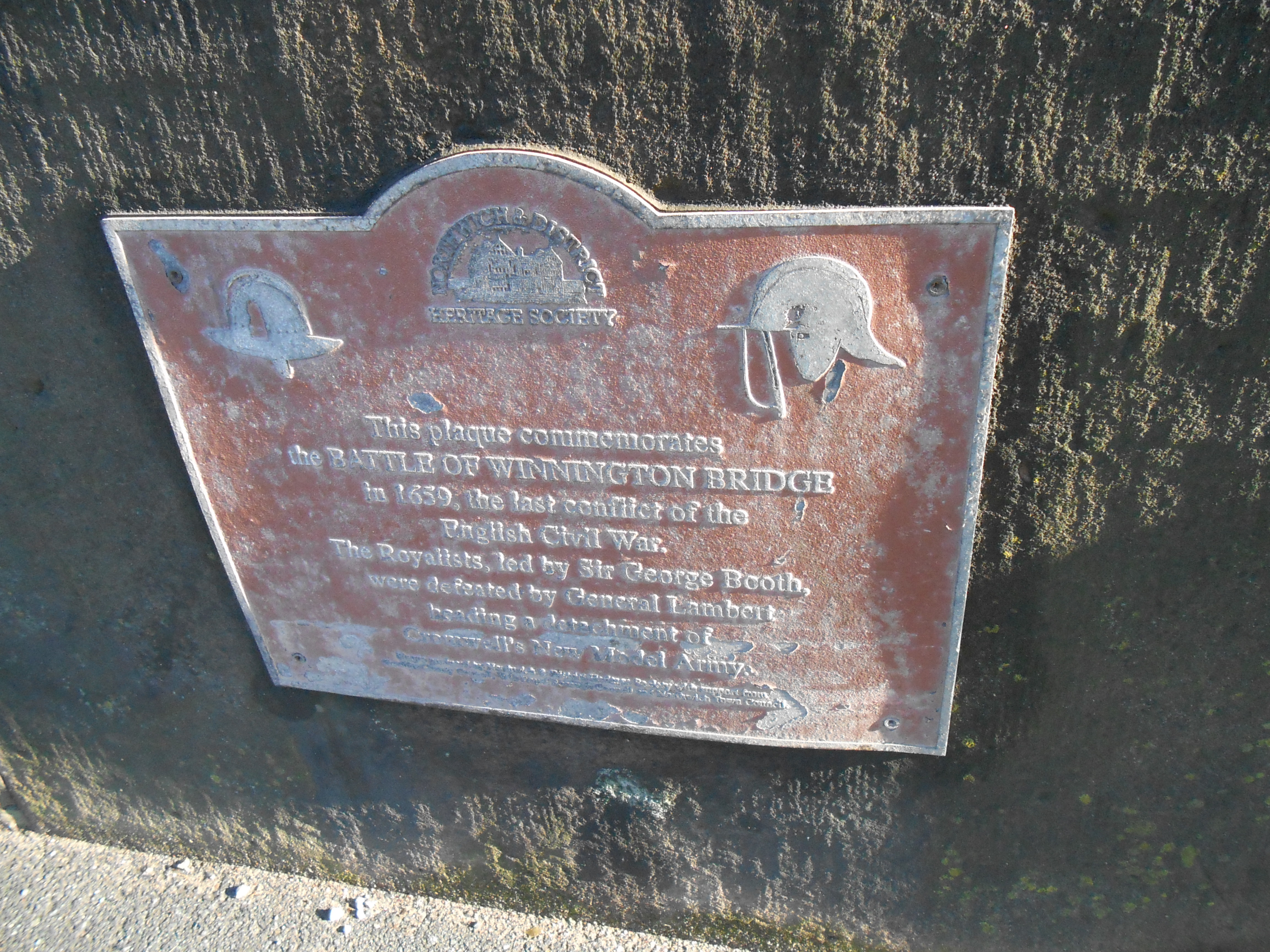
A memorial to the battle photographed in 2013

An uprising was arranged for 5 August 1659 in several districts, and Booth received a commission from Charles II to assume command of the revolutionary forces in Lancashire, Cheshire, and North Wales.

After gaining control of Chester on the 19 August, he issued a proclamation declaring that "arms had been taken up in vindication of the freedom of Parliament, of the known laws, liberty and property", and then marched towards York. The plot, however, was known to John Thurloe. Having been foiled in other parts of the country, Lambert's advancing forces defeated Booth's men at the Battle of Winnington Bridge near Northwich. Booth himself escaped disguised as a woman, but was discovered at Newport Pagnell on the 23 August whilst having a shave, and was imprisoned in the Tower of London.

== Restoration ==
Estate of Sir George Booth Act 1660
- Act of Parliament
- Parliament of England
- Long title: An Act for enabling of Sir George Booth Baronet to make Leases and Sales of Part of his Estate.
- Citation: 12 Cha. 2. c. 14 Pr.
- Territorial extent: England and Wales

Dates
- Royal assent: 13 September 1660
- Commencement: 25 April 1660 (Note: Start of session.)

Status: Current legislation

However, Booth was soon liberated and returned to his seat in the Convention Parliament in 1660. He was one of the twelve members deputed to carry the message of the House of Commons to Charles II at The Hague. In July 1660 he received a grant of £10,000 according to the House of Commons Journal for 30 July 1660, having refused the larger sum of £20,000 at first offered to him, and on 20 April 1661, on the occasion of the coronation, he was created Baron Delamer, with a licence to nominate six new knights. The same year he was appointed Custos Rotulorum of Cheshire.

In later years he showed himself staunchly opposed to the reactionary policies of the government. He died on 8 August 1684, and was buried in the Booth Chapel at Bowdon Church.

== Family ==
Booth's first marriage was to Lady Catherine Clinton, daughter and co-heir of Theophilus Clinton, 4th Earl of Lincoln, with whom he had one daughter, Vera Booth. After the death of his first wife, he married Lady Elizabeth Grey, daughter of Henry Grey, 1st Earl of Stamford, by whom, besides five daughters, he had seven sons, the second of whom, Henry, succeeded him in the Booth titles and estates, which included Dunham Massey Hall and Staley Hall. Henry later became Earl of Warrington. Although this earldom became extinct on the death of the 2nd Earl in 1758, the Booth Barony of Delamer carried on another generation, only becoming extinct upon the 4th Baron's death in 1770. The Booths' even older baronetcy title then devolved upon a distant cousin, the Rev Sir George Booth, Rector of Ashton-under-Lyne, although the family's representation in the House of Lords had ceased. The Delamer title was later recreated (as Delamere) in 1821 for the Cholmondeley family, kinsmen of the Marquesses of Cholmondeley and the Cholmeley baronets.

Name	Birth	Death	Notes
By Lady Catherine Clinton
Vere Booth	19 July 1643	14 November 1717	unmarried; Canonbury House, Islington
By Lady Elizabeth Grey
William Booth	17 April 1648	20 Jan 1661	
Henry Booth, 1st Earl of Warrington	13 Jan 1652	2 Jan 1693/94	
Charles Booth		died at Paris	
George Booth		1726	married Lucy Robartes
Very Rev Robert Booth	1662	8 Aug 1730	
Elizabeth Booth		4 July 1681	married Edward Conway, 1st Earl of Conway; no surviving issue
Diana Booth		7 October 1713	married 1677, Admiral Sir Ralph Delaval, 2nd Bt; married 21 October 1699, Sir Edward Blackett, 2nd Bt
Cecil Booth		16 May 1711	unmarried
Ann Booth		died young	
Jane Booth		died young	
Sophia Booth		died young	
Nevill Booth	1667	1685	merchant adventurer

== Bibliography ==
- Helms, M. W.; Hampson, Gillian; Henning, Basil Duke (1983). "Booth, Sir George, 2nd Bt. (1622–84), of Dunham Massey, Cheshire.". In Henning, Basil Duke (ed.). The History of Parliament: the House of Commons 1660–1690. Boydell and Brewer.
- Kelsey, Sean (January 2006) [2004]. "Booth, George, first Baron Delamer (1622–1684)". Oxford Dictionary of National Biography (online ed.). Oxford University Press. doi:10.1093/ref:odnb/2877. (Subscription, Wikipedia Library access or UK public library membership required.)
- Ormerod, George (1819). The History of the County Palatine and City of Chester. Vol. 2. Lackington. p. 111.
- Young, Peter (1973). The English Civil War armies. Issue 14 of Men-at-arms series (illustrated, reprint ed.). Osprey Publishing. ISBN 0-85045-119-1.

Attribution:

Parliament of England
Preceded by Peter Venables; Sir William Brereton, Bt	Member of Parliament for Cheshire; 1646–1653; With: Sir William Brereton, Bt	Succeeded by Robert Duckenfield; Henry Birkenhead
Preceded by Robert Duckenfield; Henry Birkenhead	Member of Parliament for Cheshire; 1654–1659; With: John Bradshaw 1654–1656; Henry Brooke 1654–1656; John Crew 1654–1656; Richard Legh 1656–1659; Thomas Marbury 1656–1659; Peter Brooke 1656–1659	Succeeded by John Bradshaw; Richard Legh
Preceded by John Bradshaw; Richard Legh	Member of Parliament for Cheshire; 1660–1661; With: Sir Thomas Mainwaring, Bt	Succeeded by The Lord Brereton; Peter Venables
Honorary titles
Vacant English Interregnum Title last held by Sir Orlando Bridgeman	Custos Rotulorum of Cheshire; 1661–1673	Succeeded by Henry Booth
Peerage of England
New creation	Baron Delamer; 1st creation 1661–1684	Succeeded by Henry Booth
Baronetage of England
Preceded by George Booth	Baronet (of Dunham Massey); 1652–1684	Succeeded by Henry Booth
