= Quoisley Meres =

Bodies of water in Cheshire, England

- Site of Special Scientific Interest
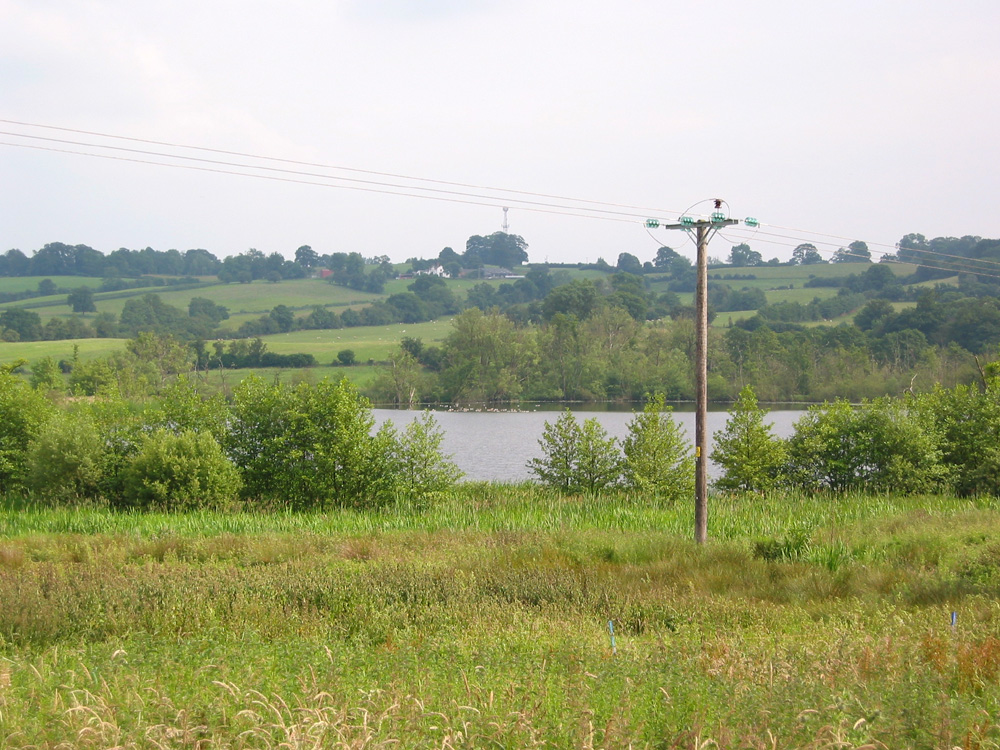
- Quoisley Big Mere

- Location within Cheshire
- Location of Quoisley Meres.
- Area of search: Cheshire
- Grid reference: SJ548455
- Coordinates: 53.005°N 2.674°W
- Interest: Biological
- Area: 28.25 ha (69.8 acres)
- Notification date: 1963

Quoisley Meres refers to two meres, Quoisley Big Mere and Quoisley Little Mere, near the village of Marbury, in Cheshire, England.

Glacial in origin, the meres have nutrient-rich water. The meres, fringing reed beds and surrounding damp grassland are a Site of Special Scientific Interest, and have also been designated Wetlands of International Importance, as part of the Midland Meres and Mosses Ramsar site. The meres form an important habitat for invertebrates and birds, and the site contains over a hundred plant species, including tufted-sedge, marsh fern and meadow thistle, which are all rare in Cheshire. Natural England considered the site's condition to be unfavourable in 2009.

== Geography ==
Quoisley Meres lie on the Cheshire Plain, near the boundary with Shropshire, at an average elevation of around 75 metres. In common with the majority of meres in the Meres and Mosses natural area, they probably represent glacial kettle holes, formed at the end of the last ice age, some ten or fifteen thousand years ago. The meres are located immediately south of the track from Wirswall Road to Mere Farm, around ¾ mile west of the village of Marbury; the nearest town is Whitchurch, around 2½ miles to the south. There are two meres; the larger, Quoisley Big Mere, is at SJ546455, and the smaller, Quoisley Little Mere, at SJ549455. A narrow strip of woodland, Holly Rough, lines the farm track immediately to the north of Little Mere. The catchment area of the meres is 136 hectares (340 acres).

The Site of Special Scientific Interest (SSSI) of Quoisley Meres was designated in 1963 and occupies 28.25 hectares (69.8 acres). The SSSI encompasses both meres, their margins and some of the surrounding pasture; Holly Rough is excluded. The meres were designated Wetlands of International Importance in 1994, as part of the Midland Meres and Mosses Ramsar site. They also lie within the Wirswall/Marbury/Combermere Area of Special County Value.

== Habitats, flora and fauna ==
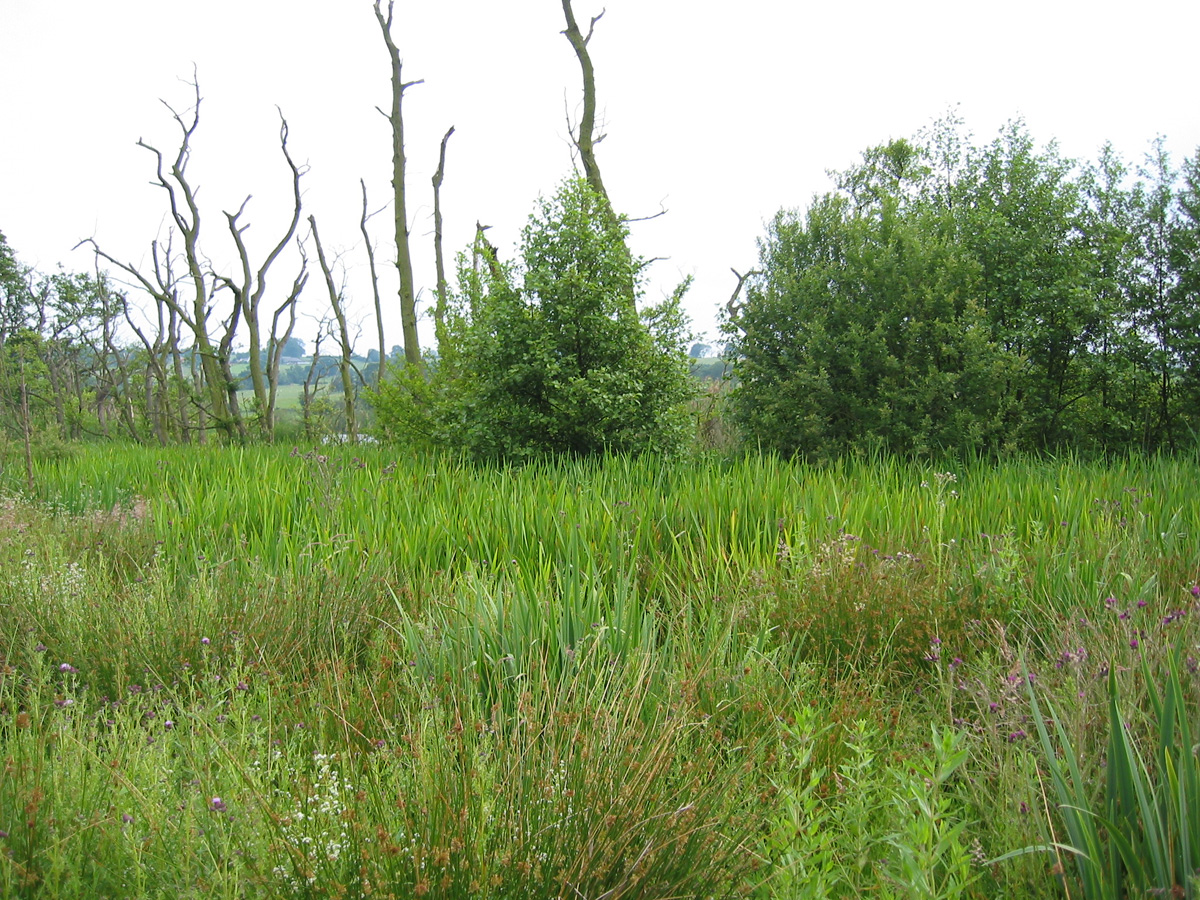
Reed beds at Big Mere

The two meres have nutrient-rich or eutrophic open water with the dominant aquatic plants being water lilies; Big Mere has both white and yellow water lilies, while Little Mere has predominantly white. Both meres are surrounded by well-developed reed beds, with Big Mere having a particularly large variety of species including common club-rush, greater pond-sedge, lesser reedmace and tufted-sedge, which is rare in Cheshire. Big Mere has a narrow fringe of predominantly alder woodland. The SSSI also encompasses damp grassland between and around the two meres, which contains a wide variety of plant species including brown sedge and purple small-reed, as well as marsh fern and meadow thistle, which are rarely found in Cheshire. A total of 108 plant species has been recorded at the site.

The meres support abundant aquatic invertebrate species, especially beetles and bugs, with some rare species on record. There is a low density of fish, particularly in Little Mere; the predominant species is roach, with some eel, pike, tench and trout. The meres form an important habitat for birds, with gadwall, garganey and ruddy ducks among the species that have been observed here.

== Management and current status ==
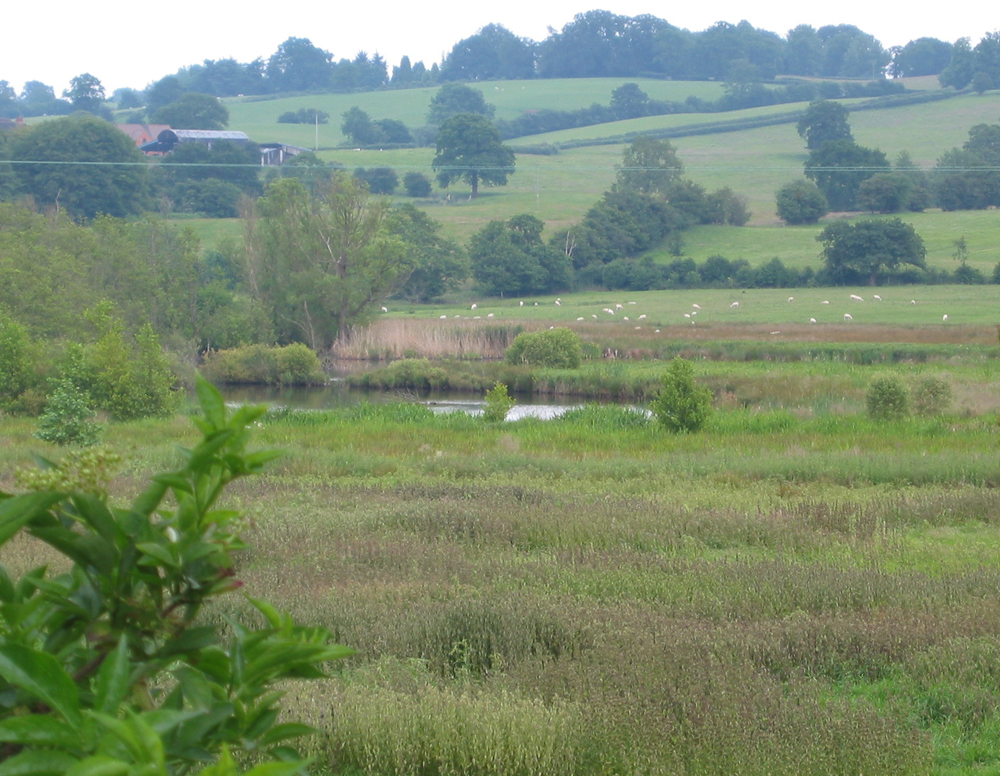
Quoisley Little Mere

The meres are on private land; public access to the site is limited to a public footpath from Wirswall Road which crosses the field to the east of Quoisley Little Mere. The Big Mere can be viewed from the track from Wirswall Road to Mere Farm. Fishing (except by the owner) is not permitted.

The site was assessed by Natural England as in an unfavourable condition in 2009; 92.5% of the area, including both meres, was declining, with only 7.6% of the site in a stable condition. This was due to a combination of factors including drainage, inappropriate water levels, poor ditch management, lack of pest and weed control, and water pollution and sedimentation due to discharge and agricultural runoff; undergrazing was also a problem for one of the grassland areas.

== See also ==
- List of Sites of Special Scientific Interest in Cheshire
