= Marbury, Cheshire =

Village in Cheshire, England

Coordinates: 53.007°N 2.656°W

Marbury
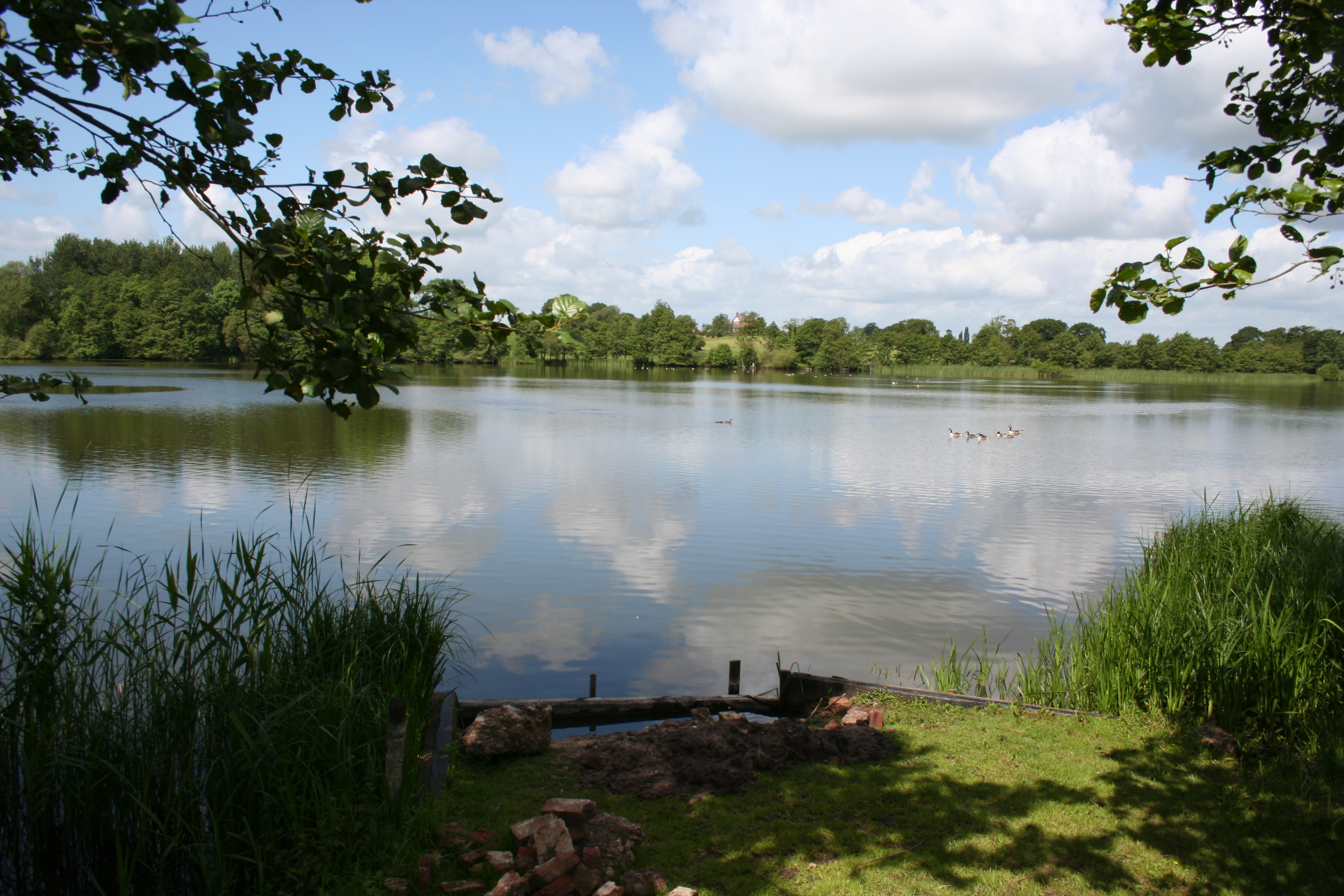
- Marbury Big Mere

- Location within Cheshire
- Population: 541 (Marbury and District parish, 2021) (Note: Combined total from the 2021 census for the three parishes of Marbury cum Quoisley (251), Norbury (199), and Wirswall (91), which were subsequently merged into a single parish in 2023.)
- OS grid reference: SJ560457
- Civil parish: Marbury and District
- Unitary authority: Cheshire East
- Ceremonial county: Cheshire
- Region: North West
- Country: England
- Sovereign state: United Kingdom
- Post town: WHITCHURCH
- Postcode district: SY13
- Dialling code: 01948
- UK Parliament: Chester South and Eddisbury

Marbury is a small village in Cheshire East, Cheshire, England. It is the main village in the civil parish of Marbury and District, which also contains the settlements of Norbury, Quoisley and Wirswall. Marbury village lies around 3 miles (5 km) north-east of Whitchurch in Shropshire and 7 miles (11 km) south-west of Nantwich in Cheshire.

The area is agricultural with undulating terrain. Dairy farming is the main industry. The Llangollen Canal runs through the parish, to the north of Marbury village. There are five meres which are important wildlife habitats. Marbury Big Mere is a fishing lake and the Quoisley Meres are a Site of Special Scientific Interest and a Wetland of International Importance; they originate in glacial kettle holes. Marbury contains many historic buildings, the earliest being the 15th-century St Michael's Church. "Marbury Merry Days", a traditional country fair, is held in May. In the Civil War, the parish was plundered by both sides during 1642–44, after Thomas Marbury declared for Parliament.

== History ==
=== Early history ===
Little is known of the history of Marbury before the Norman Conquest. A middle Bronze Age palstave, a type of axe, was found at Bank Farm, near Marbury village; it dates from around 1000–1200 BC. The axe is moulded in two parts, and both faces have a trident design. Roman coins have been found in the area, but there is no evidence of Roman settlement. Parts of two skulls, that of an adult and a child, were recovered from Marbury Big Mere; they have been dated to around 750 AD. A fragment of an unglazed cooking pot considered to be of late Saxon date has also been found in the parish.

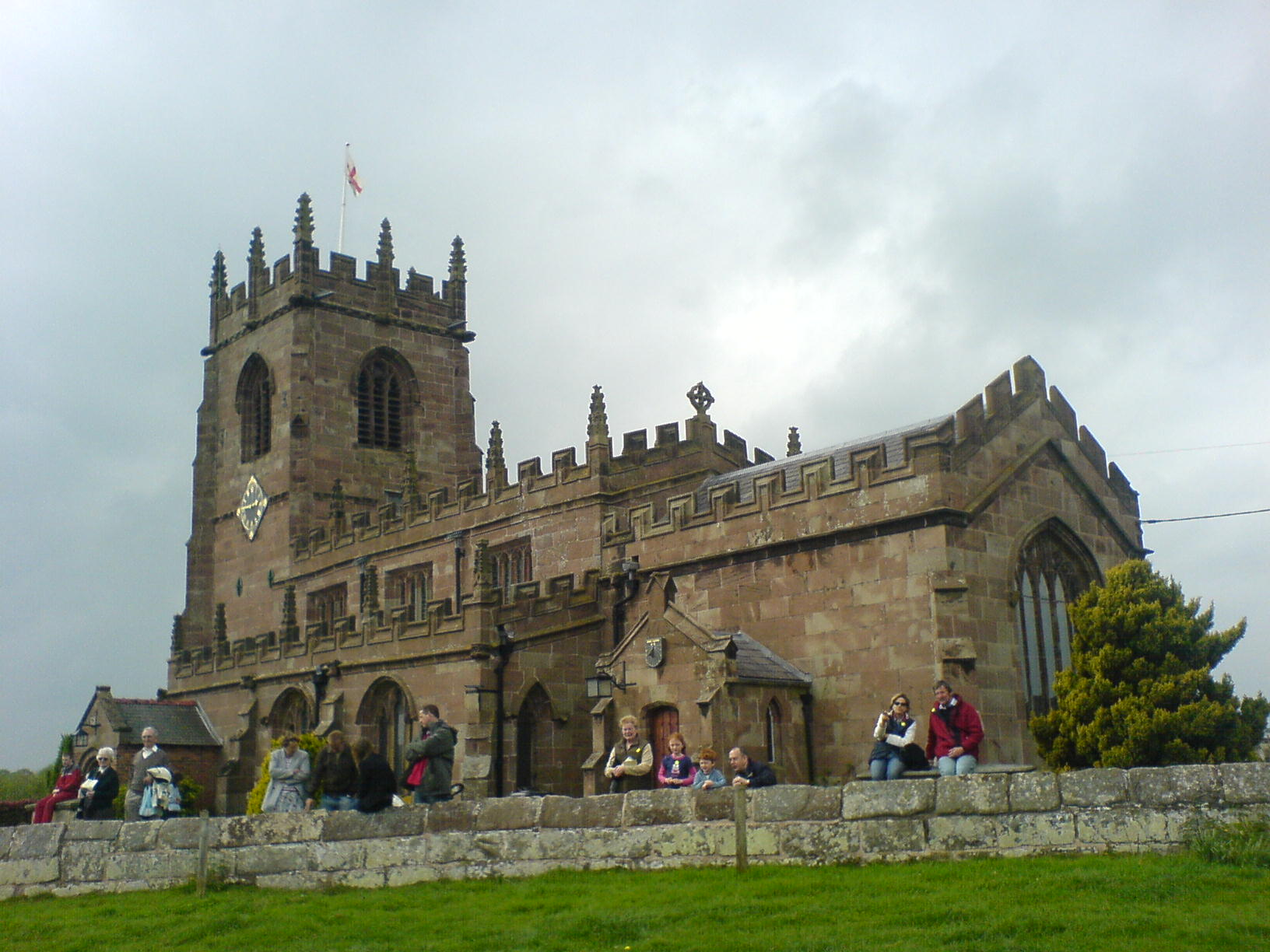
The 15th-century St Michael's stands on the site of an earlier church

Marbury was recorded in the Domesday survey of 1086 as Merberie, jointly with the adjacent townships of Norbury and Wirswall. Before the Conquest, it was held as an outlying estate of Earl Harold, and afterwards by William Malbank, Baron of Nantwich. The Domesday entry records 1½ hides at Marbury; jointly with Norbury and Wirswall, there was land for five ploughs and woodland measuring two leagues by a league and 40 perches. The total population of the joint demesne was recorded as seven. Unlike the adjacent townships of Wirswall and Wrenbury, Marbury is not described as "waste" in the survey. The name Marbury means "a fortified place near a lake"; besides the name, however, no evidence survives of a fortified settlement here. It was within the Hundred of Warmundestrou, later the Nantwich Hundred.

The manor of Marbury was later owned by the de Praers family of Baddiley, passing to John le Strange, Lord of Whitchurch, before 1349. A timber church was in existence in 1299, on the site of the present parish church; Marbury church was considered a parochial chapel of Whitchurch until 1870. The remains of a medieval road were uncovered near Marbury Big Mere during sewerage works. They consist of a brushwood base covered by several layers of logs, with cobbles lying on top of the wood.

Quoisley is first recorded in 1350 as Cuselegh; the name is Anglo-Saxon in origin and means "Cusa's clearing". It might represent a small medieval settlement which was later deserted.

=== Tudor era and the Civil War ===
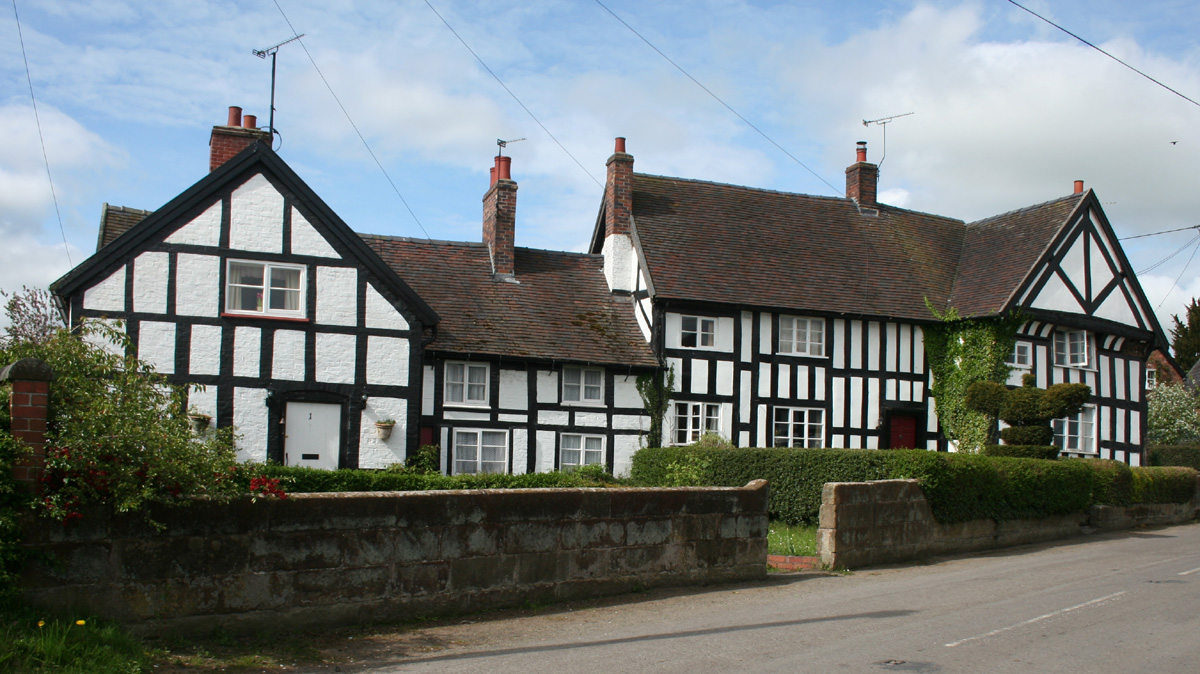
1–4 Black and White Cottages date from the late 16th or early 17th century

In the 15th and 16th centuries, the manor was held by the Earl of Shrewsbury of Marley Hall, later passing to the Earl of Bridgewater. In June 1551, sixteen people in Marbury died in an epidemic of "sweating sickness", perhaps influenza, which also claimed the life of the mayor of Chester, Edmund Gee.

By the 17th century, the Marbury family was a major local landowner. In the Civil War, Thomas Marbury declared for Parliament and raised troops which fought at the Parliamentarian stronghold of Nantwich in 1643–44. In common with much of the countryside surrounding Nantwich, Marbury was plundered by both sides between 1642 and 1644, with the Royalist commander Lord Capell quartering troops in the parish in 1643. Relative peace was restored after the decisive defeat of the Royalists in the Battle of Nantwich of 1644. Thomas Marbury was among several Cheshire Parliamentarians to be pardoned by Charles II in 1651.

A charity school was founded in Marbury churchyard in 1688, and remained on that site until 1824.

=== 18th century to the present day ===
In 1758, the manor of Marbury was purchased by the Knight family, who still held it in 1810. The Poole family gained in influence during the 18th century, and were regarded as the local squires throughout the 19th century until the end of the Second World War. The Pooles inhabited the Jacobean Marbury Old Hall at Tapley's Craft by the church, building the present Marbury Hall in around 1805–10. The Old Hall was unoccupied and partly ruined by 1888, and has now been demolished. Cudworth Halstead Poole served as the High Sheriff of the county in 1880.

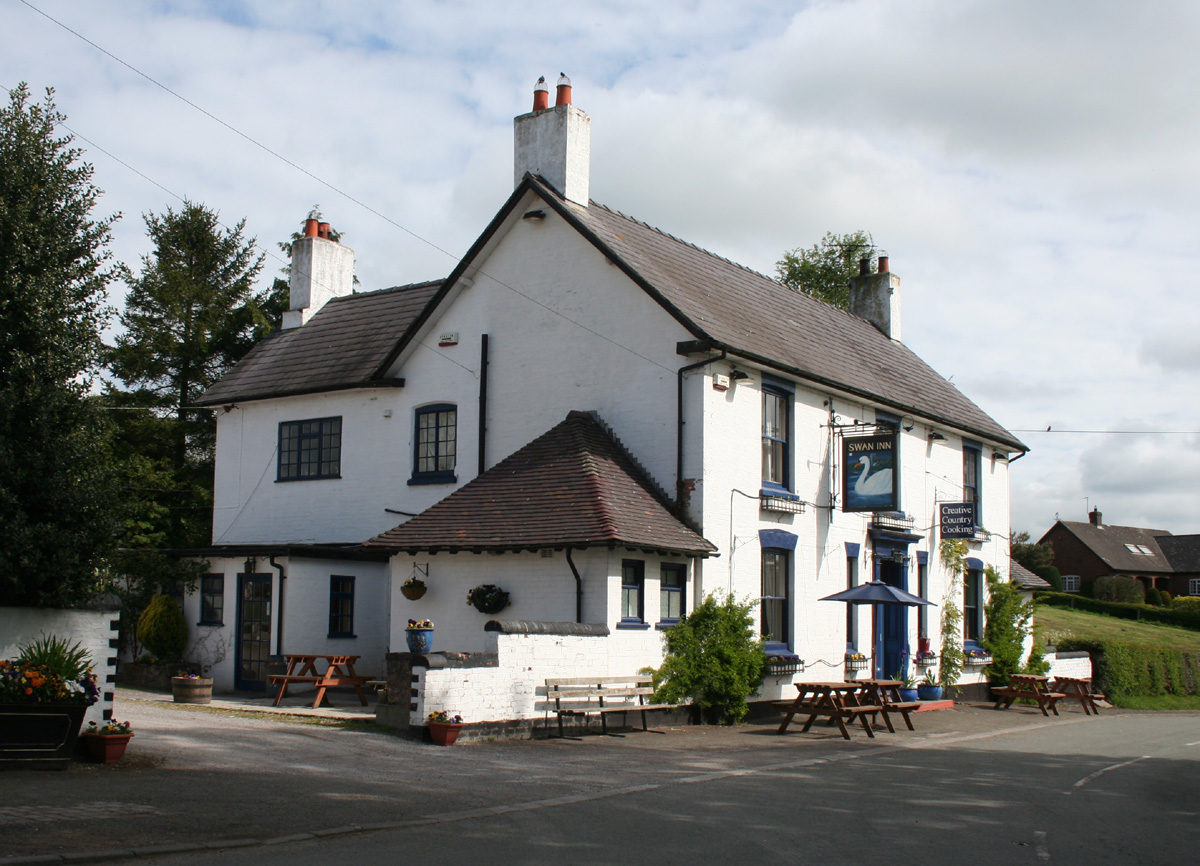
The Swan has been at the centre of Marbury village since the 18th century

In the 1760s, there were two public houses, The Leathern Bottle and The Swan, as well as two licensed sellers of ale. The Leathern Bottle had closed by the end of the 19th century, while The Swan was rebuilt in around 1884 by Cudworth Halstead Poole, and remains open as of 2024. Cudworth Halstead Poole also rebuilt Bank Farm, Marley Lodge and several other buildings in the village. The school had moved to Wrenbury Road in 1825, and a new school opened on School Lane in 1871 on land donated by the Poole family.

Historian George Ormerod described the village in around 1816 as "a cluster of farm-houses, occupying rising ground between two small meres or lakes, from which the township derives its name." Throughout the 19th century, cheesemaking was an important source of income, as in much of South Cheshire. The completion of the Ellesmere Canal early in the 19th century and the Crewe and Shrewsbury Railway in 1858 improved transport for local produce, particularly cheese and milk, to cities including London and Liverpool. In 1850, nearly all local tradespeople were involved with agriculture, whether directly or indirectly. At that date, Marbury had two blacksmiths, butchers and shoemakers, and a wheelwright; later there was also a smithy, coal merchant, tailor, bakehouse and one or more grocer's shops. In the early 20th century, the great majority of the population was still employed in agriculture; one contemporary observer mentioned common occupations as "farm workers, milkmaids and washer women". Cheesemaking had ceased by 1951.

Several descriptions of Marbury village and the surrounding countryside survive from the first half of the 20th century. Ornithologist T. A. Coward wrote around 1900: "What a country this is, wooded hills, none of them high, lanes bordered with luxuriant vegetation that tempts one to potter and smell the honeysuckle or pick the wild roses; meres or pools in almost every hollow." Almost 50 years later, little had changed; local author Beatrice Tunstall described the village in 1948 as "far from the madding crowd", and praised the "ancient lanes, deep trodden by the feet of endless generation, flower fringed amid the woodlands, with great hedges where honeysuckle and wild roses riot."

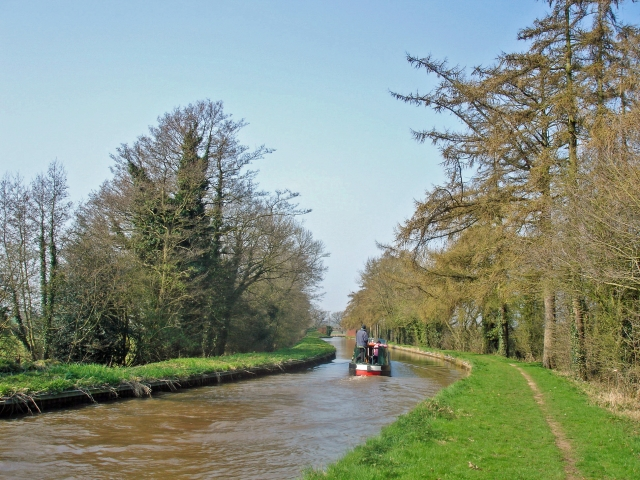
The canal shifted to recreational usage in the late 20th century

A total of 86 men from Marbury served in the First World War; Belgian refugees supplied some of the resulting deficit in agricultural labour. The interwar years saw many services being provided in the area for the first time. A telephone exchange was built in 1927, electricity was connected some time after 1930, and the first bus service started in 1934. In 1929, a village hall was built by the Poole family. The earliest piped water supply was installed at Marbury in around 1930; previously, village pumps on the green were used. During the Second World War, evacuees were housed at Marbury Hall. Marbury was one of the observation posts of the Home Guard, but no bombs are recorded as having fallen within the civil parish.

The Poole estate was sold in 1946. Marbury Hall was acquired by the Grant family, later the Paton-Smiths; Carolin Paton-Smith served as Cheshire's High Sheriff in 2005. Part of the remainder of the estate, including Marbury Little Mere and several farms, passed to the Duchy of Lancaster. Fourteen council houses and a few private houses were built in Marbury village after the Second World War, and in the early 21st century, residential conversion of farm buildings at Marbury Hall Farm created twelve dwellings. Marbury School was extended in 1965, but closed in 1988 due to low enrolment. The second half of the 20th century also saw the loss of many local businesses, with the smithy being demolished in 1979, and the last remaining village shop closing before 1999. The canal ceased being used for commercial traffic after the Second World War, but in the late 20th century became popular for recreation.

== Governance ==
There are two tiers of local government covering Marbury, at parish and unitary authority level: Marbury and District Parish Council and Cheshire East Council. The parish council meets at the village hall on School Lane in Marbury.

=== Administrative history ===
Marbury was an ancient parish in the Nantwich hundred of Cheshire. (Note: Some sources describe Marbury as having been a chapelry in Whitchurch parish. This appears to be on the basis of various 19th century sources from a time when Marbury and Whitchurch were a single benefice sharing their clergy, an arrangement which ended in 1870; contemporary sources nevertheless described Marbury as a separate parish prior to 1870.) The parish was subdivided into two townships, called Marbury cum Quoisley and Norbury. From the 17th century onwards, parishes were gradually given various civil functions under the poor laws, in addition to their original ecclesiastical functions. In some cases, including Marbury, the civil functions were exercised by each township separately rather than the parish as a whole. In 1866, the legal definition of 'parish' was changed to be the areas used for administering the poor laws, and so Marbury cum Quoisley and Norbury became separate civil parishes.

When elected parish and district councils were created under the Local Government Act 1894, Marbury cum Quoisley was given a parish council and included in the Malpas Rural District, subsequently transferring to the Nantwich Rural District in 1936. In 1959, a grouped parish council was created covering the three civil parishes of Marbury cum Quoisley, Norbury, and Wirswall, called the Marbury and District Parish Council. In 2023, the three civil parishes within the group were merged into a single civil parish called Marbury and District.

From 1974 until 2009, at a district level the civil parish formed part of the borough of Crewe and Nantwich. In 2009 the new borough of Cheshire East was created, with its council being a unitary authority, taking over district-level functions from Crewe and Nantwich Borough Council and county-level functions from Cheshire County Council, both of which were abolished.

== Geography and economy ==
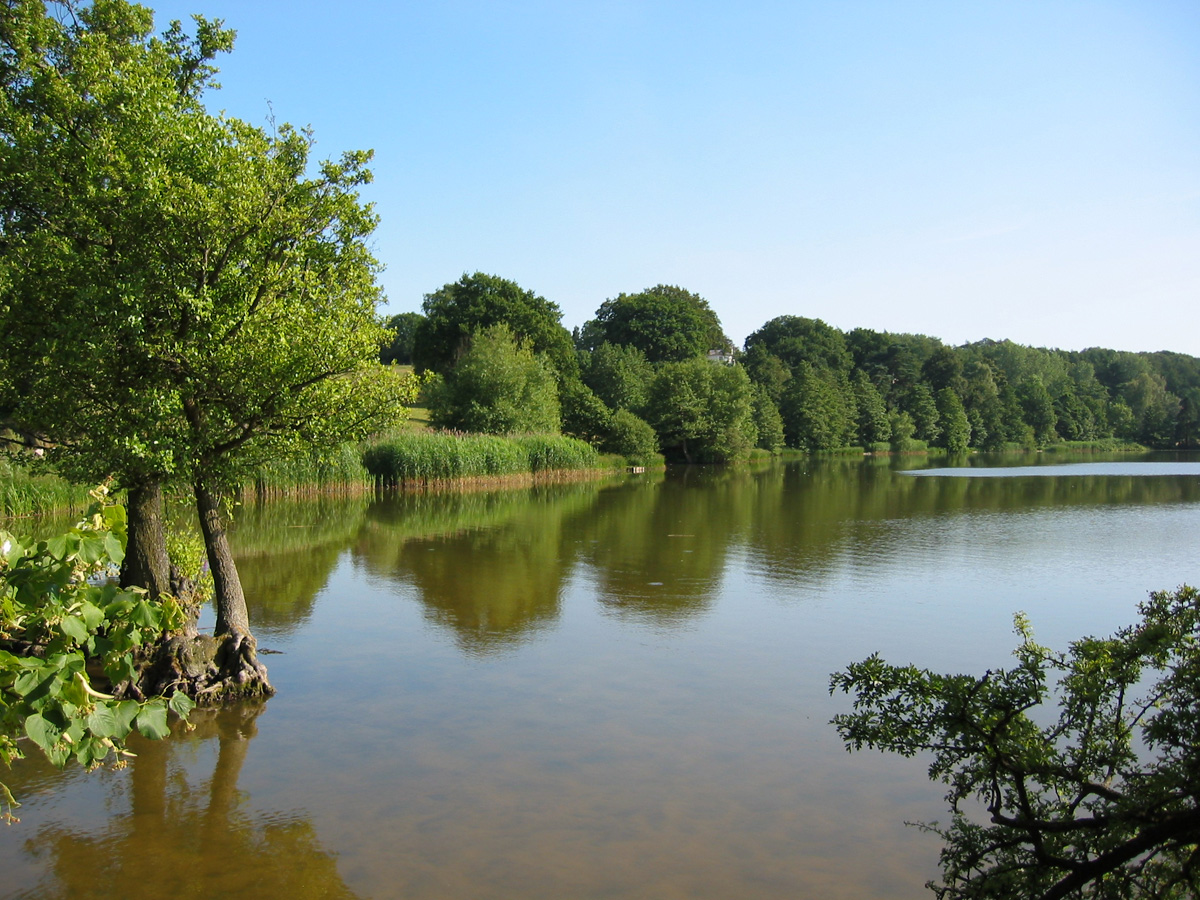
Marbury Big Mere originated as a glacial kettle hole

The civil parish of Marbury and District had a total area of 2,168 acres (877 ha). The terrain is undulating in character, rising from around 75 metres by the Llangollen Canal in the north and west of the parish to around 120 metres near Hollyhurst in the south east. Five sizable meres lay wholly or partly within the civil parish: Marbury Big Mere (SJ559454) and Little Mere (SJ562456), Quoisley Big Mere (SJ546455) and Little Mere (SJ549455), and part of Brankelow Moss (SJ579444). The largest, Marbury Big Mere, is around 500 metres in length. The Marbury and Quoisley Meres originate in glacial kettle holes, formed at the end of the last ice age some ten or fifteen thousand years ago. Additionally, numerous smaller ponds are scattered across the farmland. There were many small areas of woodland including Big Wood, Buttermilk Bank, Glebe Covert, Hadley Covert, Holly Rough, Limepits, Marley Hall Covert, Marley Moss, Poole Gorse, Poole Hook and Square Covert, and parts of Brankelow Moss, Hollyhurst Wood and Poole's Riding Wood.

The Llangollen branch of the Shropshire Union Canal runs along the northern boundary of the parish, with Marbury Brook and Steer Brook running alongside parts of the canal; the canal turns southwards at SJ539463 to form the parish's western boundary. An unnamed brook running from Wirswall Road via Quoisley Meres to the canal forms part of the southern boundary. Church Bridge carries School Lane across Marbury Brook at SJ562464, by Church Bridge Lock in the adjacent civil parish of Norbury. The grade-II-listed red sandstone bridge dates from the late 18th or early 19th century; half of the bridge lies in Marbury cum Quoisley and the other half in Norbury. The modern road bridges of Steer Bridge (Marbury Road) and Quoisley Canal Bridge (A49) cross the canal at SJ553463 and SJ539463, respectively. Quoisley Lock is at SJ538461.

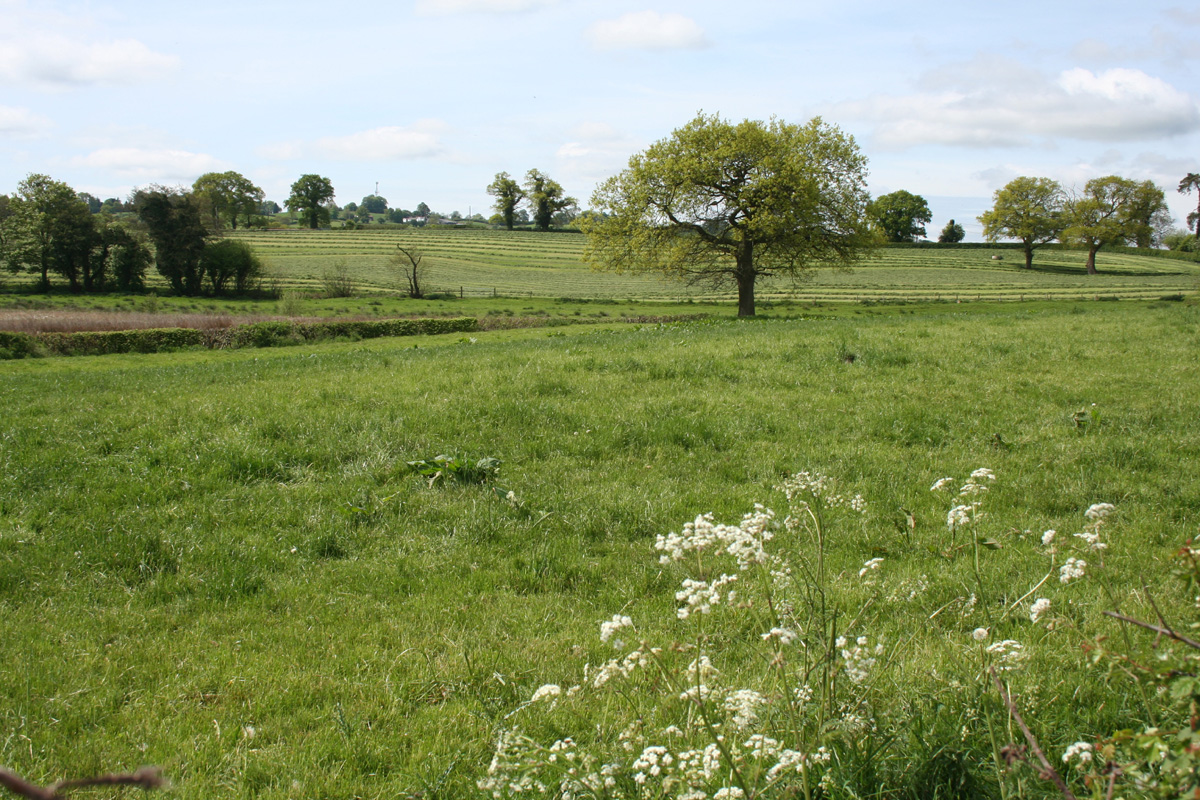
Typical undulating pasture and hay fields between Marbury and Quoisley

The area was predominantly rural, with the major land use being agricultural, mainly dairy. Tourism is also significant, including walking, cycling, fishing and the canal trade. The village of Marbury is centred around the T-junction of Hollins Lane, Wirswall Road and Wrenbury Road at SJ560457, with housing also extending along School Lane.

A large area in the centre and south of the civil parish, including Marbury village and the five meres, forms part of the Wirswall/Marbury/Combermere Area of Special County Value. A small area in the south east falls within the parkland of Combermere Abbey, which is listed in the National Register of Historic Parks and Gardens at grade II. The village of Marbury was designated a conservation area in 1973.

== Ecology ==
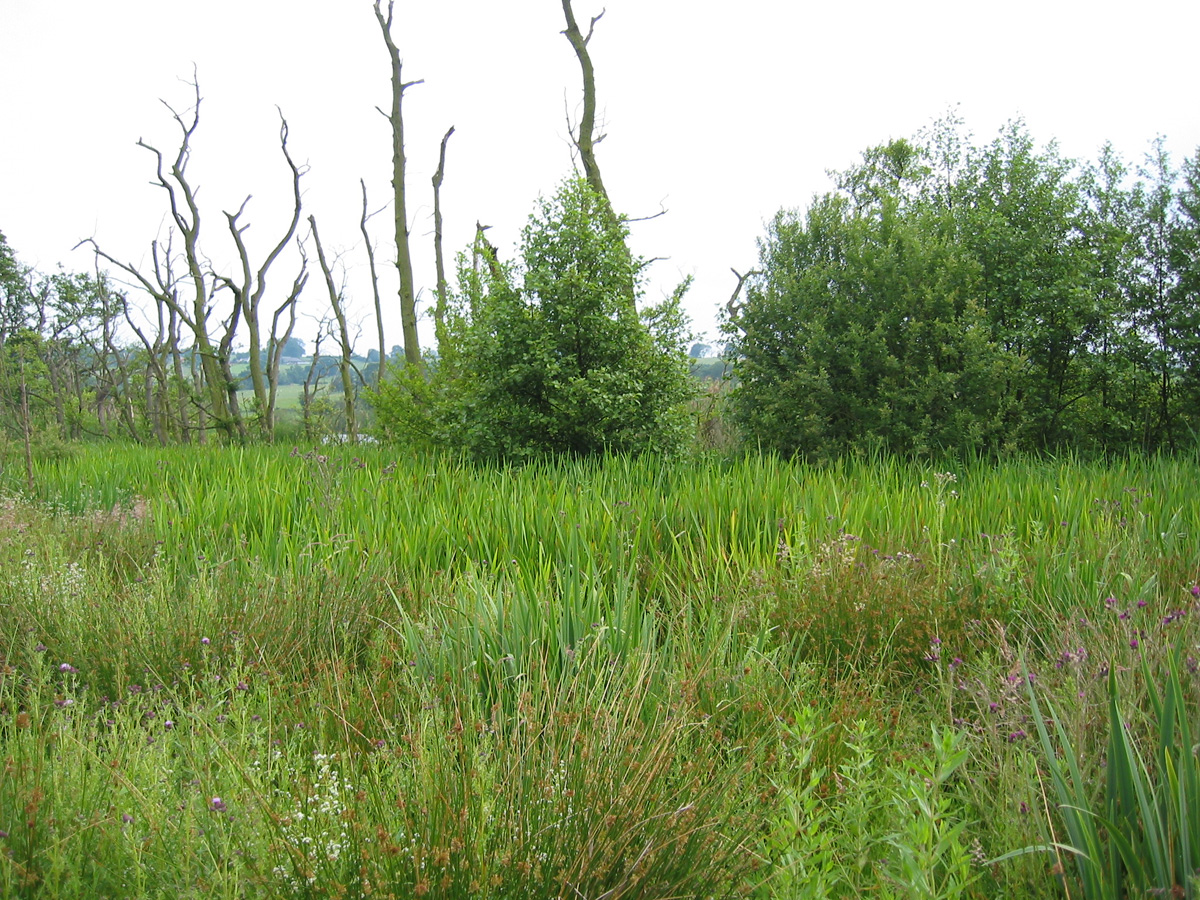
Reed beds at Quoisley Big Mere

The Marbury and Quoisley Meres with their surrounding reed beds form a significant wildlife habitat. Quoisley Meres are a Site of Special Scientific Interest and have also been designated Wetlands of International Importance, as part of the Midland Meres and Mosses Ramsar site. The meres are important for wildfowl; gadwall, garganey and ruddy ducks are among the species observed at Quoisley, with great crested, red-necked and Slavonian grebes, great and little bittern, Canada and pink-footed geese, coots, moorhens and mute swans recorded at Marbury. The woodland across the civil parish also supports birdlife, with nightingale and marsh tit being among the many species recorded here.

Quoisley Meres are important for aquatic invertebrates, and these meres with their surrounding reed beds and damp grassland support over a hundred plant species, including several that are rare in Cheshire. Quoisley Big Mere has a fringe of predominantly alder woodland, while Marbury Little Mere is surrounded by willow. Marbury Big Mere is a private fishing lake run by the Prince Albert Angling Society, with roach, perch, pike, tench, bream, and common and mirror carp being the main species.

== Demography ==
The population of the civil parish has decreased since 1801; the historical population figures are 372 (1801), 355 (1851), 317 (1901) and 291 (1951). The 2001 census recorded a population of 244 in 103 households. In 2006, the total population of the civil parish was estimated as 220.

== Places of worship ==
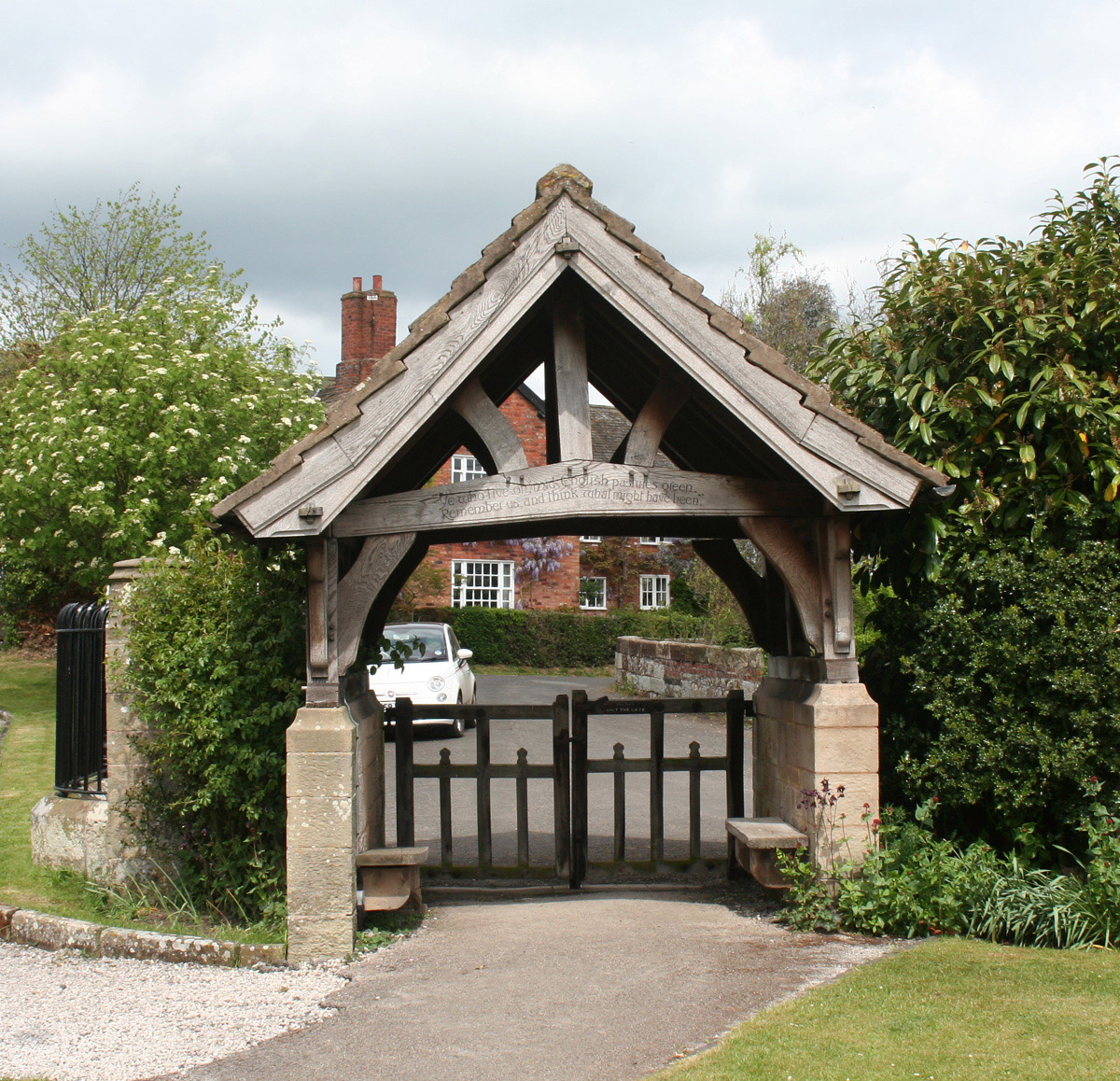
Lychgate at St Michael's

The Anglican parish church of St Michael and All Angels stands on a low rise overlooking Marbury Big Mere. The present red sandstone building dates from the 15th century and is in the perpendicular style; it is listed at grade II*. The church is subject to subsidence, with the tower being 25 inches (64 cm) off the vertical in 1999. The interior contains an octagonal wooden pulpit, which is contemporary with the present church; it is the oldest surviving wooden pulpit in Cheshire. (Note: Richards states second oldest, after that in Mellor, which has been in Greater Manchester since 1974.)

The sandstone churchyard wall dates from the 16th or 17th century and is listed at grade II. Also listed at grade II is the lychgate on Church Lane, which dates from around 1919 and commemorates those who died in the First World War. The rear is inscribed:

Ye who live on mid English pastures green Remember us, and think what might have been.

== Other landmarks ==
=== Marbury village ===
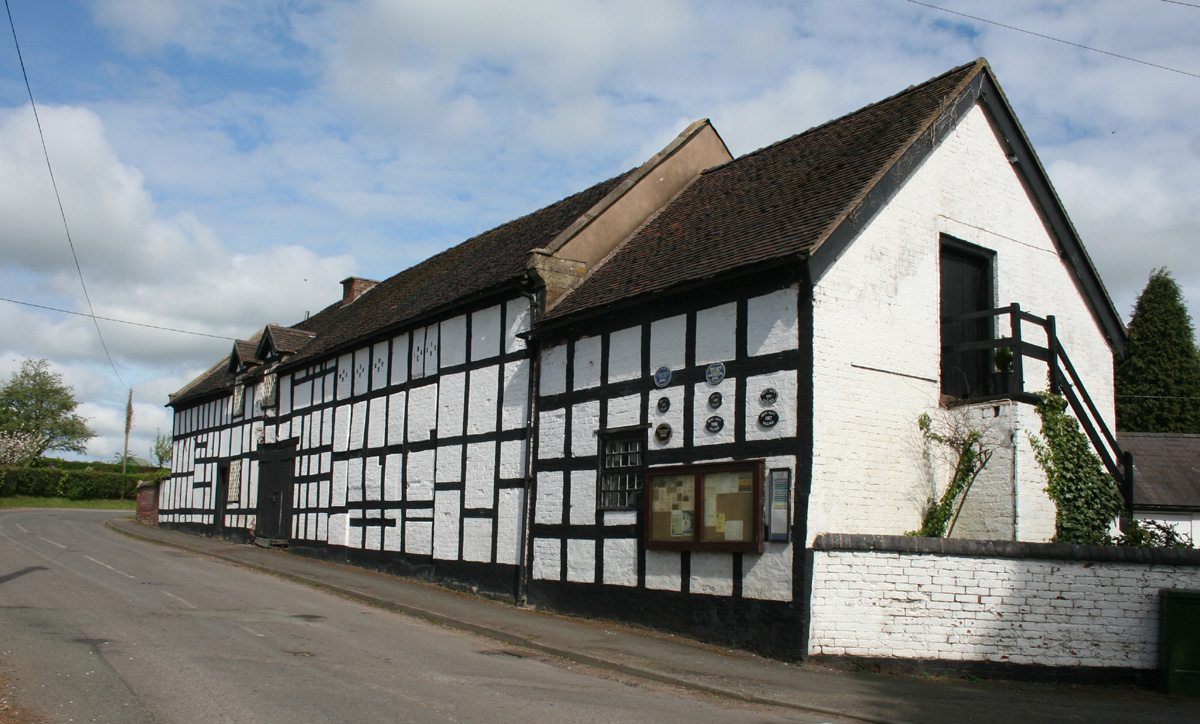
Outhouse by The Swan. The plaques (right) are Marbury's Best Kept Village awards

In the centre is a village green with a mature oak tree, planted in around 1814, but traditionally associated with the Battle of Waterloo of 1815. Marbury Little Mere is adjacent to the green and Big Mere lies to the west of Hollins Lane. Overlooking the green on Wrenbury Road is The Swan, a popular country pub dating originally from 1765, but completely rebuilt in around 1884. The centre of Marbury village is a conservation area. Marbury was the runner up in its category of the Cheshire Community Pride Competition in 2009, and has performed well in past Best Kept Village competitions.

Three timber-framed, black-and-white buildings in the village centre are listed at grade II. Marbury Cottage on Church Lane dates originally from the late 16th or early 17th century and is believed to have formerly been a dower house. The two-storey, T-shaped building has both close studding and small framing with brick infill. Some 17th- and 18th-century doors survive on the interior. On the corner of Church Lane and Wirswall Road stands 1–4 Black and White Cottages, which was once a single house with a service wing, but is now divided into four cottages. The original house dates from the late 16th or early 17th century and features close studding; it has a projecting wing with a jettied gable. The former service wing dates in part from the late 17th or early 18th century, and has some small framing. Finally, a two-storey outhouse on Wirswall Road adjacent to The Swan dates from the 17th century, and features small framing with brick infill.

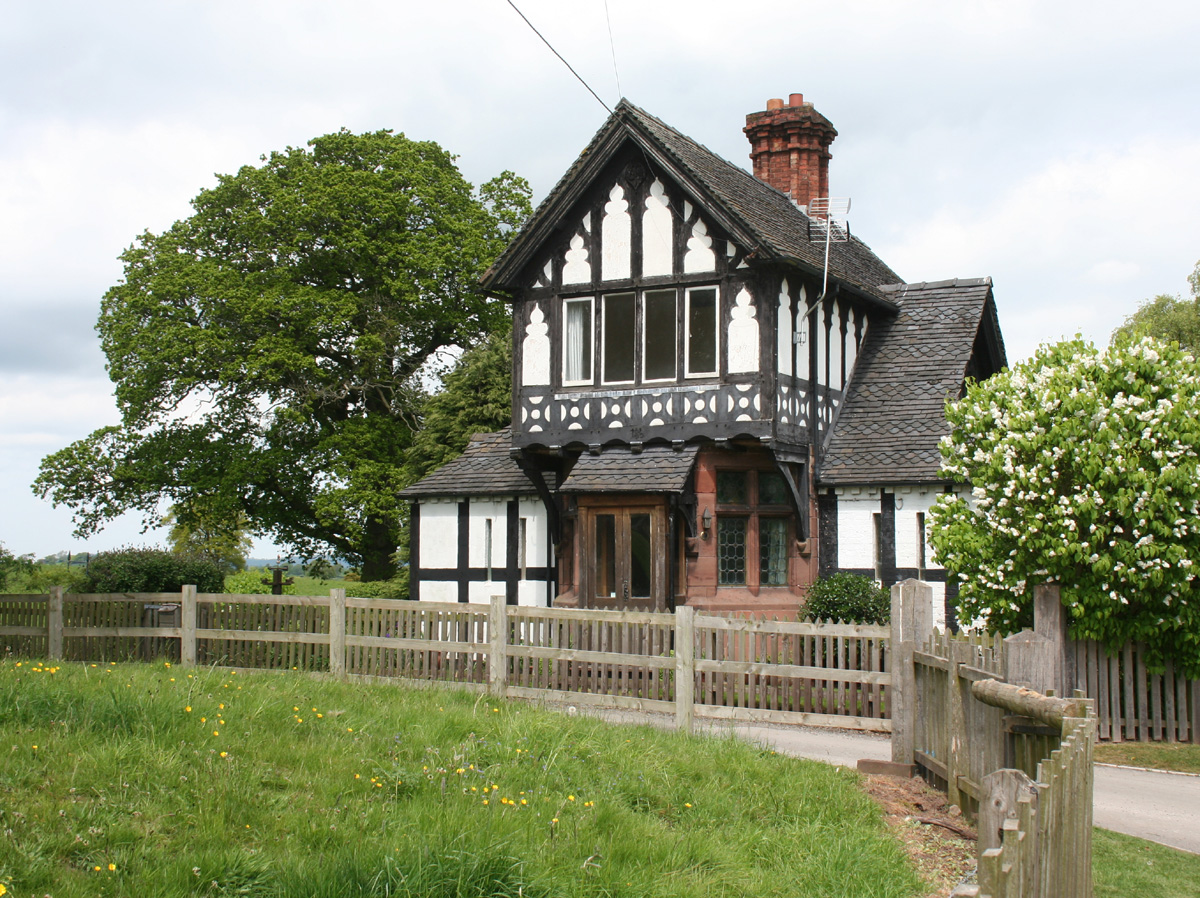
Marbury Hall gatelodge

=== Marbury Hall ===
Marbury Hall is a small Regency hall in white stuccoed brick with stone dressings, located off Hollins Lane at SJ560450, on rising ground overlooking Marbury Big Mere. The entrance front has two bow windows, each three bays wide, flanking a central recessed porch. Built for the Poole family in around 1805–10, the hall is listed at grade II. A timber-framed farmhouse adjacent to the hall dates from the 17th century, and is also listed at grade II.

The grade-II-listed gatelodge, on Hollins Lane at SJ564451, dates from 1876 and is thought to be by Thomas Lockwood. Timber framed in red sandstone and brick, the lodge features decorative framing and has a jettied bay. Architecture writers Peter de Figueiredo and Julian Treuherz describe it as "pretty", with "playful" ornamentation.

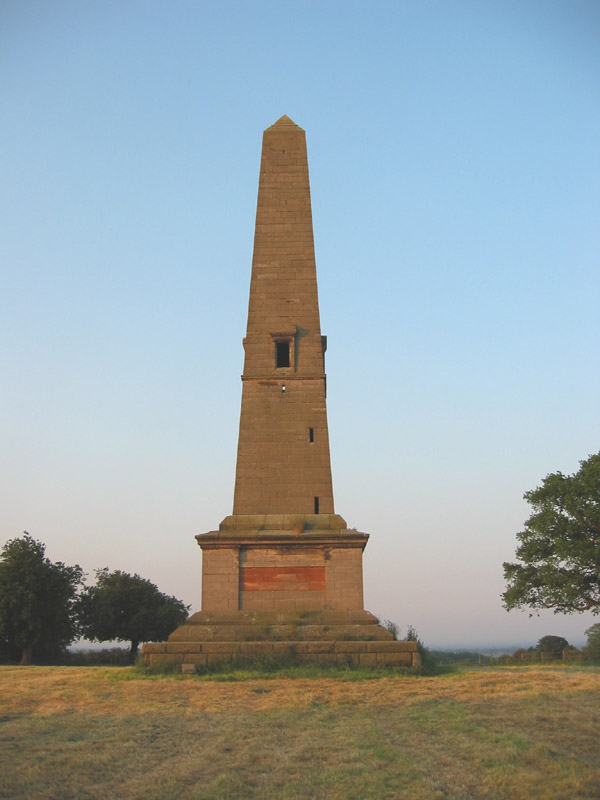
Combermere Park obelisk

=== Elsewhere ===
Hadley Hall, on Wirswall Road at SJ557461, is a grade-II-listed, timber-framed farmhouse with red brick infill, originally dating from the 16th century. It has two gabled end bays, one of which features close studding. Also on Wirswall Road is a group of estate cottages which, as of 2010, are under consideration as locally important buildings.

A sandstone obelisk stands on a rise at the edge of the Combermere estate at SJ575447, near the high point of the civil parish. It was erected in 1890 to commemorate Field Marshal Stapleton Cotton, the first Viscount Combermere (1773–1865), under the terms of his widow's will. Lord Combermere, of nearby Combermere Abbey, had a long and distinguished military career, the pinnacle of which was his taking the fort of Bharatpur in 1825; other successes include his service during the Peninsular War and at the Battle of Salamanca.

The obelisk is around 20 metres (66 feet) high, with window mouldings approximately halfway up each side. The base has inset panels of red sandstone on each face; one has a doorway, while the opposite one bears the Cotton coat of arms and a memorial inscription. The design is similar to Sir Robert Smirke's monument to the Duke of Wellington, Lord Combermere's former commanding officer, in Phoenix Park, Dublin. The obelisk is listed at grade II.

== Transport ==
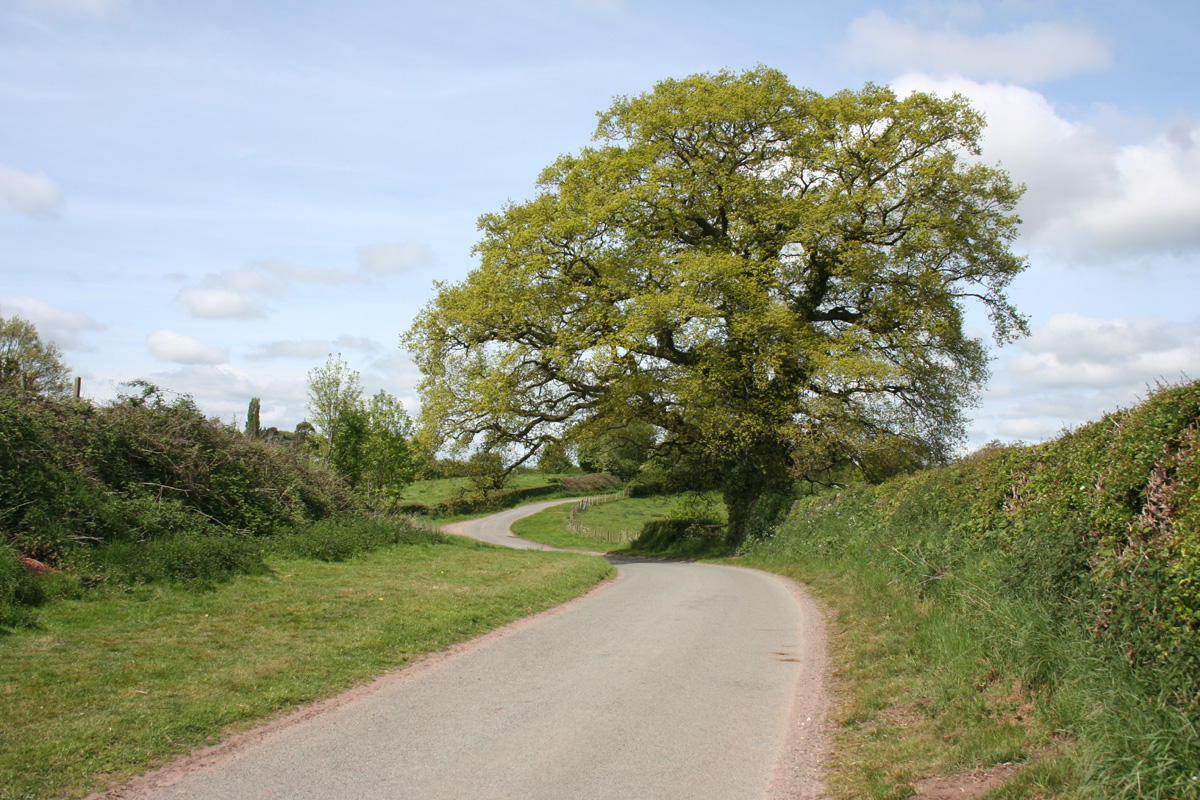
The narrow, winding Wirswall Road is a major local route

The civil parish is served by a network of unclassified minor roads, predominantly single-track country lanes. From Marbury village, Wirswall Road runs north to near the canal then turns south and runs through Quoisley to Wirswall; Hollins Lane runs south to Whitchurch; Wrenbury Road runs east through Marley Green to Wrenbury; and School Lane runs northwards from Wirswall Road across the canal to Norbury. Hollyhurst Road branches from Hollins Lane and joins Wrenbury Road near Pinsley Green; Marbury Road branches from Wirswall Road, crosses the canal and leads to Norbury. The A49 trunk road runs north–south by the western boundary of the civil parish, but does not connect with this network of lanes.

The Welsh Marches railway line runs through the civil parish from the north east to the south west; the nearest stations are Wrenbury and Whitchurch. National Cycle Network Regional Route 45 follows Hollyhurst Road, while Regional Route 70 follows School Lane and Marbury Road. The South Cheshire Way long-distance footpath runs from the north east to the south west of the parish.

== Education ==
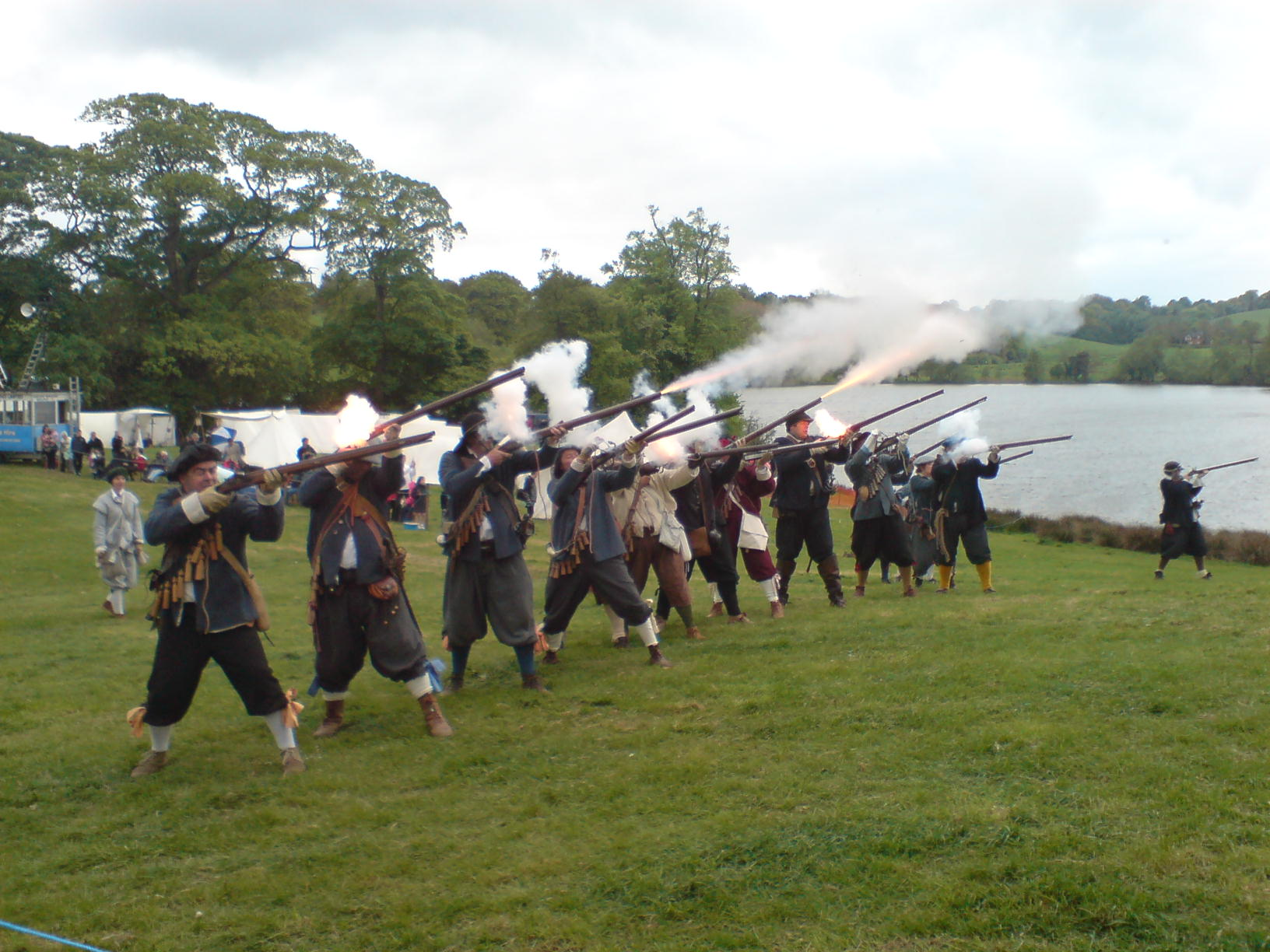
Historical reenactment at the 2009 Merry Days

Since the closure of Marbury-Cum-Quoisley Church of England School in 1988, there have been no educational facilities within the civil parish. Marbury cum Quoisley falls within the catchment areas of Wrenbury Primary School in Wrenbury, and Brine Leas High School in Nantwich.

== Marbury Merry Days ==
A traditional country fair, "Marbury Merry Days", is held annually, usually on the second weekend of May, beside Marbury Big Mere. It lasts for two days and all proceeds are donated to maintaining the church. Inaugurated in 1978 by the Reverend John Wright to raise money for church restoration, by 1996 the fair was raising an annual sum of around £7000; in 2009 it raised £12,800. At past fairs, entertainments have included displays of farm machinery, vintage cars and motor cycles, and model railways and aircraft, as well as historical reenactments, puppet shows, clay pigeon shooting, raft and cross country races, sheepdog trials and other dog displays.

== See also ==
- Listed buildings in Marbury cum Quoisley

== References and notes ==
=== Sources ===
- Dore RN. The Civil Wars in Cheshire. A History of Cheshire, Vol. 8 (JJ Bagley, ed.) (Cheshire Community Council; 1966)
- Local History Group, Latham FA (ed.). Wrenbury and Marbury (The Local History Group; 1999) (ISBN 0 9522284 5 9)
