= Rostherne Mere =

Lake in Cheshire, England

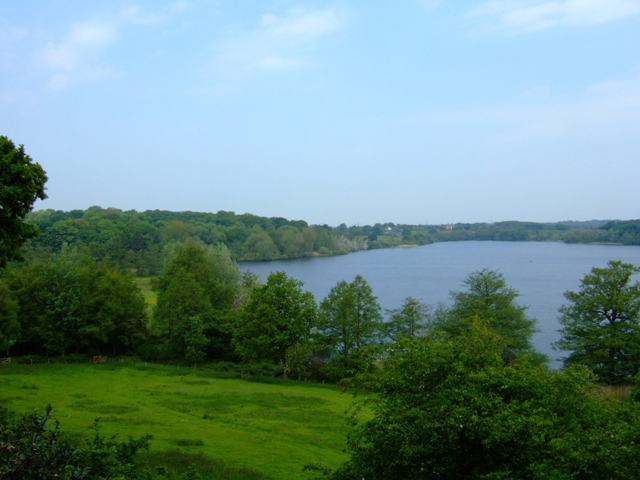
- View across the mere

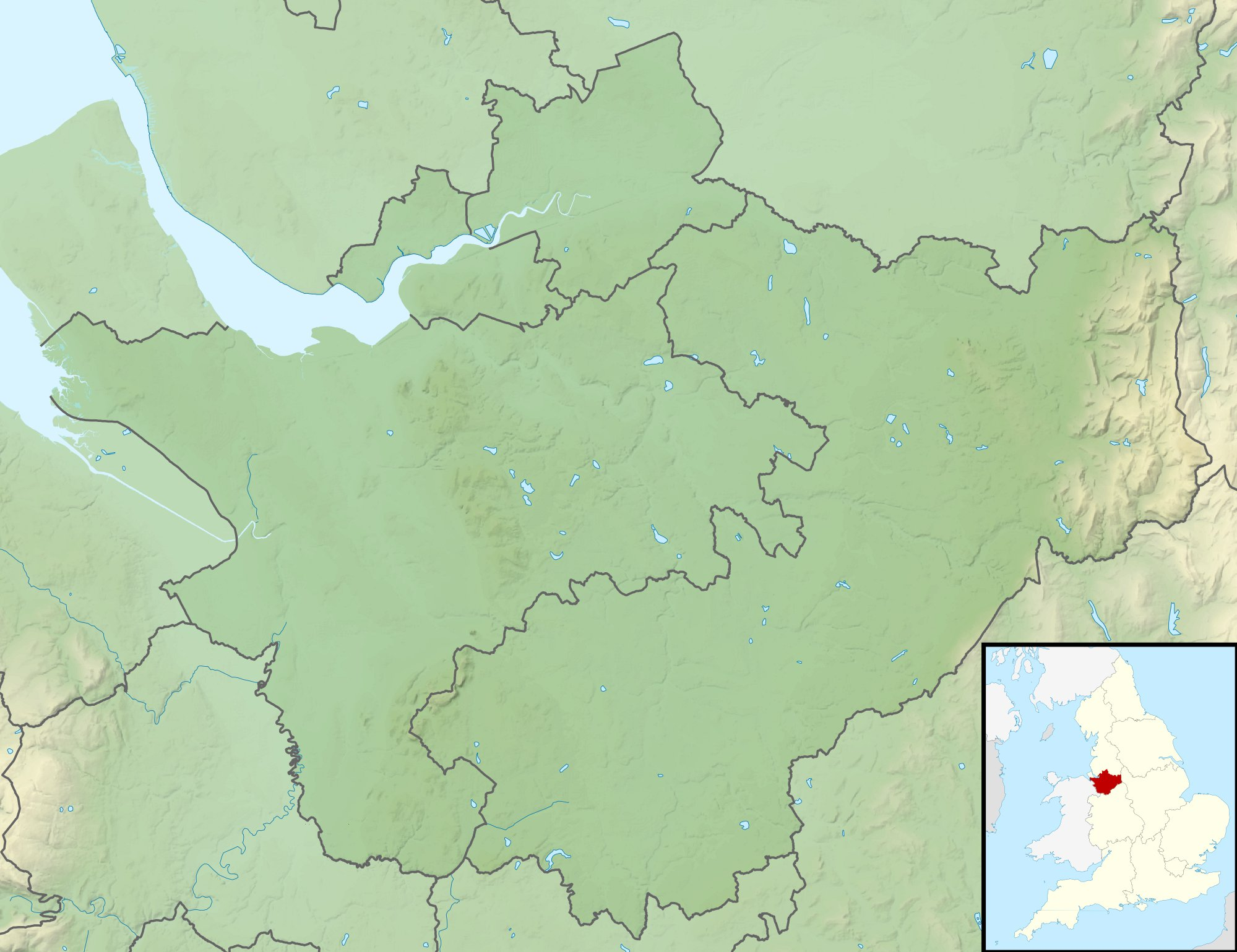
- Location within Cheshire
- Location: Cheshire
- Coordinates: 53.354°N 2.387°W
- Basin countries: United Kingdom
- Surface area: 48 ha (120 acres)
- Average depth: 30 m (98 ft)

Ramsar Wetland
- Designated: 24 July 1981
- Reference no.: 221

Rostherne Mere is a natural lake in Cheshire, England. It is the largest of the Cheshire meres with an area of 48 hectares (120 acres) and a maximum depth of 30 metres (98 ft). It lies north of Rostherne village and south of the M56 motorway. Because of its importance for wildlife, the lake, together with neighbouring areas of woodland and pasture, has been declared a national nature reserve, a Ramsar site and a Site of Special Scientific Interest covering 152.9 hectares (378 acres).

== Geography ==
The lake lies on thick sedimentary deposits of glacial origin above marl and salt-beds. It was probably formed by a combination of retreating glaciers creating a kettle hole and subsidence caused by the underlying rock salt dissolving away. The lake is fertile and base-rich with high levels of phosphate, nitrate and ammonia. Nutrient levels have risen as a result of inflow from surrounding farmland and streams and because of the droppings from large numbers of roosting birds.

== Wildlife ==
Large numbers of ducks winter on the lake including tufted duck, pochard, goldeneye, teal and wigeon. Roosting birds include up to 10,000 black-headed gulls, 1000 common gulls and 300 cormorants. Breeding birds include great crested grebe, reed warbler and sedge warbler, while lesser spotted woodpecker and little owl occur in the surrounding area.

The reserve has a variety of butterfly species including white-letter hairstreak, purple hairstreak and common blue. There are few invertebrates in the deeper parts of the lake but shallower areas are home to various gastropod molluscs and leeches.

The lake lacks submerged vegetation but has floating beds of yellow water-lily and white water-lily. Around the edge are areas of birch and willow and reedbeds with common reed, lesser reedmace and sweet flag. The woodland consists mainly of oak and has patches of wood sorrel, yellow archangel and early purple orchid at ground level.

== Folklore ==
According to legend, Rostherne Mere is the home of a mermaid, who can sometimes be heard ringing a sunken bell beneath the water.
