= Lord Mark Kerr (British Army officer, born 1676) =

Scottish-born professional soldier

General Lord Mark Kerr
- Born: 1 April 1676 (baptismal date); Newbattle, Midlothian
- Died: 2 February 1752; Kensington, London
- Burial place: St Mary Abbots, Kensington
- Military career
- Allegiance: Scotland 1685–1707 (United Kingdom) Great Britain 1707–1713
- Branch: Army
- Service years: 1694–1719 (Active service)
- Rank: General
- Units: 29th Foot; 13th Foot; 11th Hussars
- Commands: Commander, Counties Down and Antrim, 1716;
- Conflicts: War of the Spanish Succession 1702–1714; Almansa, 1707; War of the Quadruple Alliance; Capture of Vigo, 1719
- Other work: Governor of Carrickfergus 1716; Governor of Sheerness 1729; Governor, Berwick-upon-Tweed; Governor of Edinburgh Castle 1745-1752

Lord Mark Kerr (baptised 1 April 1676 – 2 February 1752) was a Scottish-born professional soldier, who served in the War of the Spanish Succession and the War of the Quadruple Alliance. He reached the rank of General in the British Army, and held a number of important administration posts, including Governor of Edinburgh Castle.

== Life ==
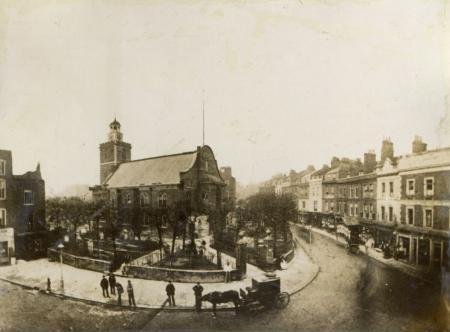
Kerr was buried in St Mary Abbots, Kensington, shown here in 1869, shortly before its demolition

Lord Mark Kerr was born in 1676, fourth son of Robert Kerr, 1st Marquis of Lothian (1636–1703) and his wife, Jean Campbell (d. 1700), daughter of Archibald Campbell, 1st Marquess of Argyll. Through their relationship with Argyll, the family was closely associated with Presbyterian and Whig interests and supported the 1688 Glorious Revolution.

He never married and died in London on 2 February 1752. He was buried in St Mary Abbots, Kensington, the memorial being lost when the church was rebuilt in 1878.

== Career ==
In 1696, Kerr was commissioned Captain in 'McGill's Regiment of Foot;' this was disbanded in 1697 following the Treaty of Ryswick and he transferred to Lord Jedburgh's Dragoons, a regiment owned by his eldest brother.

When the War of the Spanish Succession began in 1702, he joined George Macartney's Regiment of Foot, which served in Flanders; in January 1706, he became Colonel of a newly recruited unit, Lord Mark Kerr's Regiment of Foot. Sent to Spain to support the Hapsburg candidate, Archduke Charles, it fought in the April, 1707 Battle of Almansa. The Anglo-Portuguese infantry were left isolated when their cavalry was routed and Kerr was wounded, while his regiment suffered severe losses. With the bulk of the surviving infantry, they retreated in good order to a defensive position 8 miles/12 kilometres from the battlefield. Out of ammunition, food and water, they surrendered the next day and the opposing commander, the Duke of Berwick, illegitimate son of James II of England, invited the captured officers to dinner.

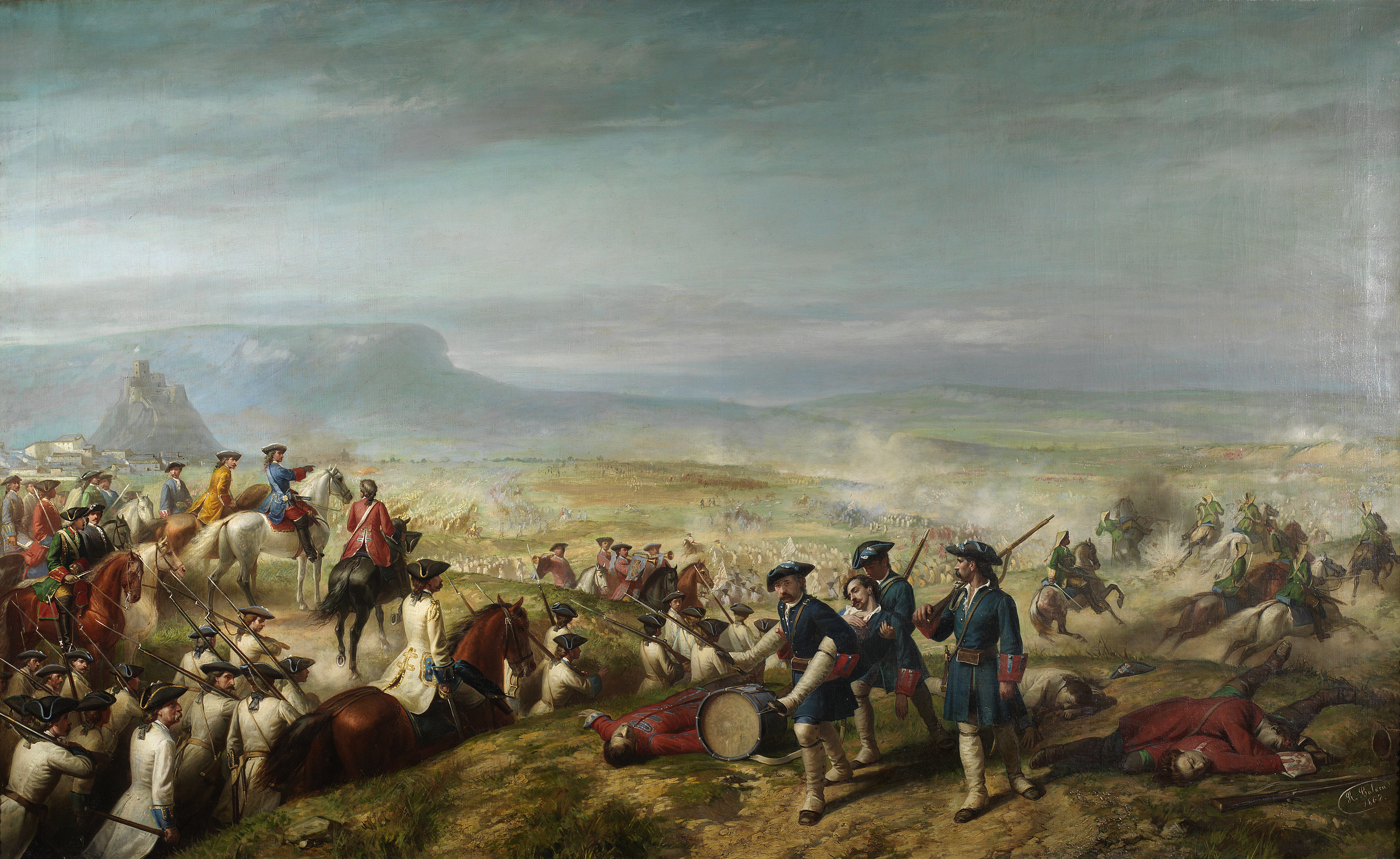
Almansa, April 1707; a decisive Bourbon victory, Kerr's regiment suffered heavy casualties, with many others taken prisoner

Their losses at Almansa meant the regiment was reformed in 1709 and disbanded two years later, as part of the reductions passed by the Tory government installed after the 1710 British General Election. Kerr was promoted Brigadier-General, but his juniors officers placed on half-pay; several of these, including Philip Lockhart and John Nairne, later joined the 1715 Jacobite Rising.

Following the death of Thomas Farrington in October 1712, Kerr became Colonel of his regiment, Farrington's, later 29th Foot; this was sent to Gibraltar, where it remained for the next 30 years. Kerr may not have joined his regiment there, as in 1716 he was appointed Governor of Carrickfergus, and military commander for Counties Down and Antrim.

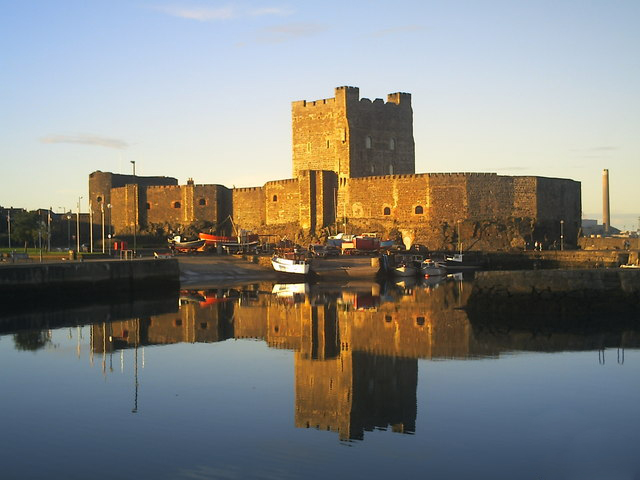
Carrickfergus Castle; Kerr was based here as Governor in 1716

During the War of the Quadruple Alliance, the Spanish supported the 1719 Jacobite Rising, which was quickly crushed. In retaliation, a British naval expedition under Lord Cobham landed 6,000 troops in the Spanish port of Vigo in October; they held it for ten days, destroyed vast quantities of stores and equipment, then re-embarked unopposed. Kerr commanded part of the landing force, which appears to have been his last active service command. In this period, the position of 'Colonel' implied ownership, not necessarily command and many delegated their duties to a subordinate.

Kerr became Colonel of Stanhope's, later the 13th Regiment of Foot in 1725, made Major-General in 1727 and Governor of Sheerness in 1729. In 1732, he transferred his Colonelcy to Philip Honywood's Dragoons, later 11th Hussars, promoted Lieutenant-General in 1735, then full General on 26 February 1743.

When the 1745 Jacobite Rising began in August 1745, he was Governor, Berwick-upon-Tweed. He reportedly joked Sir John Cope, defeated at the Battle of Prestonpans in September, was the first general to bring news of his own defeat but this seems to have been a later invention by the author Sir Walter Scott. Kerr was appointed Governor of Edinburgh Castle when government forces under General Handasyde retook the city on 14 November. Commanding a regiment of dragoons, Lord Kerr's dragoons he pursued the Jacobite forces on their retreat back into Scotland in December 1745, including the ensuring Clifton Moor Skirmish.

He died in London in 1752.

Military offices
Preceded by Thomas Farrington	Colonel Lord Mark Kerr's Regiment, later 29th Foot; 1712–1725	Succeeded by Henry Disney
Unknown	Governor of Carrickfergus; 1716–?	Unknown
Preceded by Stanhope Cotton	Colonel Lord Mark Kerr's Regiment, later 13th Foot; 1725–1732	Succeeded by John Middleton
Preceded by Henry Withers	Governor of Sheerness; 1729–1745	Succeeded by John Huske
Preceded by Sir Philip Honywood	Colonel Lord Mark Kerr's Dragoons, later 11th Hussars; 1732–1752	Succeeded by William Kerr, 4th Marquess of Lothian
Preceded by Sir James Campbell	Governor of Edinburgh Castle; 1745–1752	Succeeded by Humphrey Bland
