= Hugh Campbell, 3rd Earl of Loudoun =

Scottish landowner, peer and statesman

The Right Honourable The Earl of Loudoun KT PC

Scottish representative peer
- In office 13 February 1707 – 20 November 1731

Lord Keeper of the Great Seal of Scotland
- In office 1708–1713
- Preceded by: Inaugural holder
- Succeeded by: The 4th Earl of Findlater

Secretary of State of Scotland
- In office 5 June 1705 – 25 May 1708
- Preceded by: The Marquess of Annandale
- Succeeded by: The Earl of Mar

Commissioner of the Treasury
- In office 1703–1705

Personal details
- Born: c. 1675
- Died: 20 November 1731 (aged 55–56)
- Spouse: Lady Margaret Dalrymple
- Children: 2, including John
- Parent(s): James Campbell, 2nd Earl of Loudoun; Lady Margaret Montgomerie
- Relatives: Sir James Campbell (brother); James Mure-Campbell, 5th Earl of Loudoun (nephew)

Military service
- Battles/wars: Battle of Sheriffmuir

Hugh Campbell, 3rd Earl of Loudoun, KT, PC (c. 1675 – 20 November 1731) was a Scottish landowner, peer, and statesman.

With the Earl of Mar, Loudoun was the last Secretary of State of the Kingdom of Scotland. He supported the Union with England of 1707 and was Lord Keeper of the Great Seal of Scotland between 1708 and 1713.

== Early life and family ==
Campbell was the oldest son of James Campbell, 2nd Earl of Loudoun, by his marriage to Lady Margaret Montgomerie, a daughter of Hugh Montgomerie, 7th Earl of Eglinton.

In 1684, he succeeded his father as Earl of Loudoun, Lord Campbell of Loudoun, and Lord Tarrinzean and Mauchline, which gave him a seat in the unicameral Parliament of Scotland as soon as he came of age. While his year of birth is unknown, it can be estimated from the fact that he took his seat on 8 September 1696 and would normally have done so at the age of twenty-one.

Loudoun’s brother, Colonel John Campbell, was a Whig Member of Parliament for Ayrshire before the Union of 1707, as was another brother, Sir James Campbell, after it. Sir James married Lady Jane Boyle, a daughter of David Boyle, 1st Earl of Glasgow, was Colonel of the Scots Greys and a Knight of the Order of the Bath, and was killed at the Battle of Fontenoy (1745). His brother James's son James Mure-Campbell eventually became the 5th Earl of Loudoun.

== Career ==
In April 1697, Loudoun was appointed a Privy Councillor for Scotland. From February 1699 until his death, he was also an Extraordinary Lord of Session, having been appointed at an unusually early age. In recommending Loudoun for the Court of Session, the Earl of Argyll wrote to William Carstares

"Pray, let not E. Melvill's unreasonable pretending to the vacant gown make you slack as to E. Loudon, who, though a younger man, is an older and more noted presbyterian than he. Loudon has it in his blood, and it is a mettled young fellow, that those who recommend him will gain honour by him. He has a deal of natural parts and sharpness, a good stock of clergy, and by being in business he will daily improve"

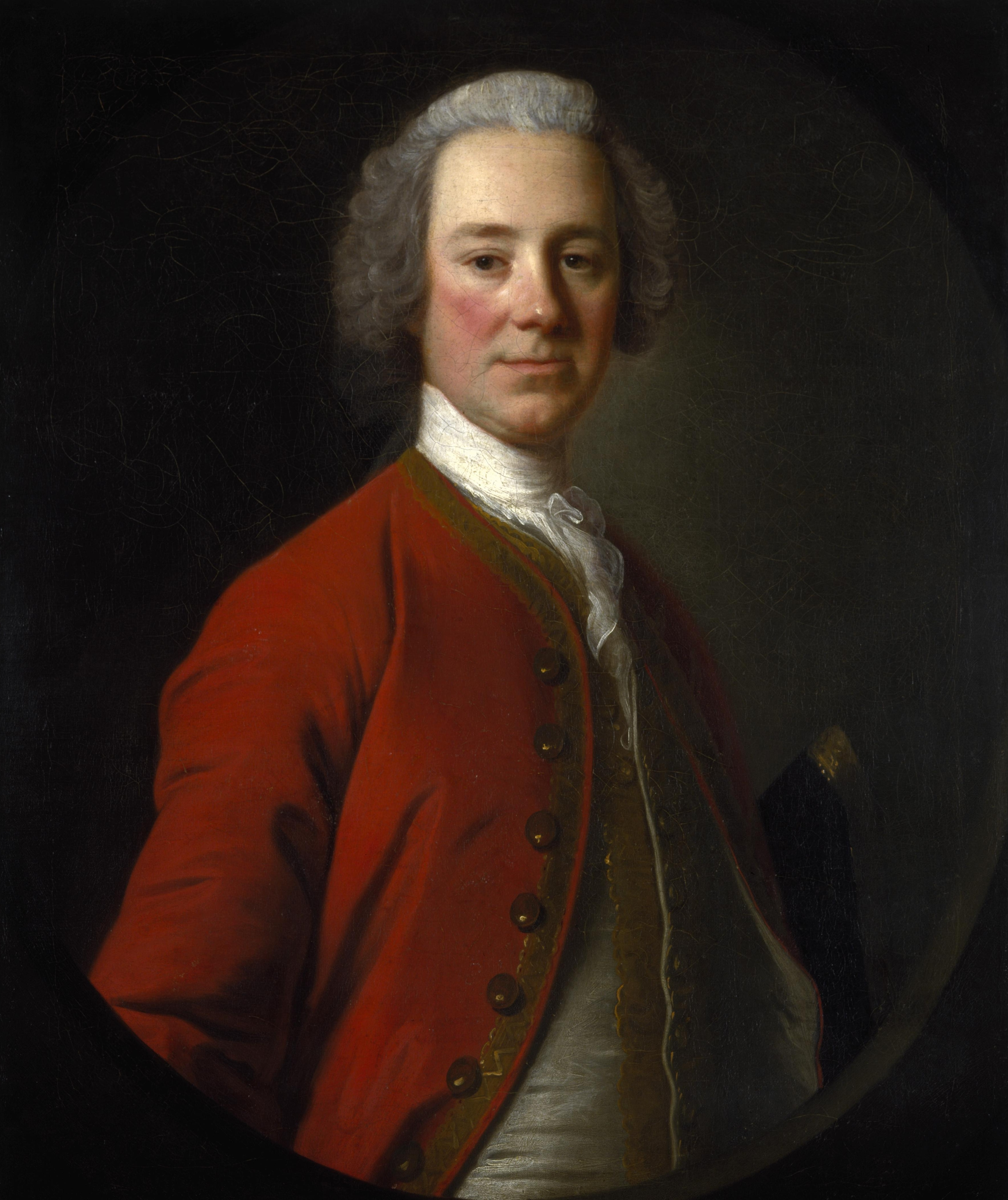
Loudoun's son John

From 1703 to 1705 Loudoun was a Commissioner of the Treasury, then from 1705 to 1707 Secretary of State of the Kingdom of Scotland, holding the office jointly with John Erskine, Earl of Mar, the two men becoming the last holders of that office before the Acts of Union 1707 combined England and Scotland into a single Kingdom of Great Britain. In 1706, he was appointed a Knight of the Order of the Thistle. On 26 October of that year he wrote to Sidney Godolphin, Earl of Godolphin, that "manie of the common people are so much impos'd on us to be against the union in manie places of the Countrie," but he believed that the benefits it would bring would ultimately pacify the dissenting voices. From 1707 he was a Scottish representative peer, with a seat in the House of Lords at Westminster. Loudoun was Lord Keeper of the Great Seal of Scotland between 1708 and 1713. In 1715, he fought at the Battle of Sheriffmuir, taking the side of King George I against the Jacobites.

== Personal life ==
On 6 April 1700, Loudoun married his cousin, Lady Margaret Dalrymple (c. 1677–1777), a daughter of John Dalrymple, 1st Earl of Stair and Elizabeth Dundas, daughter and heiress of Sir John Dundas of Newliston. They had a daughter and a son:

- Lady Margaret Campbell, who on 4 August 1728 married John Campbell of Shawfield, son and heir of Daniel Campbell, but died childless on 7 October 1733.
- John Campbell, 4th Earl of Loudoun (1705–1782).

On 7 February 1707, Loudoun's peerages were regranted by the Crown, with new remainders to the heirs general of the first Earl of his own nomination, and in default of that to the heirs male. He died on 20 November 1731 and was succeeded by his son John.

On a visit to Scotland, Dr Samuel Johnson met Loudoun's widow in old age and says of her "I was introduced to two ladies of high quality, one of whom (Lady Loudoun) in her ninety-fourth year presided at her table with the full exercise of all her powers..."

== Coat of arms ==
Coat of arms of Hugh Campbell, 3rd Earl of Loudoun
Coronet A coronet of an Earl Crest An eagle with two necks displayed gules in a flame of fire proper. Escutcheon Gyronny of eight ermine and gules. Supporters Dexter: an armed man bearing a pick on his shoulder proper; Sinister: a lady richly attired with a signet letter in her sinister hand proper. Motto l byde my tyme

== Notes ==
Peerage of Scotland
Preceded by James Campbell	Earl of Loudoun; 1684–1731	Succeeded by John Campbell
