= Philip Honywood =

Philip Honywood may refer to:

- Philip Honywood (British Army officer, died 1752) (c. 1677–1752), British Army officer
- Philip Honywood (British Army officer, died 1785) (c. 1710–1785), his nephew, British Army officer and Member of Parliament
