= James Campbell (British Army officer, died 1745) =

British army officer and politician (1680–1745)

Lieutenant-General Sir James Campbell KB
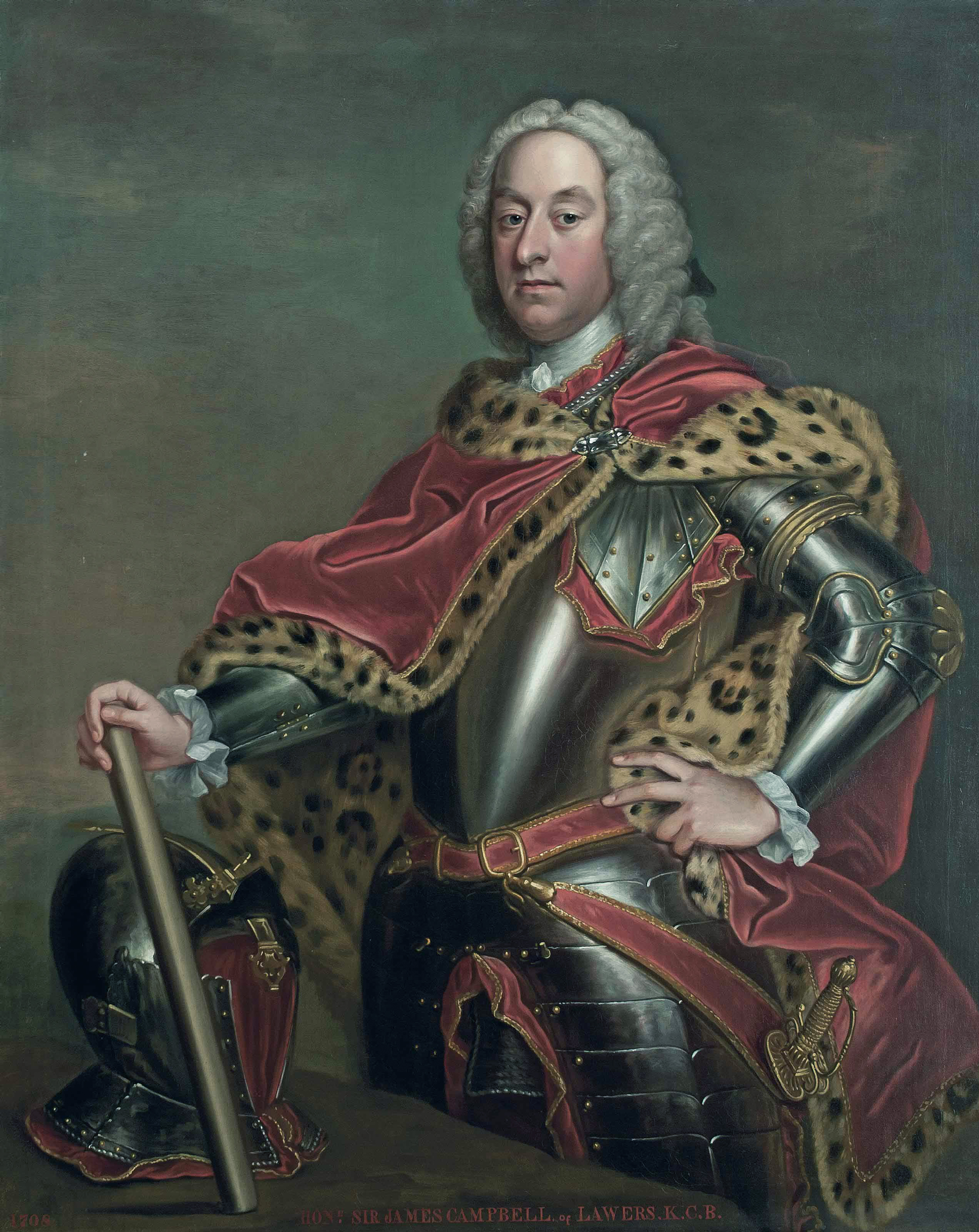
- 1708 portrait

Governor of Edinburgh Castle
- In office 1738–1745
- Monarch: George II
- Preceded by: Lord Ross
- Succeeded by: Lord Mark Kerr

Member of Parliament for Ayrshire
- In office 1727–1741
- Preceded by: John Montgomerie
- Succeeded by: Patrick Craufurd

Personal details
- Born: c. 1680 Lawers, Perthshire
- Died: 11 May 1745 (aged 64–65) Antoing, Austrian Netherlands
- Spouse(s): Lady Jean Boyle Mure (m. 1720)
- Children: 2, including James

Military service
- Allegiance: Scotland (1693–1707); Great Britain (1707–1745)
- Branch/service: Scots Army (1693–1707); British Army (1707–1745)
- Rank: Lieutenant-General
- Battles/wars: War of the Spanish Succession; Battle of Blenheim; Battle of Oudenarde; Battle of Malplaquet; War of the Austrian Succession; Battle of Dettingen; Battle of Fontenoy (DOW)

Lieutenant-General Sir James Campbell (Note: Also known as Sir James Campbell of Lawers.) KB (c. 1680 – 11 May 1745) was a British army officer and Whig politician who represented the constituency of Ayrshire in the House of Commons of Great Britain from 1727 to 1741. A distinguished cavalry officer, Campbell began his military career at a young age and fought in several conflicts of the Second Hundred Years' War, along with serving as the governor of Edinburgh Castle from 1738 until his death in 1745.

Born in Lawers, Perthshire into an aristocratic Scottish family, Campbell joined the Scots Army when he was just thirteen years old. During the War of the Spanish Succession, Campbell served in Europe in the Royal North British Dragoons, fighting in the battles of Blenheim, Oudenarde and Malplaquet and rising to the rank of lieutenant-colonel. Following the war's end, Campbell became involved in politics, supporting the succession of the House of Hanover.

In 1720, Campbell married Lady Jean Boyle Mure, with whom he had two children. Seven years later, Campbell was appointed Groom of the Chamber by George II of Great Britain in recognition of his military accomplishments. Campbell took his seat in Parliament after running unopposed in the 1727 British general election. A steadfast Whig when in Parliament, Campbell continued to climb the British Army's ranks, being promoted to lieutenant-general in 1740.

In 1742, the War of the Austrian Succession broke out and Campbell accompanied a British force to Continental Europe, where he participated in the Battle of Dettingen and was knighted. Campbell continued to see action in Europe, commanding Pragmatic Army troops which fought a French army near Antoing in 1745. During the battle, Campbell led several cavalry charges against French troops, and died of his wounds after a French cannonball tore off his leg.

== Early life ==
James Campbell was born c. 1680 in Lawers, Perthshire. His father, James Campbell, 2nd Earl of Loudoun, was an aristocrat and son of noted Covenanter John Campbell. Campbell's mother was Lady Margaret Montgomerie, the daughter of landowner Hugh Montgomerie, 7th Earl of Eglinton. His brother, Hugh Campbell, would go on to serve as the last Secretary of State of the Kingdom of Scotland prior to the Acts of Union.

In September 1693, when he was approximately thirteen years old, Campbell enlisted in the Scottish Regiment of Foot Guards at the rank of lieutenant. After six years of military service, Campbell was promoted to the rank of captain in July 1699. In 1701, the War of the Spanish Succession broke out; the next year, Campbell was transferred to the Earl of Mar's Regiment of Foot, renewing his own officer's commission in the process.

Campbell was then sent along with the rest of his regiment to Europe, where they fought in the Battle of Blenheim on 13 August 1704, a decisive victory for the Grand Alliance (of which the Kingdom of Scotland was a part). In August 1706, Campbell was transferred again, this time to the Royal North British Dragoons at the rank of lieutenant-colonel. He then fought at the battles of Oudenarde and Malplaquet, both major Allied victories.

== Political career ==
In 1713, the Treaty of Utrecht was signed between the Grand Alliance and the Kingdom of France, bringing British involvement in the conflict to an end (the kingdoms of Scotland and England having been united into the Kingdom of Great Britain in 1707). After the treaty was signed, Campbell started becoming involved in British political affairs, joining forces with his brother Hugh in supporting the Hanoverian Succession to Britain's Queen Anne.

In 1715, Campbell was transferred to Henry Cornewall's Regiment of Foot at the rank of colonel; two years later, he was transferred back to the Royal North British Dragoons at the same rank. When George II of Great Britain succeeded his father to the throne of Great Britain in 1727, he appointed Campbell to the position of Groom of the Chamber, a high-ranking position in Britain's royal household, in recognition of his "military gallantry".

In the same year, Campbell became a Member of Parliament, running unopposed for the parliamentary constituency of Ayrshire at the 1727 British general election "through the influence of his brother." Campbell continued to sit in the House of Commons of Great Britain until the 1741 British general election, when he was defeated by Patrick Craufurd, an anti-Walpole (Note: Robert Walpole was a British statesman who served as Prime Minister of Great Britain from 1721 to 1742.) politician supported by John Campbell, 2nd Duke of Argyll.

Campbell continued to serve in the British Army during this period, though as historian Henry Morse Stephens noted, the tenure of Walpole as British Prime Minister "prevented Campbell from seeing service for twenty-eight years" as Walpole was committed to a policy of non-interventionism. In 1735, Campbell was promoted to the rank of Brigadier-General, and four years later in 1739 he was promoted again to the rank of Major-General.

In 1738, Campbell was appointed to the position of Edinburgh Castle governor, succeeding Lord Ross. His duties included supervising the castle's large garrison. Campbell continued to hold this position until his death, being succeeded by Lord Mark Kerr. During his tenure, a crow-stepped and classical residence for the governor, known as the Governor's House, was constructed inside the castle by army engineer Dugal Campbell in 1742.

== Later life and death ==
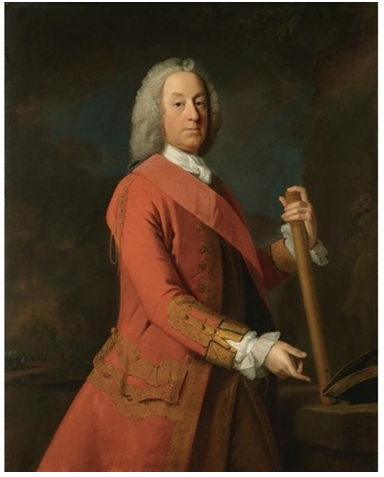
Allan Ramsay, Portrait of General Sir James Campbell of Lawers (1744)

In 1740, the War of the Austrian Succession broke out, and two years later the British government made plans to dispatch a military expedition to the continent, as Britain was a member of the anti-French Pragmatic Alliance. Campbell was promoted to the rank of Lieutenant-General and accompanied George II, who led the expedition himself, to the Continent as head of all British cavalry units present (including the Royal North British Dragoons).

On 27 June 1743, a Pragmatic Alliance army encountered a French force at the village of Dettingen. During the battle, Campbell led a cavalry charge against the Maison Militaire du Roi de France, the household troops of the French Army, which played a major role in securing a victory for the Pragmatic Alliance. After the battle, George II personally invested Campbell as a knight of the Order of the Bath in recognition of his performance during the battle.

The Pragmatic commanders proved unable to agree on how best to exploit their victory, and ended up doing nothing but quartering in the Dutch Republic as the winter set in. George II soon returned to England, though Campbell stayed, continuing to command the cavalry elements of the British expeditionary force. In this, he was assisted by his aide-de-camp, fellow Scotsman John Forbes, who would later go on to serve in the French and Indian War.

On 9 May 1745, a large French army under the command of Maurice de Saxe encountered a Pragmatic force near Antoing. Campbell, leading a large force of British and Hanoverian cavalry, successfully pushed French troops out of two hamlets the next day. His deputy, the Earl of Crawford, then recommended that infantry be used to clear a nearby forest, though the plan was soon abandoned when Dutch hussars were driven off by hidden French troops.

On the next day, both sides formed up lines as the Duke of Cumberland ordered an infantry assault against French positions; meanwhile, Campbell led numerous unsuccessful cavalry charges against the French lines. As the day was nearing its end, Campbell was hit in the leg by a French cannonball, which tore it off. Campbell died of his wounds as he was being put into a litter; his corpse was transported to the city of Brussels, where it was buried.

== Personal life and family ==
During his time in Parliament, Campbell consistently supported the Whigs, which dominated the British political scene during the Georgian era. In his political career, Campbell was held in high regard, even by his opponents. Due to Campbell's reputation, Craufurd's supporters in the 1741 general election spread propaganda that he was unwilling to stand for election in the first place, but had been pushed to become involved several outside parties; those alleged to be involved included his brother, Archibald Campbell, 1st Earl of Ilay and elements in the British royal court.

As part of his military career, Campbell participated in numerous recruitment campaigns in both Scotland and England for the British Army. During these campaigns, Campbell would frequently be accompanied by his aides-de-camps who would provide assistance to him; together, they would occasionally make detours to take care of personal affairs, such as visiting tailors and frequenting coffeehouses. According to English historian John Oliphant, harmonious relations between officers in the British Army frequently "depended on affectionate relationships [such as] these."

On 29 March 1720, Campbell married Lady Jean Boyle Mure, the eldest daughter of David Boyle, 1st Earl of Glasgow and his second wife, Lady Jean Mure. Together, the couple had at least two children, a boy named James who was born on 11 February 1726, and a girl named either Elizabeth or Margaret (as noted by Stephens, historical accounts differ) who was born on 17 May 1727. Mure died just nine years later in Lawers on 19 December 1729, and her body was interred in the town of Kilmarnock, Ayrshire on 26 December; Campbell never remarried after her death.

Campbell changed his son's surname to Mure-Campbell in 1729 in order for him to inherit the Rowallan estate near Kilmaurs, Ayrshire, which was an old family possession. After Campbell died at Fontenoy, James succeeded to his father's estate at Lawers, and in 1782 became the fifth Earl of Loudoun after the death of the fourth earl in the same year. He would only hold the peerage for four years, dying in 1786. The peerage was succeeded by his only child, Flora Mure-Campbell, 6th Countess of Loudoun, who would go on to marry the Marquess of Hastings.

Parliament of Great Britain
Preceded by John Montgomerie	Member of Parliament for Ayrshire; 1727–1741	Succeeded by Patrick Craufurd
Military offices
Preceded by The Lord Ross	Governor of Edinburgh Castle; 1738–1745	Succeeded by Lord Mark Kerr
