= William Cartwright (British Army officer, died 1827) =

British army officer

General William Cartwright
- Born: c. 1754
- Died: 9 February 1827
- Military career
- Allegiance: United Kingdom
- Branch: British Army
- Rank: General

General William Cartwright (c. 1754 – 9 February 1827) was a senior British Army officer.

== Military career ==
Born the son of William Cartwright MP, Cartwright was commissioned as a cornet in the 10th Dragoons in February 1769. He was given command of a brigade of cavalry for overseas service in 1799 and, after promotion to major-general in 1802, was given command of cavalry in the home district. He was colonel of the 23rd Light Dragoons from 1804 to 1807, colonel of the 3rd The King's Own Hussars from 1807 to 1821 and colonel of the 1st King's Dragoon Guards from 1821 to his death in 1827.

Military offices
Preceded by Sir John Floyd	Colonel of the 23rd Regiment of (Light) Dragoons; 1804–1807	Succeeded by Sir William Payne-Gallwey
Preceded by Charles Grey, 1st Earl Grey	Colonel of 3rd The King's Own Hussars; 1807–1821	Succeeded by Stapleton Cotton, 1st Viscount Combermere
Preceded by Francis Edward Gwyn	Colonel of 1st King's Dragoon Guards; 1821–1827	Succeeded by Sir Henry Fane
