= Governor of Sheerness =

Military officer in Sheerness, England

The Governor of Sheerness Fort and the Isle of Sheppey was a military officer who commanded the fortifications at Sheerness, on the Isle of Sheppey, part of the defences of the Medway estuary. The area had been fortified since the time of Henry VIII, but the Sheerness fortifications were destroyed in 1667 when it was captured during the Dutch Raid on the Medway. It was subsequently re-fortified as Sheerness became the site of a major Royal Navy dockyard, in operation until 1960. The post of Governor was abolished in 1852, when the last governor, Lord Combermere, accepted office as the Constable of the Tower.

== Governors of Sheerness ==
- 1666–1668: Sir Chichester Wrey, 3rd Baronet
- 1670–1679: Nathaniel Darrell
- 1679–1690: Sir Charles Lyttelton, 3rd Baronet
- 1690–1706: Robert Crawford
- 1706–1729: Henry Withers
- 1729–1745: Lord Mark Kerr
- 1745–1749: John Huske
- 1749–1752: Charles Cadogan, 2nd Baron Cadogan
- 1752–1778: Sir John Mordaunt
- 1778–1811: Francis Craig
- 1812–1821: Francis Edward Gwyn
- 1821–1852: Stapleton Cotton, 1st Viscount Combermere

== Lieutenant-Governors of Sheerness ==
- 1685–1690: Robert Crawford
- 1690–1725: Thomas King
- 1725–1762: Richard Evans
- ?–1782: Henry Hart
- 1782–1805: Sir James Malcolm, 4th Baronet (died 1805)
- 1805–1806: Alexander Mair
- 1806–1813: Thomas Rudsdell
- 1813–aft. 1841: Robert Walker
