= James Mure-Campbell, 5th Earl of Loudoun =

Scottish aristocrat, soldier and MP

Major-General The Right Honourable The Earl of Loudoun
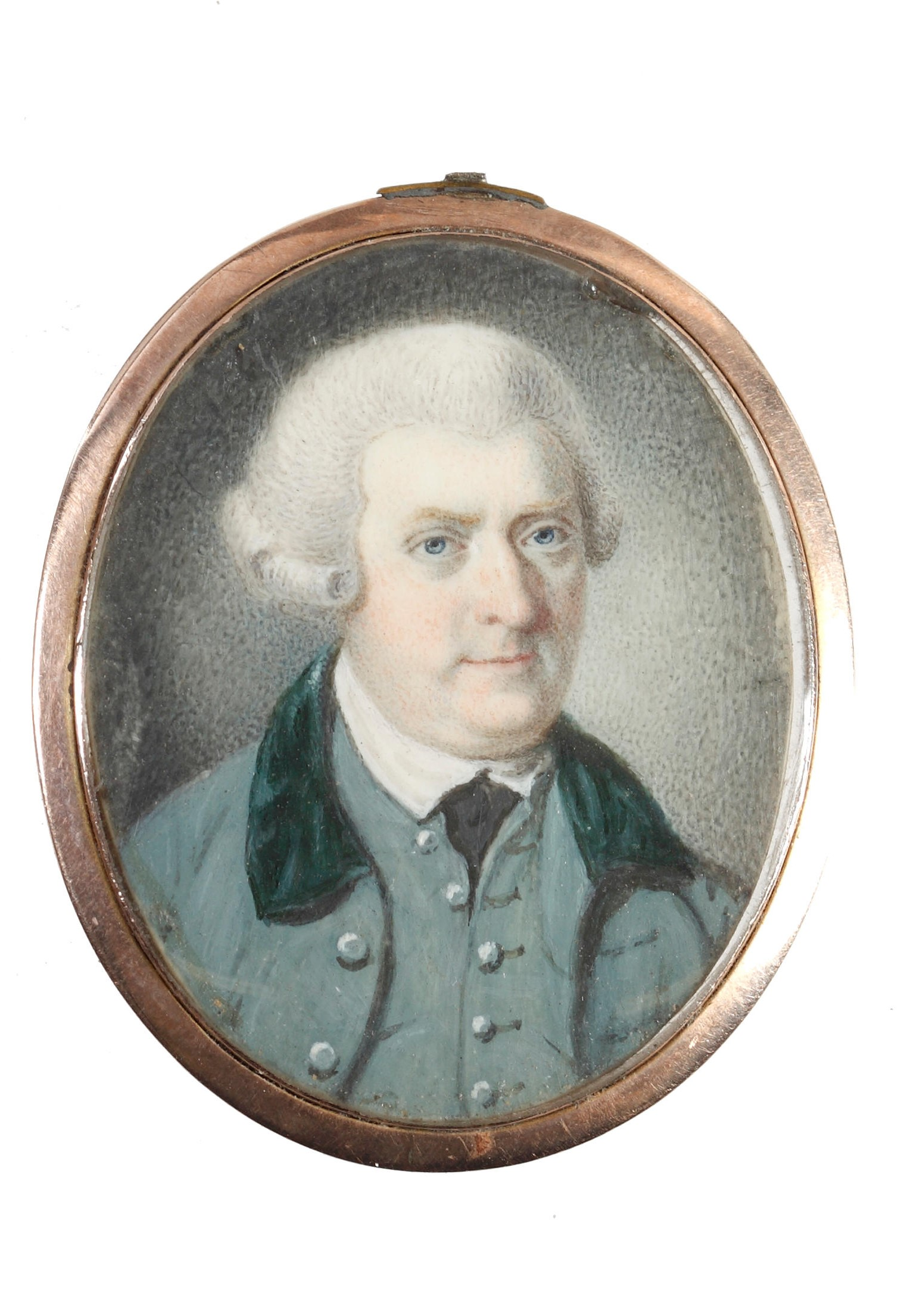
- Born: James Campbell; 11 February 1726
- Died: 28 April 1786 (aged 60)

James Mure-Campbell, 5th Earl of Loudoun (11 February 1726 – 28 April 1786) was a Scottish aristocrat, British Army officer and MP.

He was born the only son of Hon. Sir James Campbell, M.P. of Lawers, Perthshire and Lady Jean Boyle. He assumed the name of Mure in 1729 on succeeding to the Rowallan estate near Kilmaurs, Ayrshire of his grandmother Jean Mure, the Countess of Glasgow, heiress of the family of Mure of Rowallan.

He inherited the Lawers estate near Perth in 1745 on the death of his father at the Battle of Fontenoy and succeeded his cousin to the title of 5th Earl of Loudoun in 1782.

He served in the British Army, reaching the rank of major general by 1781 and represented Ayrshire in Parliament from 1754 to 1761.

He married Flora Macleod, daughter of John Macleod of Raasay; their only child Flora Mure-Campbell succeeded to the title as 6th Countess of Loudoun.

== Coat of arms ==
Coat of arms of James Mure-Campbell, 5th Earl of Loudoun
Coronet A coronet of an Earl Crest An eagle with two necks displayed gules in a flame of fire proper. Escutcheon Gyronny of eight ermine and gules. Supporters Dexter: an armed man bearing a pick on his shoulder proper; Sinister: a lady richly attired with a signet letter in her sinister hand proper. Motto l byde my tyme

== See also ==
- Earl of Loudoun

Peerage of Scotland
Preceded by John Campbell	Earl of Loudoun; 1782–1786	Succeeded by Flora Mure-Campbell
