= Equestrian statue of Viscount Combermere =

Statue in Chester, United Kingdom

Equestrian statue of Stapleton Cotton, 1st Viscount Combermere
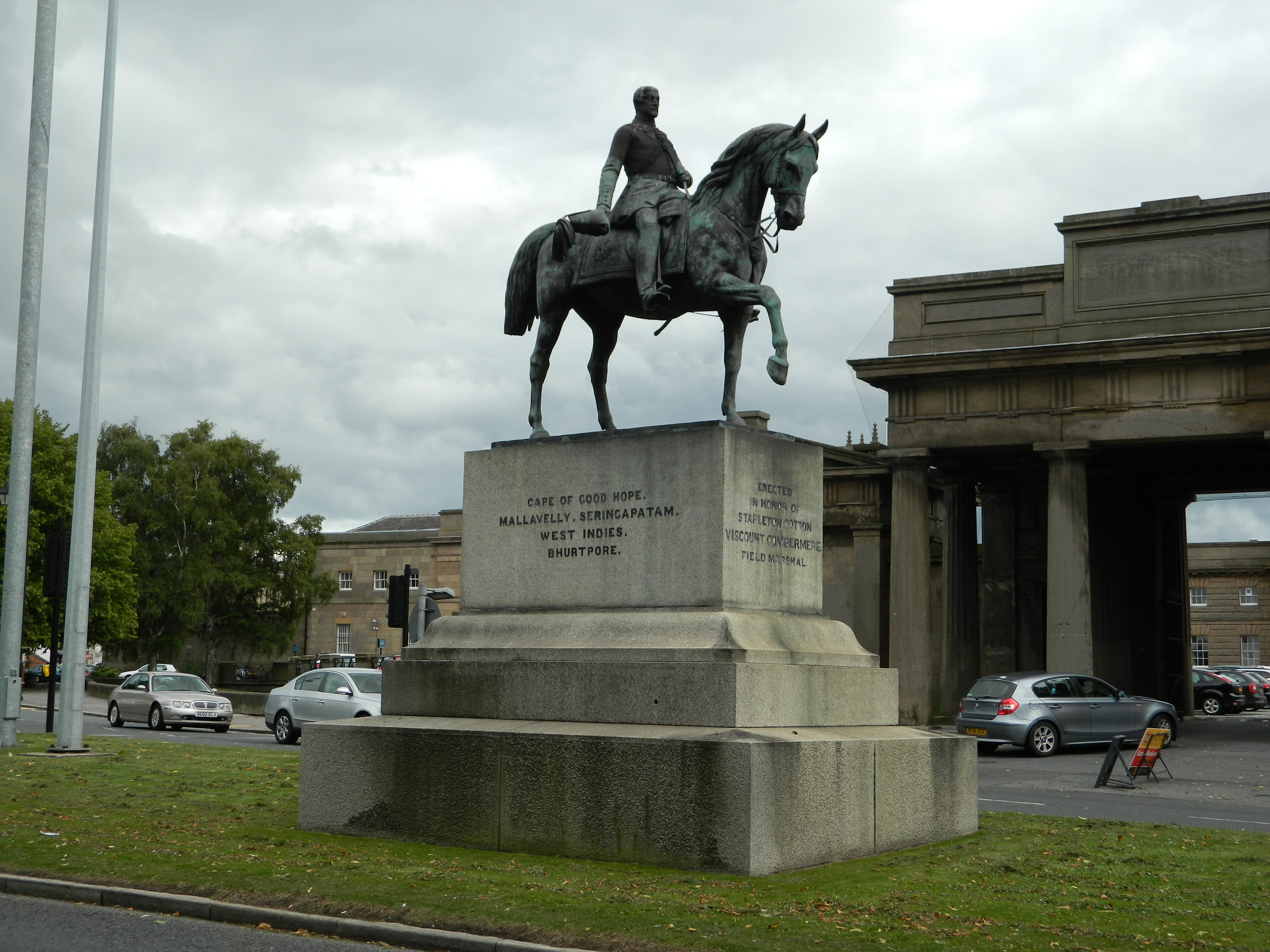
- Statue of Viscount Combermere
- Artist: Carlo Marochetti
- Year: 1865
- Medium: Bronze
- Subject: Stapleton Cotton, 1st Viscount Combermere
- Dimensions: 3.4 m (130 in)
- Location: Chester, Cheshire, England; 53.18640°N 2.89369°W

The equestrian statue of Viscount Combermere stands on an island in Grosvenor Road, Chester, Cheshire, England, opposite the entrance to Chester Castle. It commemorates his successful military career, and was made by Carlo Marochetti. It is recorded in the National Heritage List for England as a designated Grade II* listed building.

== History ==
Stapleton Cotton, 1st Viscount Combermere (1773–1865) was a cavalry officer, diplomat and politician, who served with distinction under Wellington in the Peninsular War. In 1863 it was suggested that a monument to him should be erected. The proposal quickly gained support from the major landowners of Cheshire and John Graham, Bishop of Chester, who were all major subscribers to the project. It was agreed, because of Combermere's distinguished cavalry career, that the monument should be an equestrian statue. Carlo Marochetti, noted for his equestrian statues, was commissioned to create the work. It was also agreed that the statue should stand on a prestigious site opposite Chester Castle. Work began in 1864 but, before the work could be completed, Combermere died in February 1865. The statue was unveiled on 26 October 1865 and cost about £5,000 (equivalent to £540,000 in 2025). Around £7,000 had been raised from the subscriptions, and the difference was given to charitable causes. It was the first major piece of open-air public sculpture to be erected in Cheshire.

== Description ==
The statue consists of a bronze figure seated on a horse, standing on a pedestal of Cornish granite. The figure is about 3.4 metres (11 ft) in height, and the pedestal is about 3.7 metres (12 ft) high. Combermere is dressed in the uniform of a field marshal, sitting on a horse at rest with one foot raised. The pedestal is inscribed with Combermere's name and dates, and the names of the major conflicts in which he had been involved.

== Appraisal ==
The statue was designated as a Grade II* listed building on 10 January 1972. Grade II* is the middle of the three grades of listing designated by English Heritage, and is granted to "particularly important buildings of more than special interest".

== See also ==
- Grade II* listed buildings in Cheshire West and Chester
