= Francis Edward Gwyn =

British Army officer (1748–1821)

General Francis Edward Gwyn
- Born: 1748
- Died: 1821 (aged 72–73)
- Military career
- Allegiance: United Kingdom
- Branch: British Army
- Rank: General
- Conflicts: American War of Independence

General Francis Edward Gwyn (1748–1821) was a senior British Army officer.

== Military career ==
Gwyn was commissioned as an ensign in the 17th Dragoons in February 1760. He served in the American War of Independence under Sir William Howe, Sir Henry Clinton and Lord Cornwallis. He was Governor of Sheerness from 1812 until his death in 1821 and also served as colonel of the 1st King's Dragoon Guards from 1820 until his death in 1821.

Military offices
Preceded by Francis Craig	Governor of Sheerness; 1812–1821	Succeeded by Stapleton Cotton, 1st Viscount Combermere
Preceded by David Dundas	Colonel of 1st King's Dragoon Guards; 1820–1821	Succeeded by William Cartwright
