= John Huske =

British Army general

Lieutenant-General John Huske
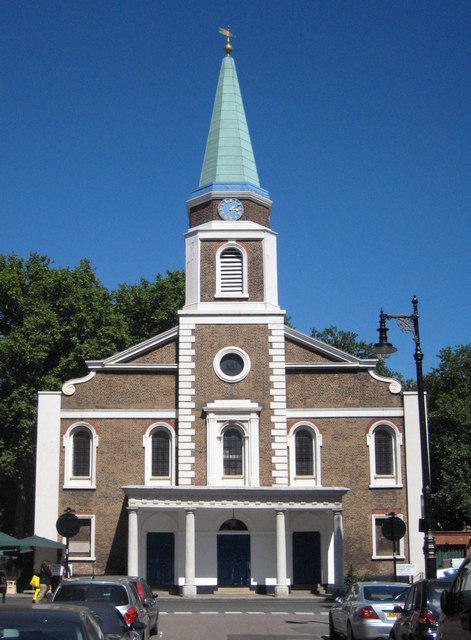
- Grosvenor Chapel, in Audley Street where Huske was buried

Governor of Jersey
- In office 1749–1751

Governor of Sheerness
- In office 1745–1749

Lieutenant Governor Hurst Castle
- In office 1745–1745

Personal details
- Born: 1692 Newmarket, Suffolk
- Died: 18 January 1761 (aged 68–69) Albemarle Street, London

Military service
- Allegiance: Great Britain
- Branch/service: British Army
- Years of service: 1708–1749
- Rank: Lieutenant-General
- Unit: Colonel, 23rd Foot, later Royal Welch Fusiliers 1743–1761
- Battles/wars: War of the Spanish Succession; Battle of Malplaquet; War of the Austrian Succession; Battle of Dettingen; Battle of Lauffeld; Jacobite Rising of 1745; Battle of Falkirk Muir; Battle of Culloden

Lieutenant-General John Huske (c. 1692 – 18 January 1761) was a British Army officer whose active service began in 1707 during the War of the Spanish Succession and ended in 1748.

During his early career, he was a close associate of the Earl of Cadogan and the Duke of Marlborough. From 1715 to 1720, he was also employed as a British political and diplomatic agent, primarily involved in anti-Jacobite operations. He commanded a brigade at Dettingen; during the Jacobite rising of 1745, he fought at Falkirk, Muir, and Culloden. Promoted major-general in 1743, his active career ended when the War of the Austrian Succession ended in 1748.

He never married and died in London on 18 January 1761. His brother Ellis emigrated to North America, and one of his relatives, another John Huske, was a delegate to the 1789 North Carolina Constitutional Convention.

== Personal details ==
John Huske was born in 1692, eldest son of John (1651–1703) and Mary Huske (1656–?); little is known of his family background, other than they were members of the minor gentry in Newmarket, Suffolk. His younger brother Ellis (1700–1755) emigrated to the Thirteen Colonies, where he worked as a journalist.

His nephews included Ellis' son John (1724–1773), described by historian Lewis Namier as a 'tough, unscrupulous adventurer'. Born in Portsmouth, New Hampshire, he moved to England in 1748 and was Elected MP for Maldon in 1763. He worked closely with Charles Townshend, author of the Stamp Act 1765, a key milestone in the lead up to the 1775 American Revolution. Accused of embezzling £30,000–£40,000, he fled to Paris in 1769, where he died in 1773. Another American relative, John Huske (?–1792) was a representative to the 1788 Hillsborough Convention and the 1789 Fayetteville Convention in North Carolina.

Huske never married. When he died in January 1761, he left £5,000 (2019; £1 million) to his head groom, £3,000 to his valet, and £100 to the 'poor of Newmarket.'

== Career ==
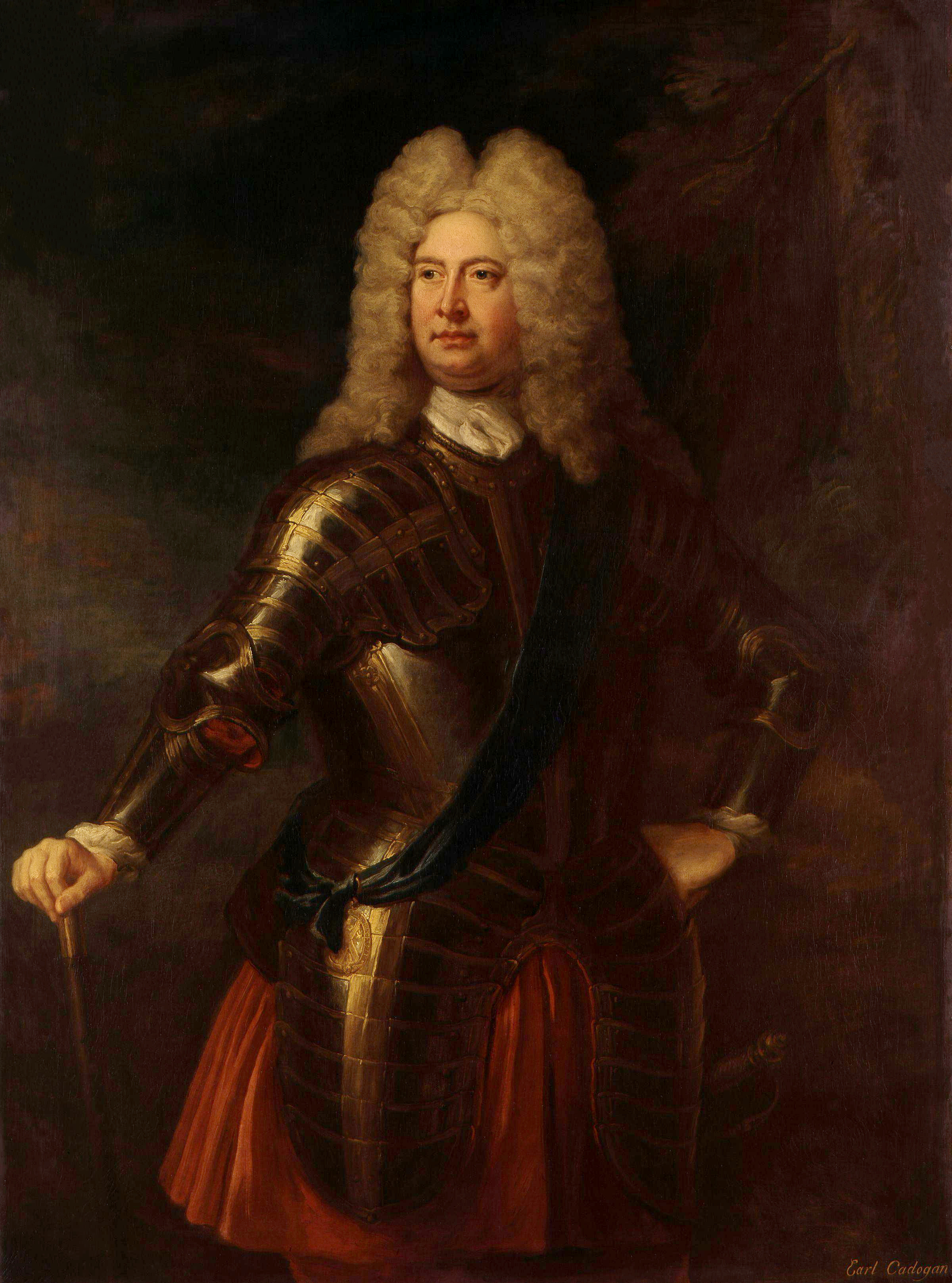
William Cadogan (1671–1726); Huske was closely associated with him for nearly 20 years

Huske began his career during the War of the Spanish Succession in "Caulfield's Regiment of Foot", a unit recruited in Ireland and sent to garrison Barcelona in May 1706. His commission as an ensign dates from August 1707, several months after the regiment and four others had been officially disbanded. A Parliamentary committee later reported it arrived in Spain significantly understrength.

This makes Huske's early movements hard to trace, but in March 1709 he joined the 5th Dragoon Guards in Flanders as a cornet, and fought at Malplaquet in September. The regiment was commanded by William Cadogan, close aide to the Duke of Marlborough a connection of great benefit to Huske's future career.

In March 1709, he became an ensign in the Foot Guards, although this did not imply service; only 16 of its nominal 24 companies were actually formed and Huske remained with his original unit. Under the practice known as double-ranking, Guards officers held a second and higher army rank; a Guards ensign ranked as a regular army captain. A Guards commission gave the holder higher precedence in determining promotions, and since they were rarely disbanded, Marlborough used them to reward competent officers like Huske with no money.

George I succeeded Queen Anne in 1714, and in January 1715, Huske became a captain in the 15th Foot; in July, he also received a captain's commission in the Coldstream Guards. When the Jacobite rising of 1715 began, the Whig administration approved the detention of six Members of Parliament, including Sir William Wyndham, a Tory leader in South-West England and Jacobite sympathiser. Wyndham's brother-in-law was the Earl of Hertford, colonel of Huske's regiment, the 15th Foot. Huske was sent to arrest Wyndham at his home near Minehead, who promised to accompany him after saying goodbye to his wife, before escaping through a window. Given the prevailing social convention that a gentleman's word was his bond, this was felt to reflect badly on Wyndham, who was recaptured soon after. Huske escaped blame and joined Cadogan in the Dutch Republic, where he helped arrange the transport of 6,000 Dutch troops to Scotland.

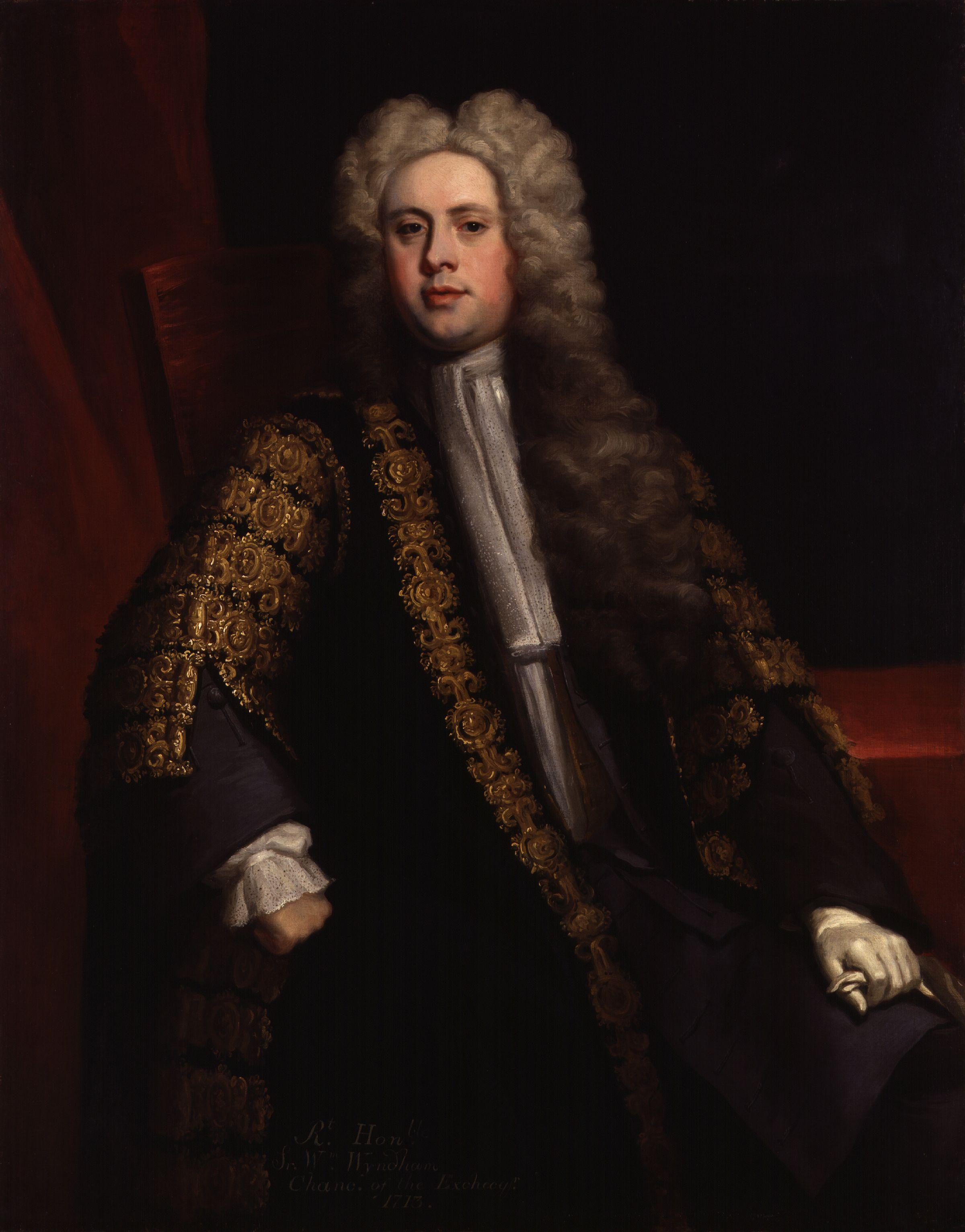
Sir William Wyndham

Marlborough suffered the first of a series of strokes in May 1716; he remained Master-General of the Ordnance or army commander until his death in 1722, but Cadogan took over many of his duties. Huske took part in a number of anti-Jacobite intelligence operations; during the 1719 Rising, he worked with diplomat Charles Whitworth to transfer five Dutch battalions to Britain, although the revolt collapsed before this became necessary.

Huske and the Earl of Albemarle accompanied Cadogan on his 1720 diplomatic mission to Vienna, the beginning of a long friendship between the two men. It was a high-profile assignment, trying to create an anti-Russian alliance, and end Swedish support for the Jacobites. Cadogan became Master-General when Marlborough died in 1722, before being disgraced by his involvement in the financial scandal known as the South Sea bubble. Huske was appointed lieutenant governor of Hurst Castle in July 1721; Cadogan's death in 1726, and the slow pace of promotion in peace time meant by 1739, he was still a major.

When the War of the Austrian Succession began in December 1740, he became colonel of the 32nd Foot; transferred to Flanders, he was badly wounded commanding a brigade at Dettingen in June 1743. Now chiefly remembered as the last time a British monarch led troops in battle, Huske was promoted major general in July, appointed colonel of the 23rd Foot, and made Governor of Sheerness in 1745.

== 1745 rebellion ==
The Jacobite rising of 1745 began in August; in September, Huske landed in Newcastle with 6,000 German and Dutch troops, captured at Tournai in June and released on condition they did not fight against the French. After a long and distinguished career, George Wade, commander in the North, was no longer fit for service, the Dutch and Germans refused to march without being paid in advance and one observer wrote, 'I never saw so ill a conducted Machine as Our Army.' The Jacobites invaded England on 8 November, before turning back at Derby on 6 December; leaving a garrison at Carlisle, they re-entered Scotland on 21 December. Cumberland and the main field army besieged Carlisle; Henry Hawley was appointed commander in Scotland, with Huske as his deputy.

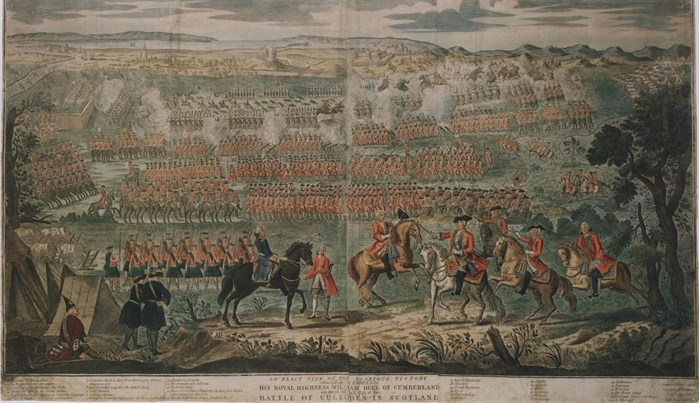
Battle of Culloden; Huske commanded the second line on the government left

After arriving in Edinburgh, on 13 January 1746 Huske and 4,000 men moved north to relieve Stirling Castle, then besieged by the Jacobites. Hawley and an additional 3,000 men met up with him at Falkirk on 16 January, where the main Jacobite force was waiting. Hawley overestimated both the vulnerability of Highland infantry to cavalry, and seriously underestimated their numbers and fighting qualities. This contributed to his defeat at Falkirk Muir on 17 January, a battle that started late in the afternoon in failing light and heavy snow and was marked by confusion on both sides. The government dragoons charged the Jacobite right but were repulsed in disorder, scattering their own infantry who also fled; the regiments under Huske held their ground, allowing the bulk of the army to withdraw in good order. They were helped by confusion among the Jacobite commanders and by the Highlanders diverting to loot the baggage train.

Cumberland arrived in Edinburgh on 30 January and resumed the advance while the Jacobites retreated to Inverness. At the Battle of Culloden on 16 April, Huske commanded the reserves on the government left, which took the weight of the Jacobite charge. The front rank gave ground, but Huske brought his troops onto their flank, exposing the Highlanders to volleys of fire at close range from three sides. Unable to respond, they broke and fled, the battle lasting less than forty minutes.

Jacobite losses were estimated as between 1,200 and 1,500 dead, many killed during the pursuit that followed; this was common, and troops that held together, such as the French regulars, were far less vulnerable than those who scattered like the Highlanders. The widely reported killing of Jacobite wounded after the battle, allegedly on the orders of senior government officers, was certainly unusual. When Huske was based at Fort Augustus as commander of 'pacification' operations, he proposed a £5 bounty for the head of every rebel brought into camp. While this was rejected, author and historian John Prebble refers to the killings as 'symptomatic of the army's general mood and behaviour.'

== Post-1745 career ==
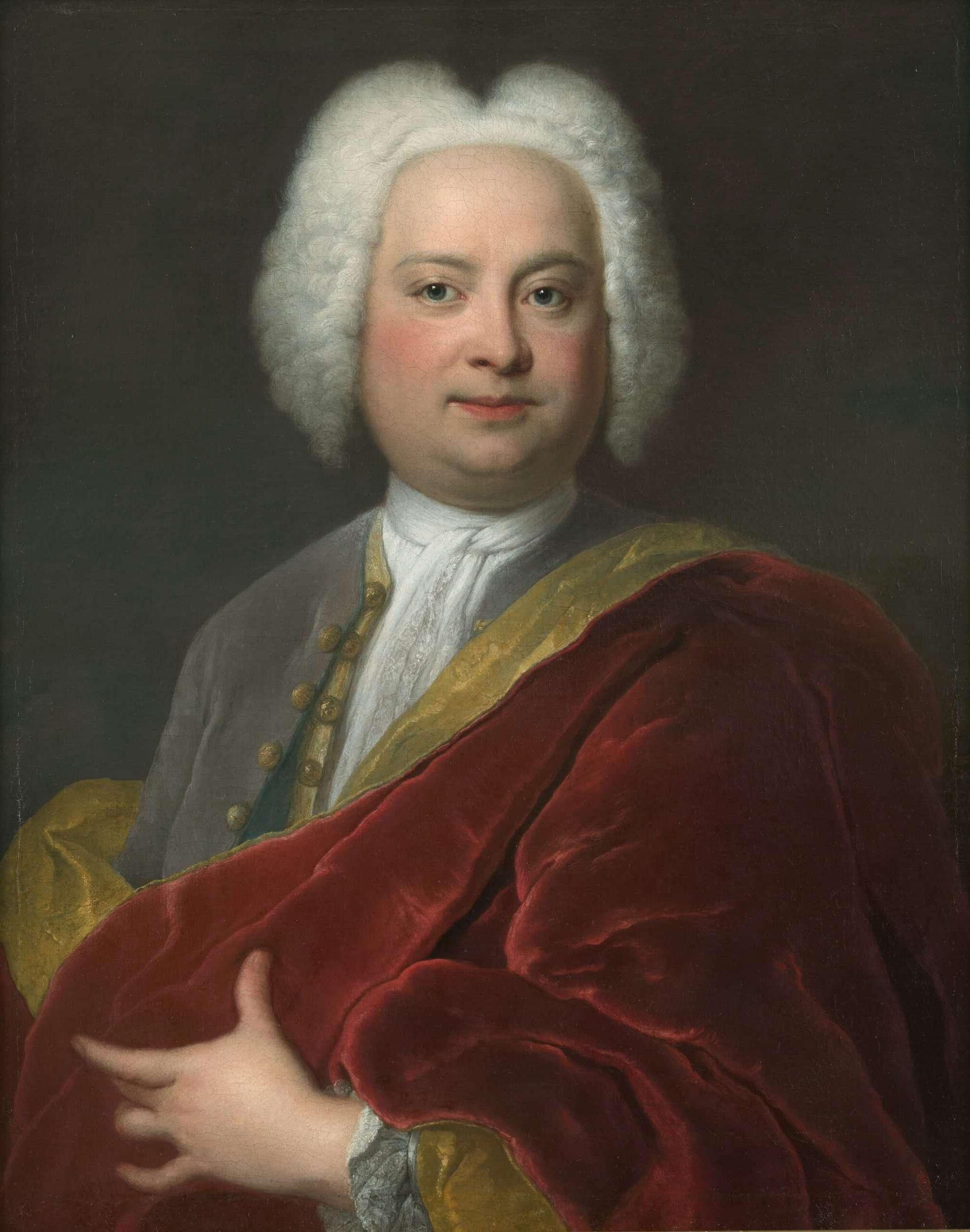
Lord Albemarle, a friend of Huske who was buried next to him

Huske was promoted lieutenant general for his service during the Rising, and returned to Flanders, where his regiment suffered heavy casualties in the Allied defeat at Lauffeld in July 1747. Shortly afterwards, Cumberland sent him to inspect and report back on the Dutch town of Bergen op Zoom, then besieged by the French; it surrendered in September.

Huske ended his active military career after the 1748 Treaty of Aix-la-Chapelle and did not accompany his regiment when it was sent to Minorca in 1755. Along with the rest of the garrison, in June 1756 the 23rd surrendered to the French in the opening battle of the Seven Years' War, a defeat that led to the execution of Admiral John Byng. A 1757 investigation noted the poor state of the island's defences, with crumbling walls and rotten gun platforms; over 35 senior officers were absent from their posts, including the colonels of all four regiments in its garrison, one being Huske.

The practice of delegating such offices was common; although appointed Governor of Jersey in 1749, Huske appears to have visited the island only once, in 1751. His will left £2,000 to Charles d'Auvergne, who deputised for him in Jersey. He purchased a small estate in Ealing, then outside London, and rented a house in Albemarle Street, London, where he died on 18 January 1761. As instructed in his will, he was buried without ceremony in Grosvenor Chapel; his coffin was placed next to that of Albemarle, his long-time friend and colleague who died in 1754.

== Sources ==
- Boyer, Mr (1716). Quadriennium Annæ Postremum; Or the Political State of Great Britain Volume 10.
- Dalton, Charles (1904). English army lists and commission registers, 1661-1714 Volume VI. Eyre & Spottiswood.
- Debrett (1792). History, Debates & Proceedings of Parliament 1743-1774; Volume III. Debrett.
- Fortescue, John H (1899). History of the British Army; Volume II.
- Hartley, Janet (2002). Charles Whitworth: Diplomat in the Age of Peter the Great. Routledge. ISBN 978-0754604808.
- Lord, Evelyn (2004). The Stuart Secret Army: The Hidden History of the English Jacobites. Pearson. ISBN 978-0582772564.
- Lord Elcho, David (1907). Charteris, Edward Evan (ed.). A short account of the affairs of Scotland : in the years 1744, 1745, 1746. David Douglas, Edinburgh.
- Matthews, Shirley (1970). Sedgwick, Romney (ed.). Charles Whitworth (ca 1675-1725) in The History of Parliament: the House of Commons 1715-1754. HMSO.
- Mckinnon, Daniel (1833). Origin and Services of the Coldstream Guards, Volume 2. Richard Bentley.
- Nichols, John (1760). The Gentleman's magazine; Volume 29. E Cave.
- Nichols, John (1761). The Gentleman's magazine; Volume 31. E Cave.
- Powell, William, ed. (1988). Dictionary of North Carolina Biography. Univ of North Carolina Press. ISBN 978-1469629032.
- Prebble, John (1963). Culloden (2002 ed.). Pimlico. ISBN 978-0712668200.
- Regan, Geoffrey (2000). Brassey's Book of Naval Blunders. Brassey's. ISBN 978-1574882537.
- Riding, Jacqueline (2016). Jacobites: A New History of the 45 Rebellion. Bloomsbury. ISBN 978-1408819128.
- Royle, Trevor (2016). Culloden; Scotland's Last Battle and the Forging of the British Empire. Little, Brown. ISBN 978-1408704011.
- Rumble, A; Dimmer, Charles, eds. (2006). Calendar of State Papers 1705-1706, Volume IV; Of the Reign of Anne. Boydell Press.
- Scouller, R.E (1976). "The Peninsula in the War of the Spanish Succession". Journal of the Society for Army Historical Research. 54 (220).
- Spain, Jonathan (2004). "Huske, John". Oxford Dictionary of National Biography (online ed.). Oxford University Press. doi:10.1093/ref:odnb/14262. (Subscription, Wikipedia Library access or UK public library membership required.)
- Springman, Michael (2008). The Guards Brigade in the Crimea. Pen and Sword. ISBN 978-1844156788.
- Yonge, William (1740). A List of the Colonels, Lieutenant Colonels, Majors, Captains, Lieutenants and Ensigns, of His Majesty's Forces. HMSO.

Military offices
Preceded by Simon Descury	Colonel, 32nd Foot; 1740–1743	Succeeded by Henry Skelton
Preceded by Newsham Peers	Colonel, 23rd Foot, later Royal Welch Fusiliers; 1743–1761	Succeeded by Hon. George Boscawen
Preceded by Lord Mark Kerr	Governor of Sheerness; 1745–1749	Succeeded by 2nd Baron Cadogan
Preceded by Viscount Cobham	Governor of Jersey; 1749–1761	Succeeded by 3rd Earl of Albemarle
