= Stapleton Cotton, 1st Viscount Combermere =

British Army officer, politician and colonial administrator

Field Marshal The Right Honourable The Viscount Combermere GCB GCH KSI PC
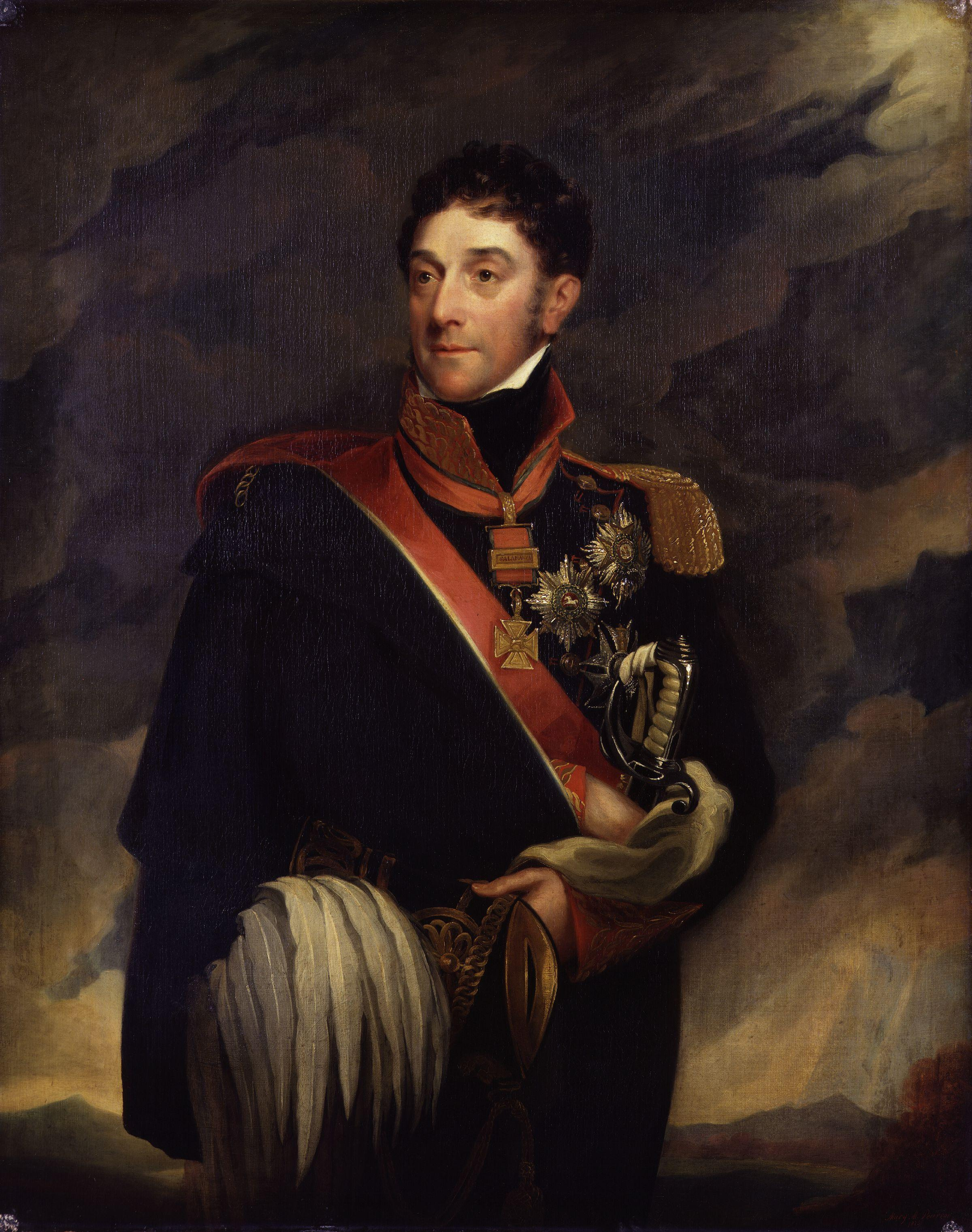
- Portrait by Mary Martha Pearson, 1825

Governor of Barbados
- In office 1817–1820
- Monarch: George III
- Preceded by: John Foster Alleyne (acting)
- Succeeded by: John Brathwaite Skeete (acting)

Personal details
- Born: 14 November 1773 Lleweni Hall, Denbighshire
- Died: 21 February 1865 (aged 91) Clifton, Bristol, Bristol
- Education: Westminster School
- Awards: Knight Grand Cross of the Order of the Bath; Knight Grand Cross of the Royal Guelphic Order; Knight Companion of the Order of the Star of India

Military service
- Allegiance: Great Britain; United Kingdom
- Branch/service: British Army
- Years of service: 1790–1830
- Rank: Field Marshal
- Commands: 25th Light Dragoons; 16th Light Dragoons; Commander-in-Chief, Ireland; Commander-in-Chief, India
- Battles/wars: French Revolutionary Wars; Fourth Anglo-Mysore War; Irish rebellion of 1803; Peninsular War • Battle of Villagarcia • Battle of Venta del Pozo; Siege of Bharatpur (1825–1826)

Field Marshal Stapleton Cotton, 1st Viscount Combermere, GCB, GCH, KSI, PC (14 November 1773 – 21 February 1865) was a British Army officer, politician and colonial administrator who served as the governor of Barbados from 1817 to 1820. As a junior officer, he took part in the Flanders campaign, the Fourth Anglo-Mysore War and in the Irish rebellion of 1803. Cotton commanded a cavalry brigade in Sir Arthur Wellesley's Army before being given overall command of the cavalry in the latter stages of the Peninsular War. He went on to be Commander-in-Chief, Ireland and then Commander-in-Chief, India. In the latter role he stormed Bharatpur—a fort which previously had been deemed impregnable.

== Career ==
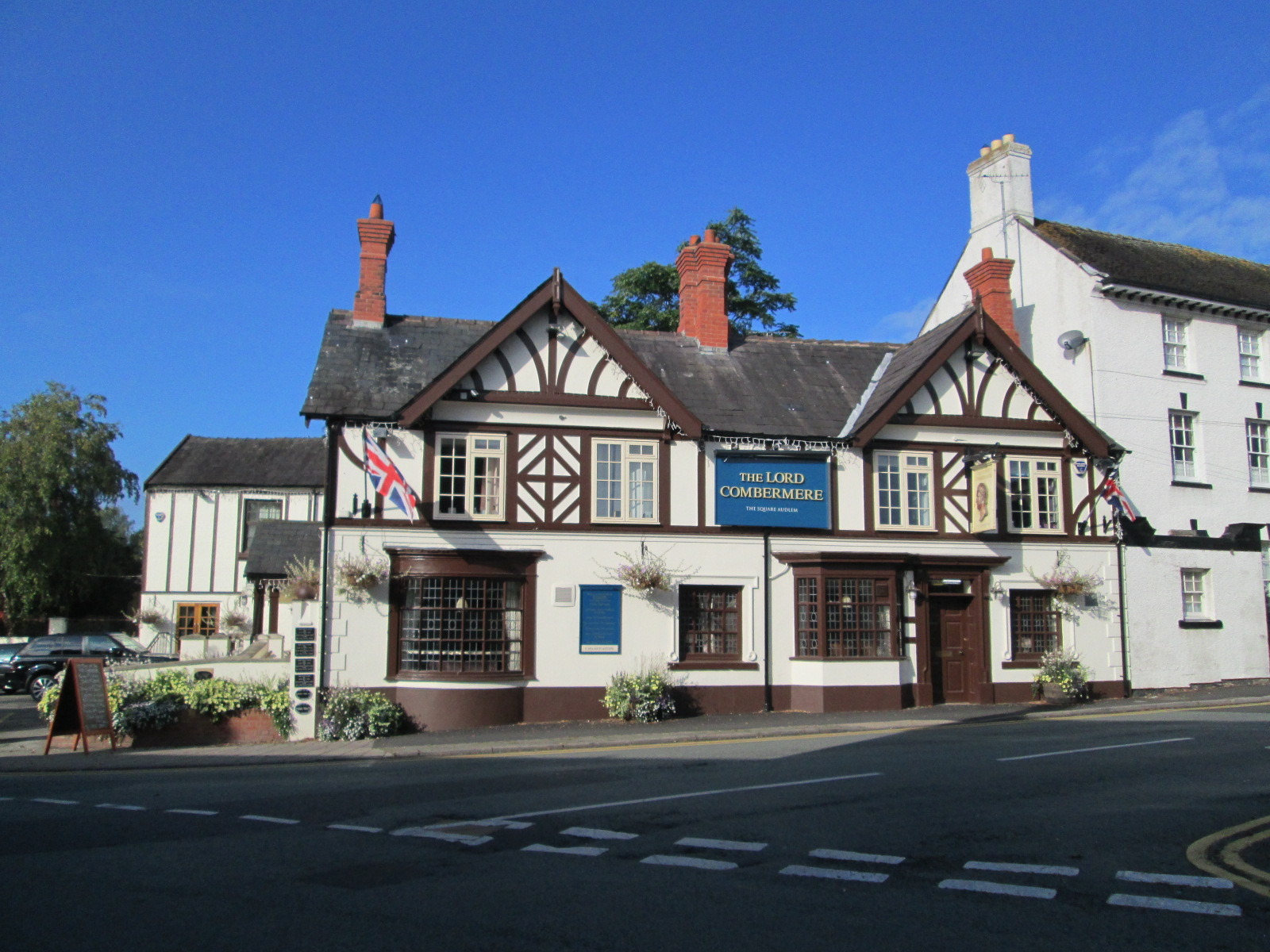
The Lord Combermere pub in Audlem, Cheshire

=== 1790–1805 ===
Cotton was born at Lleweni Hall, Denbighshire in Wales, the second surviving son of Sir Robert Salusbury Cotton, 5th Baronet and Frances Cotton (née Stapleton). When he was eight, Cotton was sent to board at the grammar school in Audlem some 8 miles (13 km) from the family's estate at Combermere Abbey, where he was tutored by the headmaster, the Reverend William Salmon, who was also chaplain of the private Cotton chapel outside the estate gates. A quick, lively boy, he was known by his family as 'Young Rapid,' and was continually in scrapes. After three years in Audlem, he continued his education at Westminster School where he joined the fourth form under Dr. Dodd and his contemporaries included future soldiers Jack Byng, Robert Wilson and the poet Robert Southey. He was then sent to Norwood House, a private military academy in Bayswater, which was run by a Shropshire militiaman, Major Reynolds, an acquaintance of his father's. On 26 February 1790, Cotton's father obtained for him a second-lieutenancy, without purchase, in the 23rd Regiment of Foot or Royal Welch Fusiliers, which he joined in Dublin in 1791. He was promoted to lieutenant in the 77th Regiment of Foot on 9 April 1791 and, having transferred back to the 23rd Regiment of Foot on 13 April 1791, he was promoted to captain in the 6th Dragoon Guards on 28 February 1793. He served with his regiment at the Siege of Dunkirk in August 1793 and at the Battle of Beaumont in April 1794 under the Duke of York during the Flanders Campaign. He became a major in the 59th Regiment of Foot on 28 April 1794 and commanding officer of the 25th Light Dragoons (subsequently 22nd) with the rank of lieutenant colonel on 27 September 1794.

In 1796 Cotton went with his regiment to India. En route he took part in operations in Cape Colony (July to August 1796), and on arrival was present at the Siege of Seringapatam in May 1799 during the Fourth Anglo-Mysore War, where he first met Colonel Arthur Wellesley, later the Duke of Wellington. He became commanding officer of the 16th Light Dragoons, then based in Brighton, on 18 February 1800. Promoted to colonel on 1 January 1800, he was posted with his regiment to Ireland in 1802 and took part in the suppression of Robert Emmet's insurrection in 1803. Promoted to major-general on 2 November 1805, he was given command of a cavalry brigade at Weymouth.

=== Peninsular War ===
Cotton was elected Member of Parliament for Newark in 1806. He was deployed to Portugal in April 1809 and commanded a cavalry brigade in Sir Arthur Wellesley's Army. Cotton was both courageous and also splendidly dressed in battle throughout the Peninsular War and was nicknamed the "Lion d' Or" ("Lion of Gold"). He took part in the Second Battle of Porto in May 1809 and the Battle of Talavera in July 1809 and, having succeeded to his father's baronetcy in August 1809, returned home to view his estate. He returned to Portugal in May 1810 and, having been promoted to the local rank of lieutenant-general and given overall command of the cavalry, fought at the Battle of Bussaco in September 1810 and then covered the withdrawal to the Lines of Torres Vedras later that year.

After fighting at the Battle of Sabugal in April 1811 and the Battle of Fuentes de Oñoro in May 1811, Cotton was promoted to the substantive rank of lieutenant-general on 1 January 1812. He took part in the Battle of Salamanca in July 1812, where he was second-in-command of the Army. During the engagement he successfully led a cavalry charge against Maucune's division, leading Wellington to exclaim, "By God, Cotton, I never saw anything so beautiful in my life; the day is yours." According to Wellington's subsequent despatch, "Cotton made a most gallant and successful charge against a body of the enemy's infantry which they overthrew and cut to pieces." At the end of the battle he was accidentally shot by a Portuguese sentry. In recognition of his gallantry he was appointed a Knight of the Order of the Bath on 21 August 1812 and an honorary Knight Grand Cross of the Portuguese Military Order of the Tower and Sword on 11 March 1813.

Cotton went on to fight at the Battle of the Pyrenees in July 1813, the Battle of Orthez in February 1814 and the Battle of Toulouse in April 1814. For these services he was raised to the peerage as Baron Combermere in the county palatine of Chester on 3 May 1814 and advanced to Knight Grand Cross of the Order of the Bath on 4 January 1815.

=== 1815–1822 ===
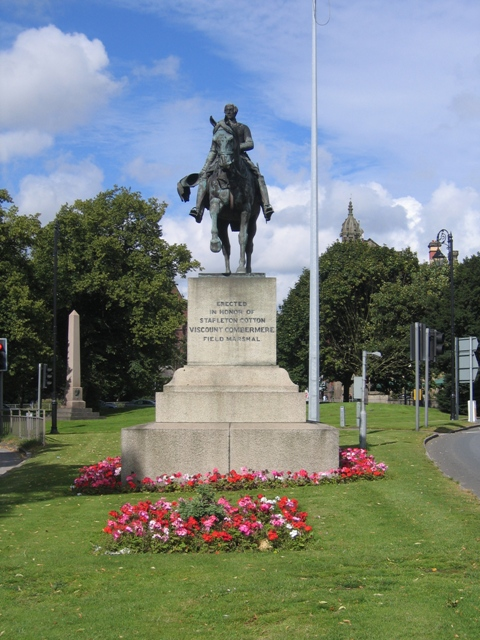
Statue of Lord Combermere outside Chester Castle, Cheshire

Cotton was not present at the Battle of Waterloo as the command of the cavalry had been given, at the insistence of the Prince Regent, to Lord Uxbridge, a more senior general. When Uxbridge was wounded Cotton took over his command and served with the Army of Occupation following the cessation of hostilities.

Cotton became Governor of Barbados and commander of the West Indian forces in March 1817. In the West Indies, Cotton's aide-de-camp was Thomas Moody, Kt..

Cotton is mentioned in unverified stories of the Chase Vault as being a witness to its allegedly "moving coffins" while serving as Governor of Barbados. Between 1814 and 1820, Cotton undertook an extensive remodelling of his home, Combermere Abbey, including Gothic ornamentation of the Abbot's House and the construction of Wellington's Wing (now demolished) to mark Wellington's visit to the house in 1820. He was appointed the last Governor of Sheerness in January 1821 and became Commander-in-Chief, Ireland in 1822.

=== 1825–30 ===
Having been promoted to full general on 27 May 1825 Cotton became Commander-in-Chief, India. In that role on 18 January 1826, after a three-week siege, he stormed the capital of the Princely state of Bharatpur (also known as Bhurtpore) with its fort, which had previously been deemed impregnable, and restored the rightful raja to the throne. For his success in India he was raised in the peerage as Viscount Combermere on 8 February 1827. On his return to England, he brought with him the 17.75-ton Bhurtpore gun, which for many years stood outside the Royal Artillery Barracks at Woolwich. He retired from active service in 1830.

=== Post 1850 ===
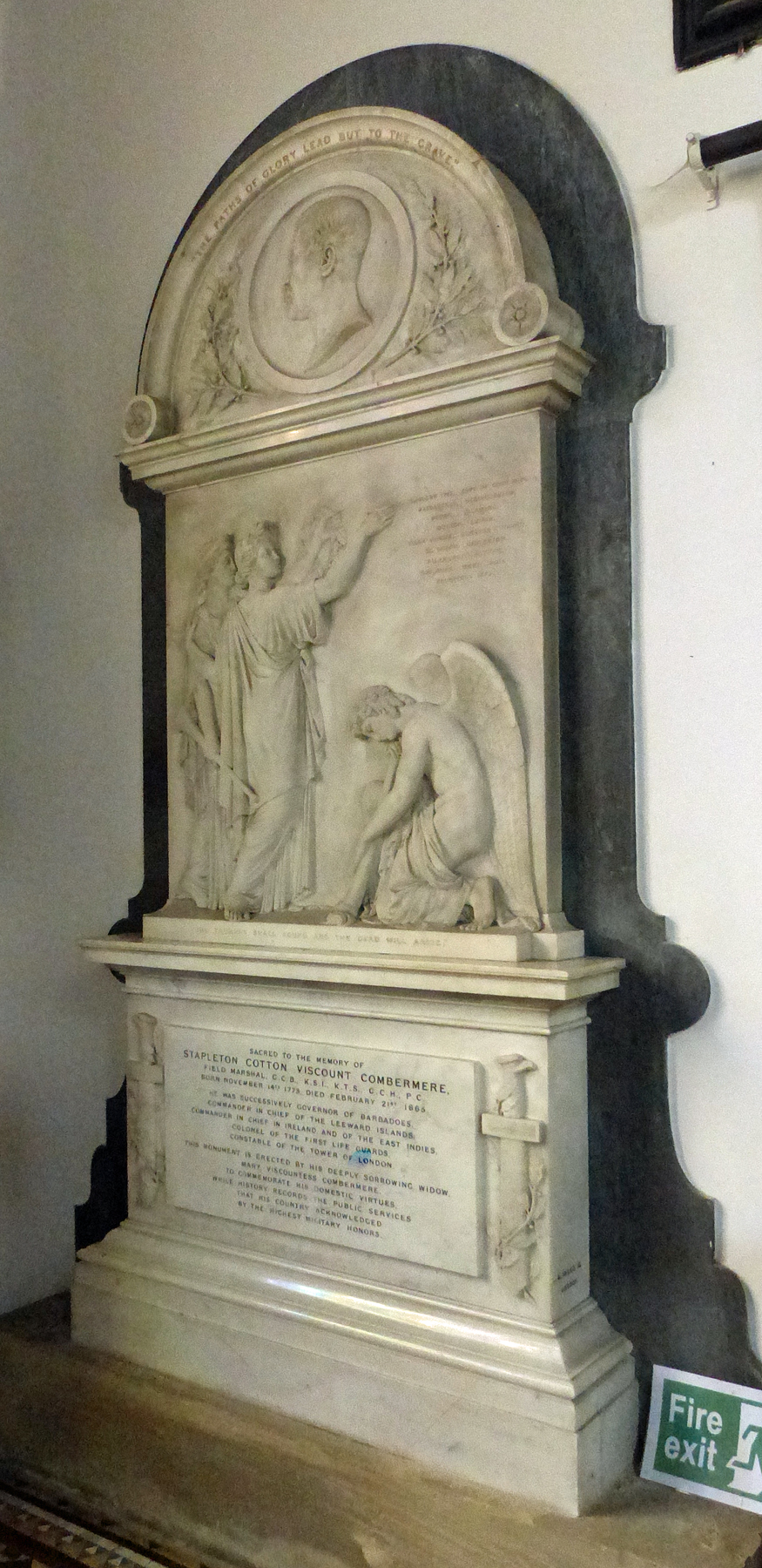
Memorial in St Margaret's Church, Wrenbury

He succeeded Wellington as Constable of the Tower and Lord Lieutenant of the Tower Hamlets in October 1852 and was promoted to field marshal on 2 October 1855. He was appointed a Knight of the Order of the Star of India on 19 August 1861.

Cotton also served as honorary colonel of the 20th Regiment of (Light) Dragoons, and of the 3rd (The King's Own) Regiment of (Light) Dragoons and then as honorary colonel of the 1st Regiment of Life Guards. He died at Colchester House in Clifton on 21 February 1865 aged 91 and was buried at St Margaret's Church, Wrenbury. An equestrian statue in bronze, the work of Carlo, Baron Marochetti, was raised in his honour at Chester by the inhabitants of Cheshire in October 1865. An obelisk was also erected in his memory on the edge of Combermere Park in 1890. Combermere was succeeded by his only son, Wellington Henry Stapleton-Cotton.

== Slave ownership ==
According to the Centre for the Study of the Legacies of British Slavery, Combermere was paid compensation as a slave owner by the British government in the aftermath of the Slavery Abolition Act 1833. Combermere was associated with two claims in 1835 and 1836, which together were awarded £7,195 in payment (worth £740,466 in 2025) for a total of 420 enslaved people on his estates on Saint Kitts and Nevis.

== Family ==
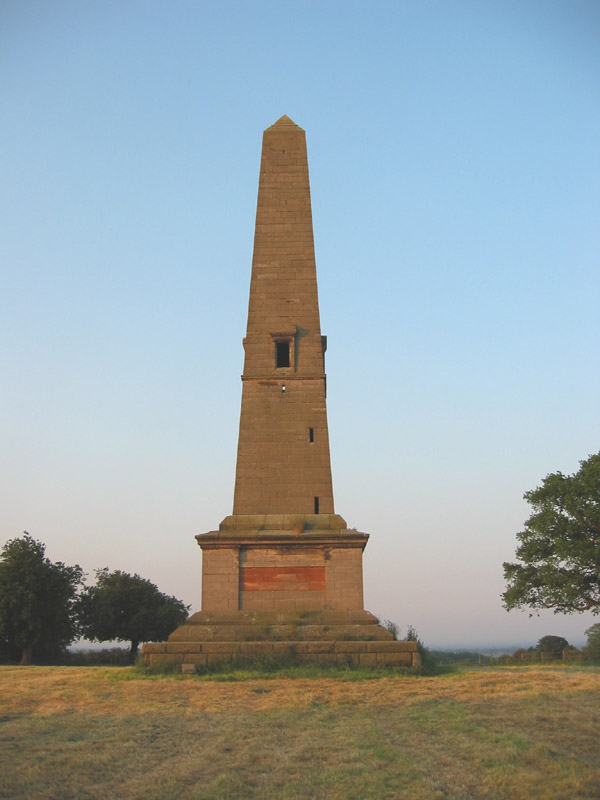
A memorial obelisk in Combermere Park, near Whitchurch, Shropshire.

Combermere was married three times:

- On 1 January 1801, Lady Anna Maria Clinton (d. 31 May 1807), daughter of Thomas Pelham-Clinton, 3rd Duke of Newcastle. They had three children:

- Robert Henry Stapleton Cotton (18 January 1802 – 1821)
- a son who died young
- another son who died young.

- On 22 June 1814, Caroline Greville (d. 25 January 1837), daughter of Captain William Fulke Greville. They had three children:

- Wellington Henry Stapleton-Cotton, 2nd Viscount Combermere (1818–1891)
- Hon. Caroline Stapleton-Cotton (b. 1815), who in 1837 married Arthur Hill, 4th Marquess of Downshire
- Hon. Meliora Emily Anna Maria Cotton, who on 18 June 1853 married John Charles Frederick Hunter

- In 1838, Mary Woolley (née Gibbings), by whom he had no issue.

== Sources ==
- Barthorp, Michael (1990). Wellington's Generals. Osprey Publishing. ISBN 978-0-85045-299-0.
- Burke, Bernard (1869). A Genealogical and Heraldic Dictionary of the Peerage and Baronetage of the British Empire. London: Harrison.
- Heathcote, Tony (1999). The British Field Marshals, 1736–1997: A Biographical Dictionary. Barnsley: Leo Cooper. ISBN 0-85052-696-5.
- Murray, John (1878). Handbook for England and Wales: Alphabetically Arranged for the Use of Travellers ... J. Murray.
- Shand, Alexander Innes (1902). Wellington's Lieutenants. Smith, Elder & Company.
- Stapleton Cotton, Mary Woolley; Stapleton Cotton, Stapleton; Knollys, William Wallingford (1866). Memoirs and Correspondence of Field-marshal Viscount Combermere, from his family papers, by Mary Viscountess Combermere and W.W. Knollys.

Attribution

This article incorporates text from a publication now in the public domain: Chichester, Henry Manners (1887). "Cotton, Stapleton". In Stephen, Leslie (ed.). Dictionary of National Biography. Vol. 12. London: Smith, Elder & Co.

Parliament of the United Kingdom
Preceded by Sir Charles Morice Pole, Bt; Henry Willoughby	Member of Parliament for Newark; 1806–1814; With: Henry Willoughby	Succeeded by Henry Willoughby; George Hay Dawkins-Pennant
Military offices
Preceded by Lord William Bentinck	Colonel of the 20th Regiment of (Light) Dragoons; 1813–1818	Regiment disbanded
Preceded by William Cartwright	Colonel of the 3rd (The King's Own) Regiment of (Light) Dragoons; 1821–1829	Succeeded by Lord George Beresford
Preceded by Francis Edward Gwyn	Governor of Sheerness; 1821–1852	Office abolished
Preceded by Sir Samuel Auchmuty	Commander-in-Chief, Ireland; 1822–1825	Succeeded by Sir George Murray
Preceded by Edward Paget	Commander-in-Chief, India; 1825–1830	Succeeded by George Ramsay
Preceded by The Earl of Harrington	Colonel of the 1st Regiment of Life Guards; 1829–1865	Succeeded by The Earl of Lucan
Government offices
Preceded by John Foster Alleyne, acting	Governor of Barbados; 1817–1820	Succeeded by John Brathwaite Skeete, acting
Honorary titles
Preceded by The Duke of Wellington	Constable of the Tower; Lord Lieutenant of the Tower Hamlets; 1852–1865	Succeeded by Sir John Fox Burgoyne
Peerage of the United Kingdom
New creation	Viscount Combermere; 1827–1865	Succeeded by Wellington Stapleton-Cotton
New creation	Baron Combermere; 1814–1865	Succeeded by Wellington Stapleton-Cotton
Baronetage of England
Preceded by Robert Salusbury Cotton	Baronet (of Combermere); 1809–1865	Succeeded by Wellington Stapleton-Cotton
