= Henry Withers =

British general and politician

Lieutenant-General Henry Withers
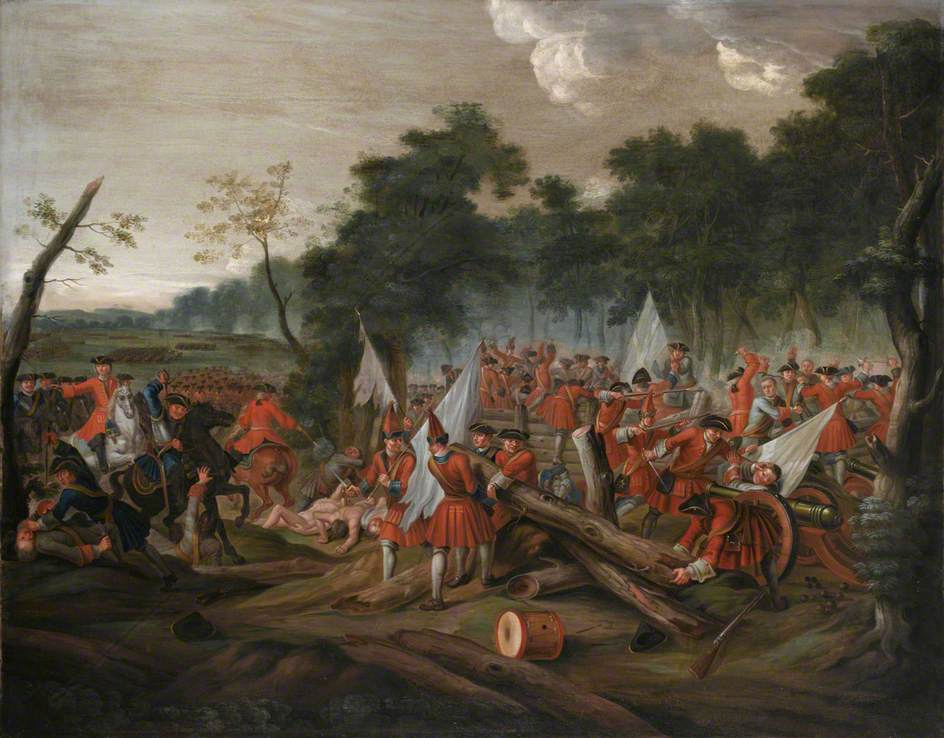
- Withers commanded a detachment of Allied troops at Malplaquet, one of the bloodiest battles of the century

Member of Parliament for Queenborough
- In office 1708–1710

Governor of Sheerness
- In office 1706–1729

Personal details
- Born: c. 1651
- Died: 11 November 1729 (aged 78) Greenwich, London
- Resting place: Westminster Abbey
- Party: Whig
- Occupation: Soldier and politician

Military service
- Years of service: 1678-1729
- Rank: Lieutenant-General
- Unit: Lieutenant-Colonel, First Foot Guards
- Commands: Commander of Foot, Flanders 1712
- Battles/wars: Franco-Dutch War; Battle of Entzheim; Monmouth Rebellion; Sedgemoor; Williamite War in Ireland; The Boyne; Waterford; First Limerick; Nine Years War; Namur 1695; War of the Spanish Succession; Schellenberg; Blenheim; Siege of Tournai; Malplaquet

Henry Withers (c. 1651 – 1729) was a British army officer and politician, who began his career in 1674 during the Franco-Dutch War and reached the rank of Lieutenant General in 1707. A close associate of the Duke of Marlborough during the War of the Spanish Succession, he served in a number of actions, including the 1704 battles of Schellenberg, Blenheim, and Malplaquet in 1709.

== Personal details ==
His background and origins are unknown, although his funeral monument states he was descended from a military family and gives his age as 78, which means he was born in 1651. He never married; his will divided his estate between his sister Elizabeth and his close friend, Colonel Henry Disney, with whom he shared a house in Greenwich and who arranged his burial in Westminster Abbey. His memorial contains lines reportedly written by the poet Alexander Pope, who was a friend of both men. (Note: It reads; Here WITHERS, rest! thou bravest, gentlest mind, thy country's friend, but more of human kind. Oh born to arms! Oh worth in youth approv'd! Oh soft humanity, in age belov'd! For thee the hardy vet'ran drops a tear, And the gay courtier feels his sigh sincere. WITHERS adieu! yet not with thee remove, Thy martial spirit, or thy social love. Amidst corruption, luxury, and rage, Still leave some ancient virtues to our age; Nor let us say (those English glories gone) The last true Briton lies beneath this stone)

== Career ==
He appears to have started his career as part of the British brigade raised for French service during the 1672 to 1678 Franco-Dutch War, whose senior officers included Percy Kirke and John Churchill, later Duke of Marlborough. Although England left the war in February 1674, the Brigade fought at Entzheim in October 1674, where it suffered heavy casualties and was disbanded in early 1675.

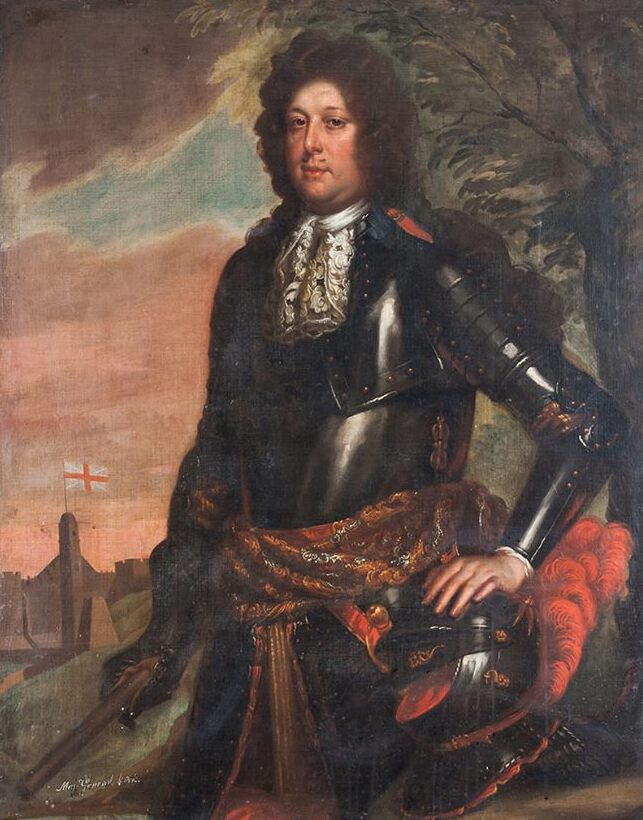
Percy Kirke; Withers served with him from 1674 until Kirke's death in 1691

In 1678, England re-entered the war in alliance with the Dutch Republic, and Withers was commissioned as a Lieutenant in one of the new regiments. The war ended in September 1678 before any of these saw service, and as military posts were scarce, he accepted a demotion to ensign and transferred to the Tangier Garrison in a regiment commanded by Percy Kirke. When Tangier was abandoned in 1684, they became part of the expanded army raised by James II, and fought at Sedgemoor in June 1685; ironically named Kirke's Lambs, the regiment became notorious for the brutality with which it treated captured rebels.

Churchill and Kirke were among the first to defect to William III following the November 1688 Glorious Revolution and were both part of the army sent to Ireland in June 1689. Still serving under Kirke, Withers fought at The Boyne, as well as participating in the Capture of Waterford and the unsuccessful First Siege of Limerick. In April 1691, their unit was transferred to Flanders to serve in the Nine Years War.

Kirke died in October 1691 and Withers found a new patron in the Earl of Romney, who also served in Ireland and was colonel of the First Foot Guards; in February 1695, Romney gave him a commission in his regiment as major, in which role he took part in the capture of Namur later that year. (Note: Under the practice known as double-ranking, Guards officers held a second, higher Army rank; although Withers was a major in the Guards, his substantive rank was Colonel.) When the Peace of Ryswick ended the war in 1697, Withers was Lieutenant-Colonel and effective commander of the regiment, since Romney was absent in Ireland and England from 1692 onwards.

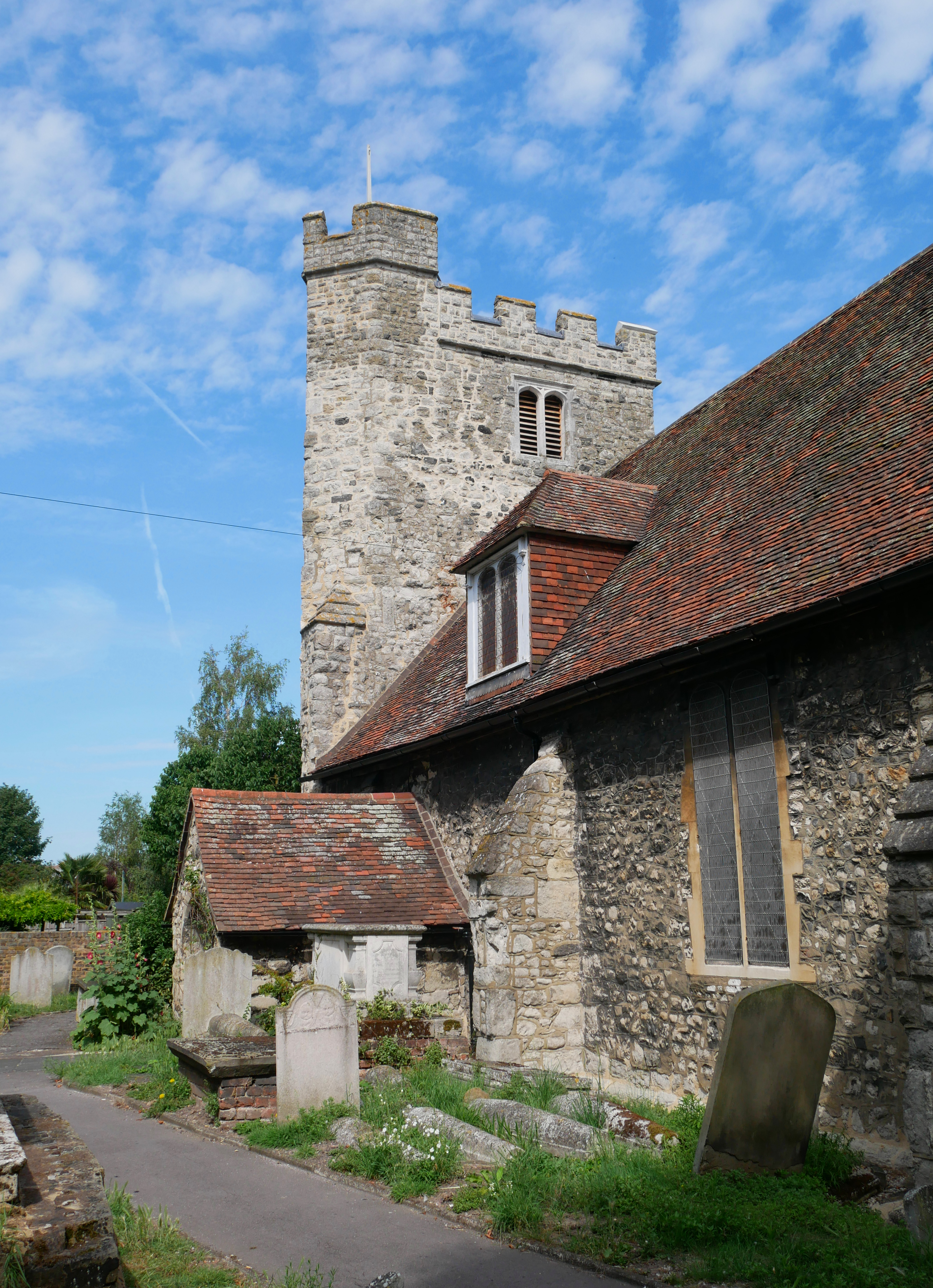
Withers was elected as a Whig MP for Queenborough at the 1708 election, but lost his seat two years later.

With the outbreak of the War of the Spanish Succession in 1701, the army expanded once again and Withers was appointed Brigadier-General in March 1702. During the 1702 and 1703 campaigns in Flanders and the Rhineland, he served under Marlborough, who was Captain General of the army. In April 1704, Romney died and Marlborough became colonel of the First Foot; Withers continued to serve as its Lieutenant-Colonel and was promoted Major General. He commanded a division of infantry at Schellenberg in July and fought at Blenheim in August.

In 1706, Marlborough arranged for Withers to be appointed Governor of Sheerness, a post he held until his death in 1729. This helped him be elected as MP for the nearby seat of Queenborough in the 1708 election. Although listed as a Whig, he spent little time in Parliament and by 1709 was back in Flanders, where he was wounded at the siege of Tournai. He recovered in time to lead a division of reinforcements to join the main army at Malplaquet, with Marlborough delaying his assault until their arrival on 11 September. Their delayed arrival meant his troops played a minor role in the battle, but their appearance convinced the French to retreat.

Despite their long association, when Marlborough fell out with Queen Anne, Withers sided with the Queen. He returned from Flanders in the summer of 1710 but did not stand in the October general election, which resulted in a landslide victory for the pro-peace Tories. He was on good terms with Henry St. John, Secretary of State in the new Harley government; in January 1712, Marlborough was replaced as Captain-General by the Tory Duke of Ormonde, and Withers returned to Flanders as commander of the infantry.

When Anne died in August 1714, there were hopes he would support the Jacobite candidate, James Francis Edward Stuart, but he was strongly committed to the Hanoverian Succession. As a Hanoverian Tory, which included colleagues from his time in the Tangier garrison like Charles Trelawny, he retained his post at Sheerness when George I came to the throne. Although he remained Lieutenant-Colonel of the Foot Guards, he never became colonel and lived quietly at his home in Greenwich until his death in 1729. The lines on his monument in Westminster Abbey were supposedly written by Alexander Pope.

== Sources ==
- Atkinson, CT (1946). "Charles II's regiments in France, 1672 - 1678". Journal of the Society for Army Historical Research. 24 (100). JSTOR 44228420.
- Dalton, Charles (1894). English army lists and commission registers, 1661-1714, Volume II 1685-1689. Eyre & Spottiswoode.
- Dalton, Charles (1904). English army lists and commission registers, 1661-1714, Volume V 1702-1707. Eyre & Spottiswoode.
- Falkner, James (1970). Marlborough's Battlefields. Pen and Sword.
- Handley, Stuart (2002). WITHERS, Henry (c.1651-1729), of Greenwich, Kent in The History of Parliament: the House of Commons 1690–1715. CUP. ISBN 978-1107002258.
- Handley, Stuart (2004). "Withers, Henry (1651/1652-1729)". Oxford Dictionary of National Biography (online ed.). Oxford University Press. doi:10.1093/ref:odnb/63649. (Subscription, Wikipedia Library access or UK public library membership required.)
- Hosford, Stuart (2004). "Sidney, Henry, first earl of Romney (1641-1704)". Oxford Dictionary of National Biography (online ed.). Oxford University Press. doi:10.1093/ref:odnb/25521. (Subscription, Wikipedia Library access or UK public library membership required.)
- Holmes, Richard (2008). Marlborough: Britain's Greatest General: England's Fragile Genius. Harper Press. ISBN 978-0007225712.
- MacDowall, Simon (2020). Malplauquet 1709: Malborough's Bloodiest Battle. Osprey Publishing. ISBN 978-1472841230.
- Smith, Hannah (2021). Armies and Political Change in Britain, 1660-1750. Oxford University Press.
- Springman, Michael (2008). The Guards Brigade in the Crimea (2014 ed.). Pen and Sword. ISBN 978-1844156788.
- Wauchope, Piers (2004). "Kirke, Percy (died 1691)". Oxford Dictionary of National Biography (online ed.). Oxford University Press. doi:10.1093/ref:odnb/15664. (Subscription, Wikipedia Library access or UK public library membership required.)
