= Philip Honywood (British Army officer, died 1752) =

British Army general

General Sir Philip Honywood KB
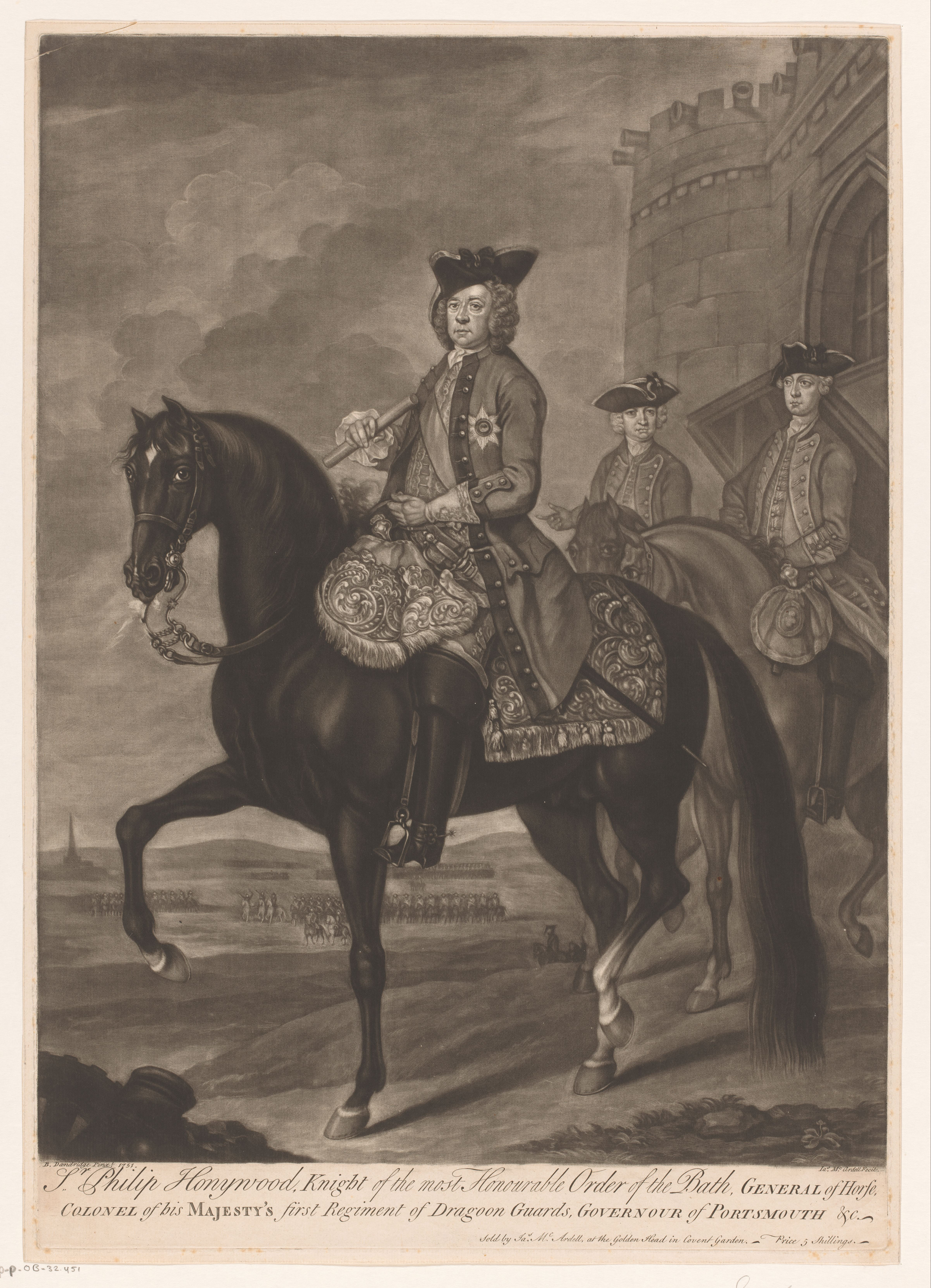
- Portrait Bartholomew Dandridge
- Born: c. 1677
- Died: 17 June 1752

General Sir Philip Honywood KB (also spelt Honeywood; c. 1677 – 17 June 1752) was a British Army officer.

== Biography ==
He was born the second son of Charles Ludovic Honywood of Charing, Kent and Mary Clement. Sir Robert Honywood was his grandfather: Sir Robert married Frances Vane, daughter of Sir Henry Vane the Elder.

His father died when Philip was about ten. He entered the Army as an ensign in James Stanley's regiment of foot on 12 June 1694, and served under King William III in the Netherlands. He was promoted to captain in the Royal Fusiliers on 1 April 1696, and captain in the Earl of Huntingdon's newly raised regiment on 10 March 1702. In the reign of Queen Anne he shared in the toils and dangers of two campaigns in Brabant under John Churchill, 1st Duke of Marlborough, and afterwards transferred his services to Spain. He was rewarded for his excellent conduct with the lieutenant-colonelcy of the regiment, now Wade's (and later the 33rd). On 27 May 1709 he was promoted to the colonelcy of the 92nd Regiment, which was disbanded in 1712, and in 1710 he obtained the rank of brigadier-general.

He was a zealous and warm-hearted advocate for the Protestant succession, and on the formation of a new ministry which was believed to be favourable to the interests of the Pretender, Honywood, Lieutenant-General Meredith and Major-General Macartney were guilty of drinking at a public dinner in Flanders the toast of "Damnation and confusion to the new Ministry, and to those who had any hand in turning out the old", and they received an]official intimation that the Queen had no further occasion for their services. Four years afterwards a change of monarch took place: the ministers who had induced the Queen to deprive him of his commission were charged with high treason and fled to France, and Brigadier-General Honywood was rewarded for his attachment to the House of Hanover with the post of Groom of the Bedchamber in the household of the new King George I. He also received a commission on 22 July 1715 to raise, form and discipline a corps of cavalry, later the 11th Hussars. He served at the head of his regiment during the rebellion of the Earl of Mar, commanded a brigade at Preston, and was wounded at the storming of one of the avenues of the town, on which occasion he evinced signal valour and judgement.

In 1719 Honywood commanded a brigade in the expedition against Spain, under Lieutenant-General Lord Cobham. He took possession of the town of Vigo with eight hundred men, and was afterwards engaged in the siege of the citadel, which surrendered in a few days. He was promoted to the rank of major-general in 1726, and in 1727 he was placed on the staff of the army held in readiness to embark for Holland. On 29 May 1732, after commanding the 11th Dragoons seventeen years, he was removed to the 3rd Dragoons, and in 1735 he was promoted to the rank of lieutenant-general.

In 1742 a British force was sent to Flanders under Honywood, who held the chief command of the troops until the arrival of the Earl of Stair. In the following year he was promoted to the rank of general, and on 18 April 1743 he was appointed colonel of the King's Horse, later 1st Dragoon Guards. At the battle of Dettingen one division of the army was commanded by Honywood, and he led the Royal Horse Guards and the King's Horse to the charge with great gallantry. He served in the subsequent campaigns on the Continent with distinction, and with the approbation of his Sovereign, by whom he was advanced to the dignity of Knight of the Order of the Bath. He died in 1752, and was interred with military honours at Portsmouth, of which place he was Governor at the time of his decease.

Military offices
Preceded by Roger Townshend	Colonel of Honywood's Regiment of Foot; 1709–1710	Succeeded by Jasper Clayton
Preceded by New regiment	Colonel of Honywood's Regiment of Dragoons; 1715–1732	Succeeded by Lord Mark Kerr
Preceded by Robert Sterne	Governor of Duncannon Fort; 1728–1735	Succeeded by The Lord Cathcart
Preceded by The Lord Carpenter	Colonel of the King's Regiment of Dragoons; 1732–1743	Succeeded by Humphrey Bland
Preceded by Rich Russell	Governor of Berwick-upon-Tweed; 1735–1740	Succeeded by Thomas Whetham
Preceded by The Viscount Shannon	Governor of Portsmouth; 1740–1752	Succeeded by Henry Hawley
Preceded by The Earl of Pembroke	Colonel of the King's Regiment of Horse; 1743–1752	Succeeded by Humphrey Bland
