= Lawers =

Coordinates: 56.527950°N 4.152436°W

Lawers: Scottish Gaelic: Labhar
- Location within Perth and Kinross
- OS grid reference: NN677394
- Council area: Perth and Kinross
- Country: Scotland
- Sovereign state: United Kingdom
- Post town: ABERFELDY
- Postcode district: PH15
- Dialling code: 01887
- Police: Scotland
- Fire: Scottish
- Ambulance: Scottish
- UK Parliament: Angus and Perthshire Glens
- Scottish Parliament: Perthshire North

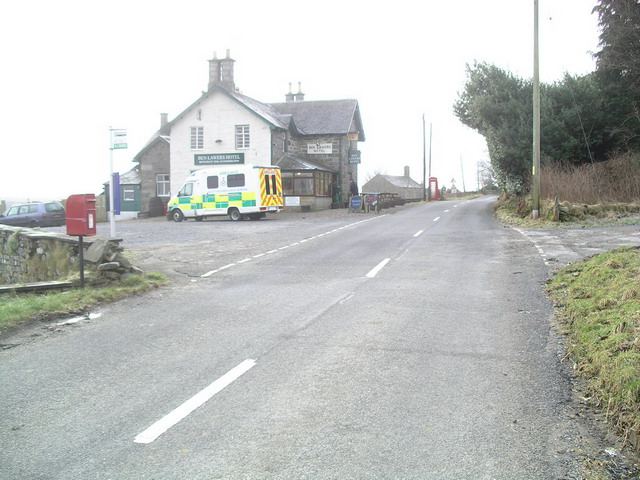
The Ben Lawers Hotel

Lawers /ˈlɔːrz/ is a village situated in rural Perthshire, Scotland. It lies on the banks of Loch Tay and at the foot of Ben Lawers. It was once part of a vibrant farming industry in the area.

== Notable people ==
The Lady of Lawers lived most of her adult life there, and is buried in the old village ruins.

The last known native speaker of Perthshire Gaelic, Elizabeth Christina McDiarmaid, was born in Lawers and spent most of here life here. She died at 92 years old in April 2024 at the Falls of Dochart Care Home in nearby Killin.
