= Mid Cheshire Ridge =

Range of hills in North West England

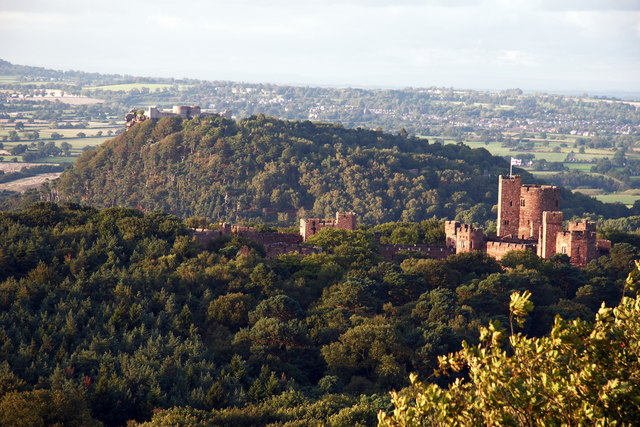
Peckforton ridge, with Beeston (left) and Peckforton (right) castles. The Beeston Gap is on the far left

The Mid Cheshire Ridge, sometimes referred to as the Cheshire Sandstone Ridge, is a range of low sandstone hills which stretch north to south through Cheshire in North West England. The ridge is discontinuous, with the hills forming two main blocks, north and south of the "Beeston Gap". The main mass of those to the south are known as the Peckforton Hills; the larger group of hills to the north do not have a collective name. The Cheshire Sandstone Ridge was shortlisted for AONB designation in 2021.

== Significant summits ==
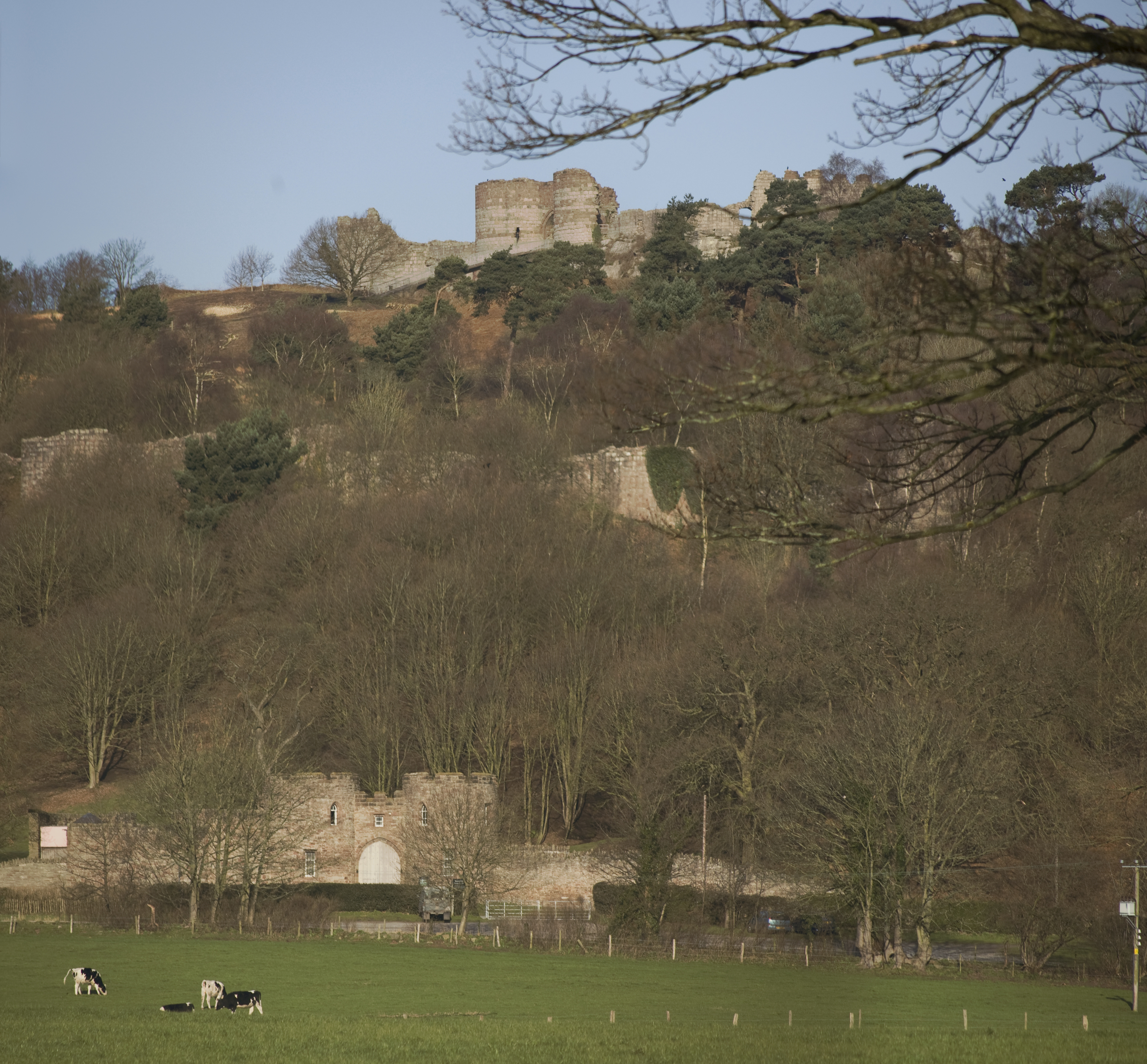
Beeston Castle hill

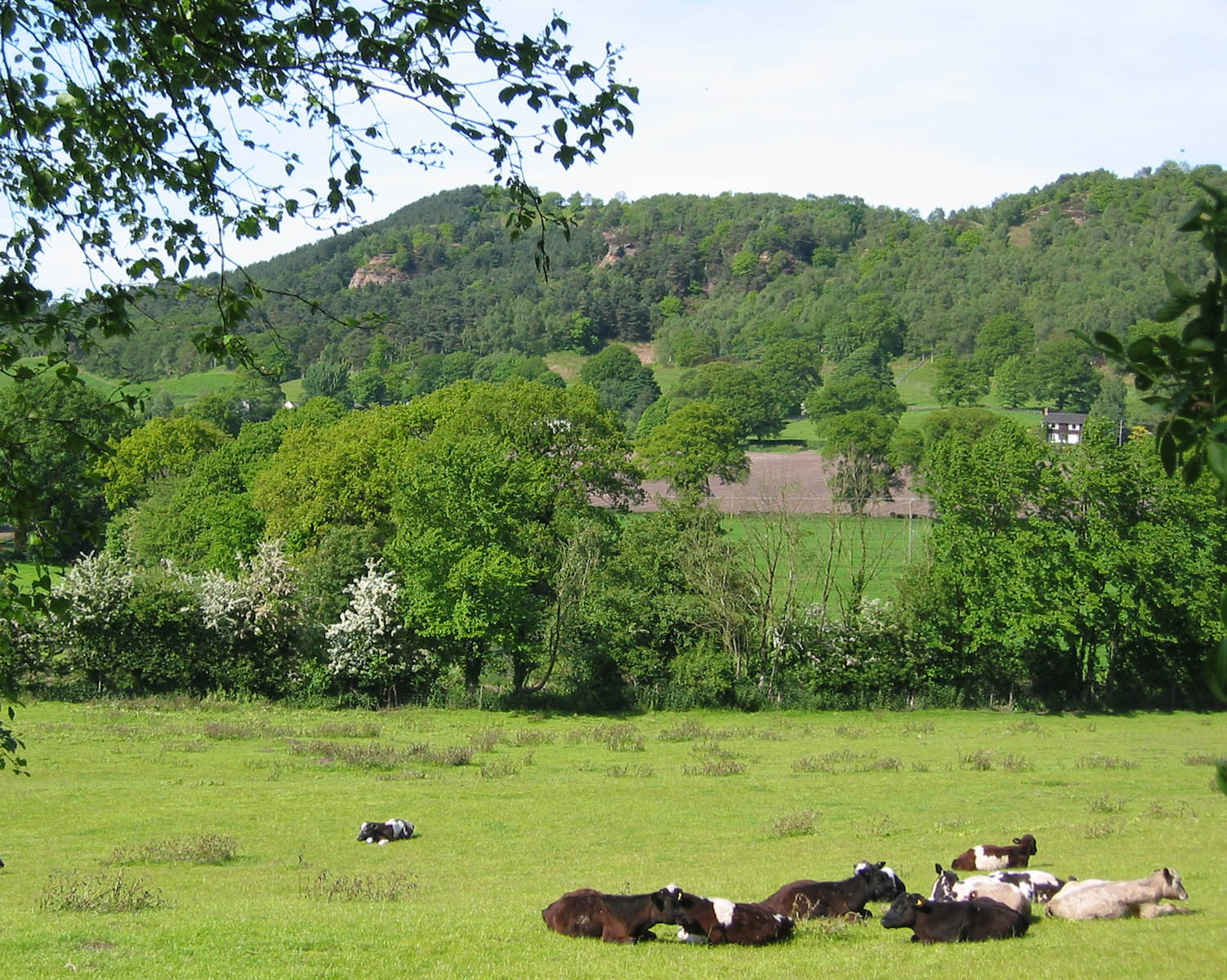
Raw Head

The ridge attains its highest elevation at Raw Head in the Peckforton Hills, some 227 m above sea level. Other significant summits and the parishes within which they lie, are from north to south:

- Beacon Hill (150 m), 53.2846°N 2.7222°W (Frodsham)
- Woodhouse Hill (145 m), 53.2763°N 2.7352°W (Frodsham)
- Helsby Hill (140 m), 53.2737°N 2.7635°W (Helsby)
- Alvanley Cliff (135 m), 53.2597°N 2.7356°W (Alvanley)
- Birch Hill (158 m), 53.2591°N 2.7180°W (Manley)
- Old Pale (176 m), 53.2217°N 2.6854°W (Delamere)
- Eddisbury Hill (158 m), 53.2200°N 2.6720°W (Delamere)
- Primrosehill (158 m), 53.2083°N 2.6955°W (Delamere)
- High Billinge (175 m), 53.1910°N 2.6679°W (Utkinton)
- Luddington Hill (145 m), 53.1766°N 2.6522°W (Utkinton)
  - (Beeston Gap)
- Beeston Castle Hill (155 m), 53.1288°N 2.6935°W (Beeston)
- Stanner Nab (200 m), 53.1109°N 2.7016°W (Peckforton)
- Peckforton Point (203 m), 53.0968°N 2.7028°W (Peckforton)
- Burwardsley Hill (186 m), 53.0952°N 2.7092°W (Burwardsley)
- Bulkeley Hill (220 m), 53.0925°N 2.7077°W (Bulkeley)
- Raw Head (227 m), 53.0763°N 2.7441°W (Bickerton and Harthill)
- Bickerton Hill (south) (193 m), 53.0756°N 2.7459°W (Bickerton)
- Maiden Castle (210 m), 53.0709°N 2.7512°W (Bickerton & Duckington)

== Geology ==
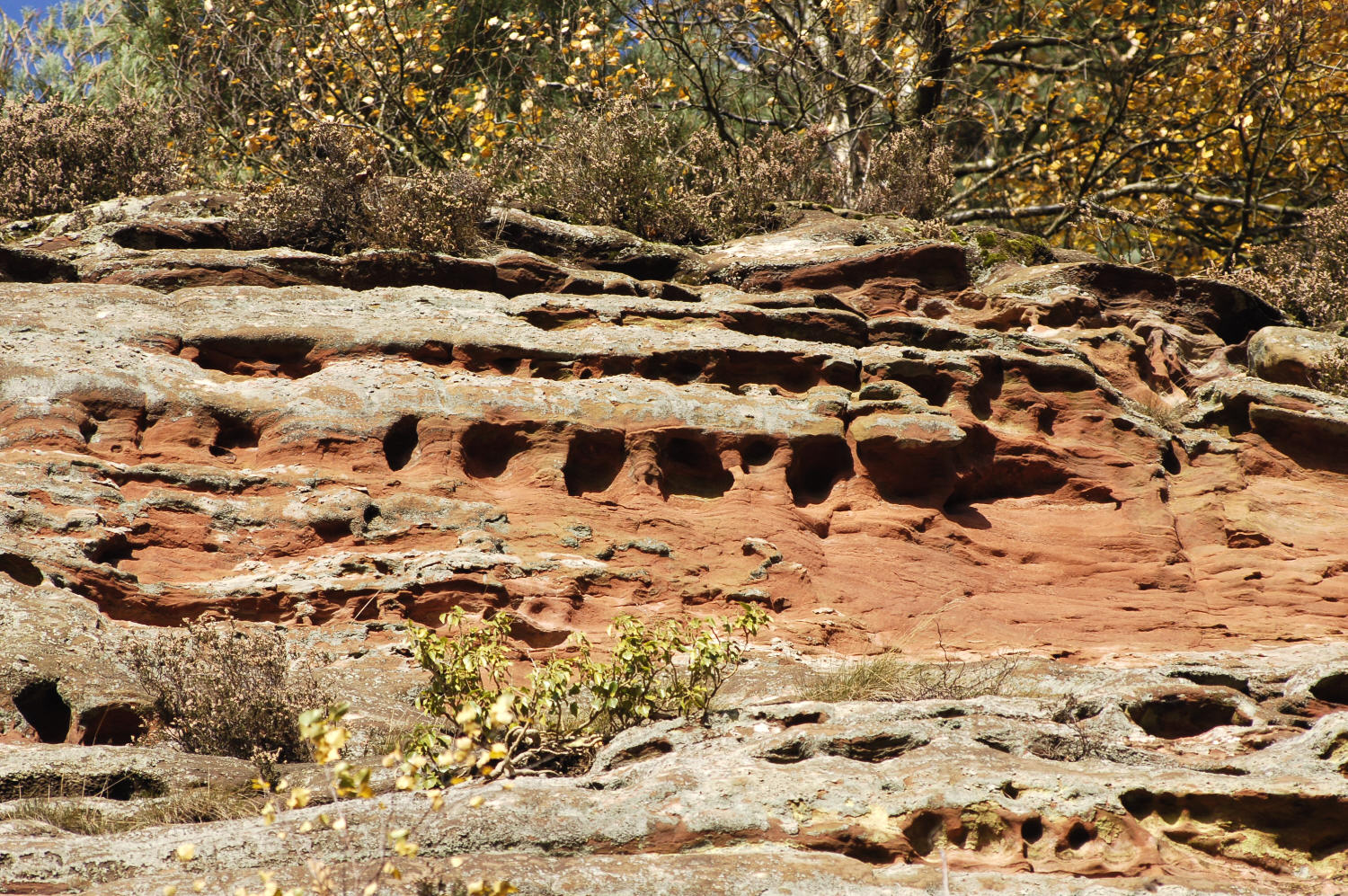
Sandstone detail

The hills are composed of a range of sandstones of Permian and Triassic age. North–south faulting is in part responsible for elevating harder-wearing strata above the general level of the Cheshire Plain. Typically the higher summits are formed from the Helsby Sandstone.

The ridge acted as something of a barrier to the passage of Irish Sea ice during the last ice age and its hills are etched with numerous glacial meltwater channels, many of which formed subglacially. Particularly spectacular examples are those at Urchin's Kitchen in Primrosehill Woods and at Holbitch Slack near Cotebrook.

== Hill forts ==
A series of Iron Age hillforts adorn the ridge from Woodhouse Hill and Helsby Hill in the north through Eddisbury and Kelsborrow Castle to Maiden Castle in the south.

== Recreation ==
The ridge is traversed by the popular Sandstone Trail, a middle-distance recreational route originally established by the former Cheshire County Council between Beacon Hill and Grindley Brook on the Shropshire border but now extended into Frodsham to the north and Whitchurch to the south. Sections of the Delamere Way, Longster Trail and Eddisbury Way also explore parts of the ridge.

Numerous of the woods along the ridge have been used for orienteering competitions over the years. Horseriding is also popular in the area, as it is traversed by a number of bridleways, byways and green lanes.

== See also ==
- Geology of Alderley Edge
