= List of recreational walks in Cheshire =

This is a list of recreational walks in the ceremonial county of Cheshire. The list includes walks that are wholly inside Cheshire and also those that pass through to another county. The walks are generally through countryside on a variety of trails and footpaths. Small walks of local interest only are not included. There are 1,864 miles (3,000 km) of public rights of way in Cheshire, England.

== List of walking trails in Cheshire ==
Name	Image	Route	Length	Notes	Refs
Baker Way		Chester to Delamere Forest	13 miles (19 km)	Starts at Chester railway station and finishes at Delamere railway station	
Bishop Bennet Way		Beeston to Wirswall	34 miles (55 km)		
Bollin Valley Way		Macclesfield to Partington	25 miles (40 km)	Follows the River Bollin	
Cheshire Ring		Dukinfield and Marple	97-mile (156 km)	Circular walk alongside six canals	
Crewe and Nantwich Circular Walk		Crewe and Nantwich	29 miles (47 km)	A circular walk around the two towns	
Dane Valley Way		Buxton to Northwich	48 miles (77 km)	Between Derbyshire and Cheshire partly along the River Dane	
Delamere Way		Frodsham to Stockton Heath	21 miles (33 km)	Goes via Delamere Forest	
Eddisbury Way		Frodsham to Burwardsley	16 miles (26 km)	Links up with the Sandstone Trail	
Goyt Way		Etherow Country Park to Whaley Bridge	10 miles (16 km)	Links up with Midshires Way	
Great English Walk		Chepstow to Berwick-upon-Tweed	583 miles (938 km)	Passes through Cheshire between the Shropshire border at Grindley Brook and the Staffordshire border near Congleton	
Gritstone Trail		Disley to Kidsgrove, Staffordshire	35 miles (56 km)	Passes through Teggs Nose Country Park	
Ladybrook Valley Interest Trail		Disley to Cheadle	12 miles (20 km)	Finishes at the National Trust's Lyme Park	
Longster Trail		Helsby Hill to Chester	10 miles (16 km)		
Maelor Way		Bronygarth to Whitchurch	24 miles (39 km)	Finishes in Shropshire	
Marches Way		Chester railway station to Cardiff	200 miles (320 km)	Initially following the River Dee to Farndon, then passing through the border counties	
Middlewood Way		Macclesfield to Marple	10 miles (16 km)		
Midshires Way		Bledlow, Buckinghamshire, to Stockport	230 miles (370 km)		
North Cheshire Way		Hooton to Disley	71 miles (114 km)	Linking the Wirral Way, Sandstone Trail and Gritstone Trail	
Peak District Boundary Walk		Buxton circular	190 miles (310 km)	The Cheshire section is between the Dane Valley near Wincle and past Lyme Park towards Whaley Bridge	
Salter's Way		Rudheath (near Northwich) to Jenkin Chapel, Rainow	25 miles (40 km)		
Sandstone Trail		Frodsham to Whitchurch, Shropshire	34 miles (55 km)		
South Cheshire Way		Grindley Brook to Mow Cop	32 miles (51 km)	Can be used as a link between the Sandstone Trail and the Gritstone Trail	
Trans Pennine Trail		Southport to Hornsea	207 miles (333 km)	From Yorkshire to Merseyside passing through Widnes	
Two Saints Way		Chester to Lichfield	92 miles		
Weaver Way		Frodsham to Audlem	40 miles (65 km)	Via the River Weaver, the Trent and Mersey Canal and Shropshire Union Canal	
Wirral Way		Wirral		A circular trail around the Wirral Peninsula taking in part of West Cheshire and Hadlow Road railway station	

== See also ==
- Long-distance footpaths in the UK
- List of parks and open spaces in Cheshire
- Recreational trails in the Peak District
