= Marches Way =

218-mile footpath in Wales and England

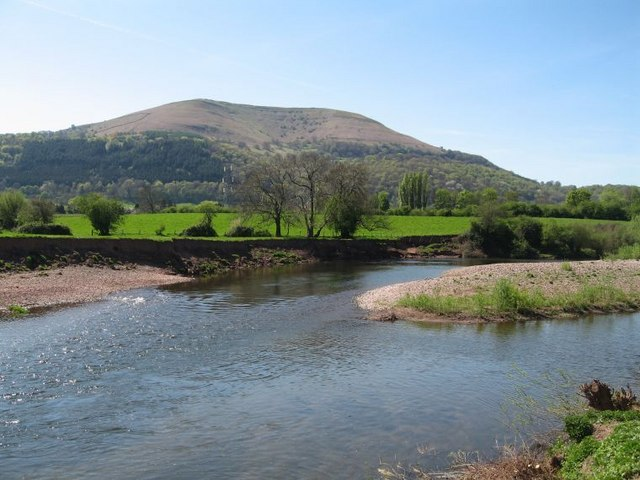
- The trail follows the River Usk near Abergavenny
- Length: 218 mi (351 km)
- Location: Wales & Midlands, England
- Trailheads: Chester; 53.1969°N 2.8799°W; Cardiff; 51.485°N 3.184°W
- Use: Hiking
- Season: All year

The Marches Way is a partially waymarked long-distance footpath in the United Kingdom. It runs for 351 kilometres (218 mi) through the Welsh–English borderlands, traditionally known as the Welsh Marches, and links the cities of Chester in the north and Cardiff in the south.

== The route ==
The route starts at Chester at Chester railway station and then follows the valley of the River Dee southwards, before turning east into Malpas, Cheshire, and down to Whitchurch, Shropshire, before roughly following the B5476 road south to Shrewsbury via Wem. Once past Shrewsbury, the path scales the Long Mynd before reaching Church Stretton and Wenlock Edge and then entering Craven Arms, where there are excellent views of Flounder's Folly. The path then passes Stokesay Castle as it heads towards Ludlow. From Ludlow the route winds through the Mortimer Forest as it heads towards Leominster. From here the path climbs Dinmore Hill, crossing the A49 road as it navigates towards Hereford. The path passes through the town centre of Hereford, picking up the River Wye before heading towards Abbey Dore and Abergavenny where the path skirts the outer edge of the Brecon Beacons National Park, climbing and running along the ridge of the Skirrid mountain. The way then follows the Monmouthshire and Brecon Canal to Pontypool before heading towards Caerleon and Newport via the Llandegfedd Reservoir. Finally, the path heads towards its end point at Cardiff Central Railway Station via Caerphilly Common and Castell Coch at Tongwynlais.

It links many of the most important historic sites on both sides of the border, drawing together the history from Roman times, passing through two important Roman forts (Isca Augusta and Burrium), and the turbulent medieval periods when the border lands were contentious power bases vied over by Marcher Lords, Welsh princes and the scenes of rebellions, bloodletting and political power-broking by many of the region's historical characters.

The terrain of the footpath varies greatly as it proceeds from Chester to Cardiff, passing through the flat Cheshire Plain to the steep Shropshire Hills and the mountains of South Wales. The path passes through many woods, forests, riverbanks and farmland along its journey.

The route is waymarked only in Cheshire, with black and white waymarker discs.

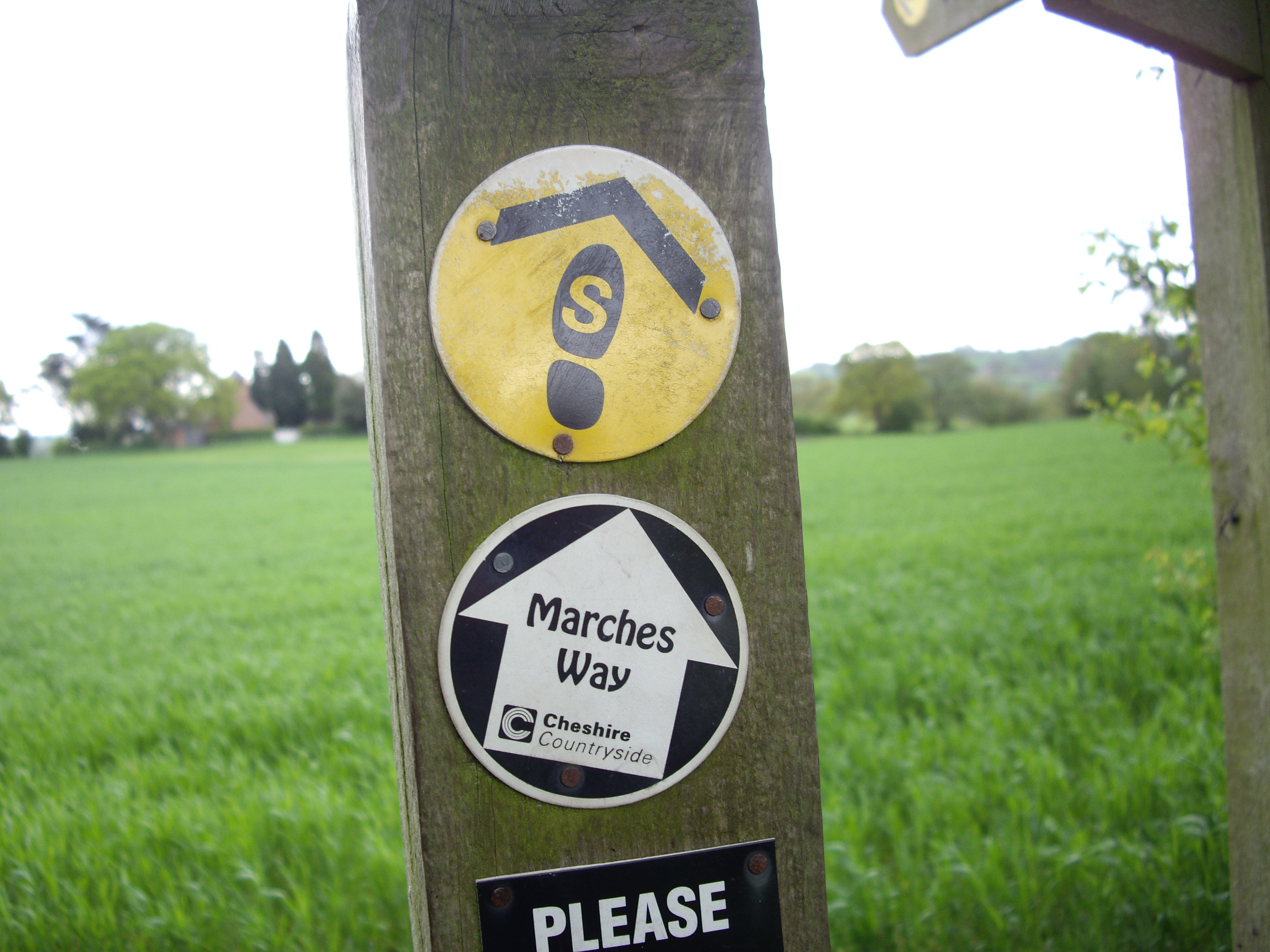
The distinctive waymarks of the Marches Way and Sandstone Trail near Old St. Chads Chapel, Tushingham, Cheshire.

== Linked footpaths ==
The route crosses many different trails along its length, including:

- The North Cheshire Way (Chester Spur) at Chester railway station
- The Baker Way at Chester railway station
- The Sandstone Trail at Tushingham (going past Old St. Chad's Chapel)
- The Maelor Way and South Cheshire Way at Grindley Brook
- The Shropshire Way at various points in Shropshire
- The Mortimer Trail in the Mortimer Forest, Herefordshire
- The Black and White Trail at Leominster
- The Herefordshire Trail at various points in Herefordshire
- The Offa's Dyke Path and the Beacons Way at Pandy
- The Taff Trail at Tongwynlais, Cardiff

== Mapping ==
The Marches Way was removed from the Ordnance Survey map series in 2004 after being detailed on these particular maps for approximately five years. The Ordnance Survey maps that included the Marches Way between 1999 and 2004 were:

- OS Explorer OL13 – Brecon Beacons National Park (East)
- OS Explorer 151 – Cardiff and Bridgend
- OS Explorer 152 – Newport and Pontypool
- OS Explorer 166 – Rhondda and Merthyr Tydfil
- OS Explorer 189 – Hereford and Ross-on-Wye
- OS Explorer 202 – Leominster and Bromyard
- OS Explorer 203 – Ludlow, Tenbury Wells and Cleobury Mortimer
- OS Explorer 217 – The Long Mynd and Wenlock Edge
- OS Explorer 241 – Shrewsbury
- OS Explorer 257 – Crewe and Nantwich
- OS Explorer 266 – Chester and the Wirral
- OS Landranger 117 – Chester and Wrexham
- OS Landranger 126 – Shrewsbury and Oswestry
- OS Landranger 137 – Church Stretton and Ludlow
- OS Landranger 138 – Kidderminster and Wyre Forest
- OS Landranger 148 – Presteigne and Hay-on-Wye
- OS Landranger 149 – Hereford and Leominster
- OS Landranger 161 – The Black Mountains
- OS Landranger 171 – Cardiff and Newport

== See also ==
- List of recreational walks in Cheshire
