= Eddisbury Way =

Walking route in Cheshire, England

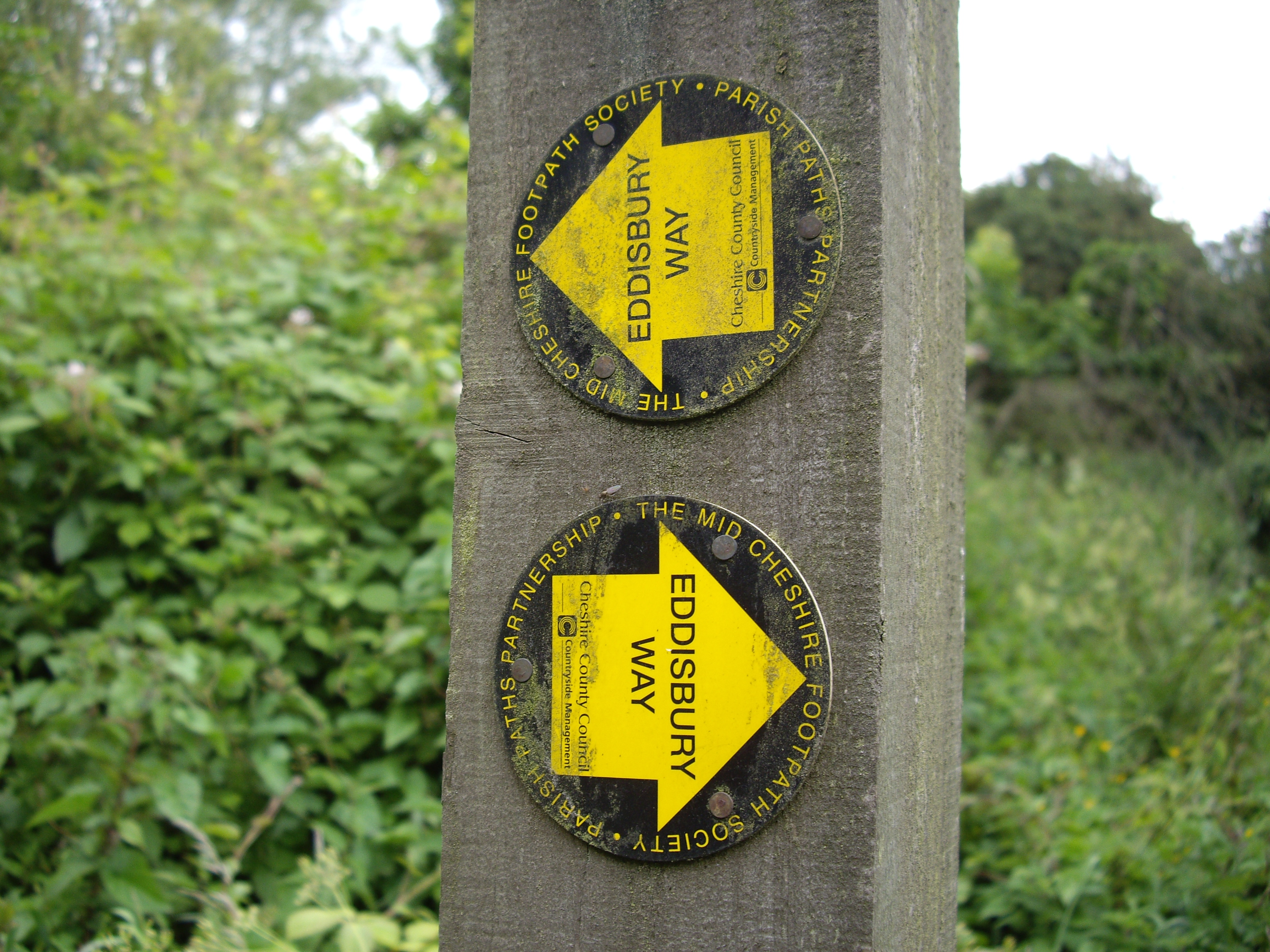
- A pair of Eddisbury Way waymarks near Brines Brow picnic area, Delamere Forest
- Length: 16.5 mi (26.6 km)
- Location: Cheshire, England
- Trailheads: Frodsham SJ530784; Higher Burwardsley SJ525567
- Use: Hiking
- Season: All year

The Eddisbury Way is a footpath running from Frodsham to Higher Burwardsley within the English county of Cheshire. The total length of the trail is 16.5 miles (26.6 km). The path is waymarked with yellow arrows containing the words Eddisbury Way.

== The route ==
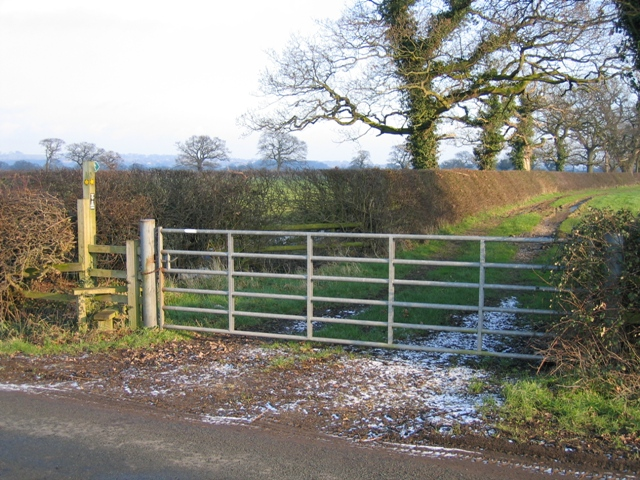
The Eddisbury Way near Hoofield

The route starts at the Runcorn side of Frodsham at the bridge that crosses the River Weaver. It then proceeds to Bradley, Fivecrosses and Newton before skirting around the edge of Delamere Forest at Manley. The path then follows Dark Ark Lane to Brines Brow picnic area before progressing through Kelsall, Duddon, Burton, Hoofield and Huxley to its conclusion at Higher Burwardsley. The route is shown on Ordnance Survey Explorer maps 257 and 267.

The path crosses the Baker Way at Brines Brow picnic area, the Delamere Way near the former Crossley hospital at Manley and the Sandstone Trail in Higher Burwardsley, which incidentally is the end-point of the Eddisbury Way.

This is one of several routes with end-points in the Helsby/Frodsham area, others being the Delamere Way, the Sandstone Trail and the Longster Trail.

== See also ==
- List of recreational walks in Cheshire
