= Holy Trinity Church, Bickerton =

Coordinates: 53.0769°N 2.7327°W

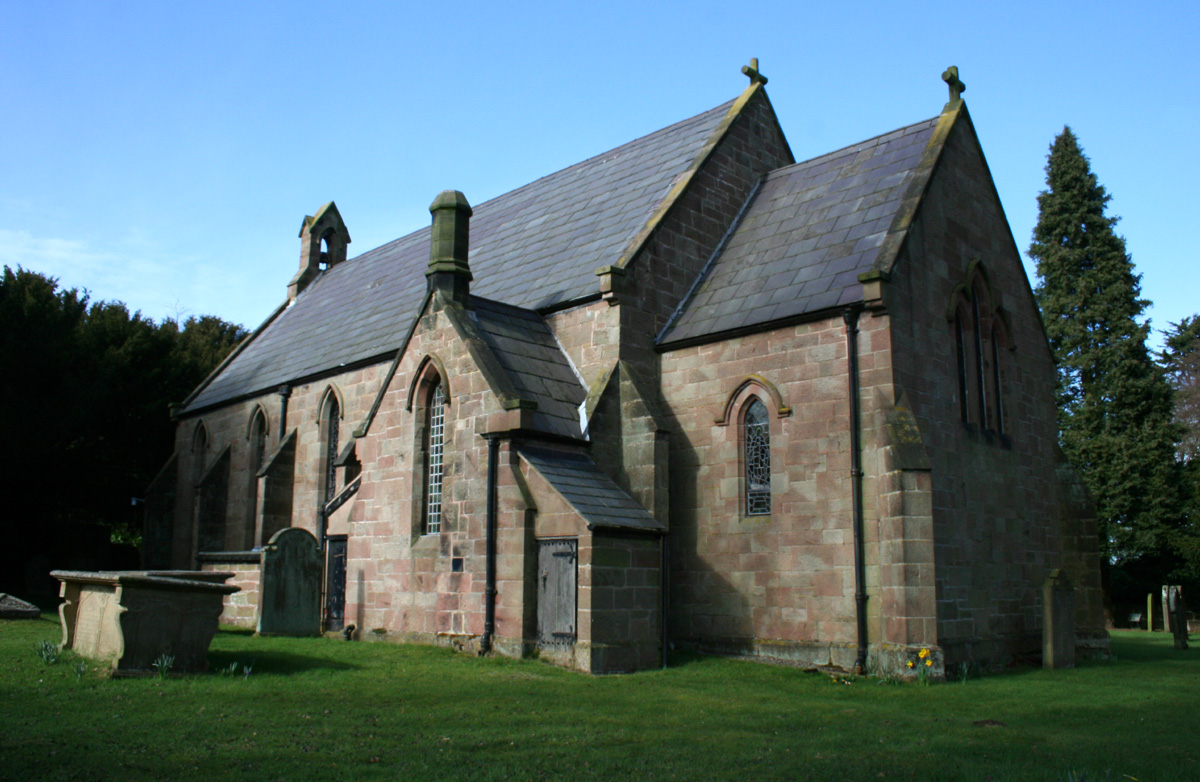
- Holy Trinity Church, Bickerton, from the southeast

- Location in Cheshire
- OS grid reference: SJ 510,535
- Location: Bickerton, Cheshire
- Country: England
- Denomination: Anglican
- Website: Holy Trinity, Bickerton

History
- Status: Parish church
- Dedication: Trinity
- Consecrated: 7 January 1840

Architecture
- Functional status: Active
- Heritage designation: Grade II
- Designated: 12 January 1967
- Architect: Edmund Sharpe
- Architectural type: Church
- Style: Gothic Revival
- Groundbreaking: 1839
- Completed: 1911
- Construction cost: £700 (£63,000 in 2025)

Specifications
- Materials: Red sandstone, slate roof

Administration
- Province: York
- Diocese: Chester
- Archdeaconry: Chester
- Deanery: Malpas
- Parish: Holy Trinity, Bickerton

Clergy
- Rector: Rev. Dr. Janine Arnott

Holy Trinity Church stands to the north of the village of Bickerton, Cheshire, England. The church is recorded in the National Heritage List for England as a designated Grade II listed building. It is an active Anglican parish church in the diocese of Chester, the archdeaconry of Chester, and the deanery of Malpas. Its benefice is combined with those of St Wenefrede, Bickley, St John, Burwardsley and All Saints, Harthill.

== History ==
The church was built as a chapel of ease to St Oswald's Church, Malpas in 1839 and was designed by the Lancaster architect Edmund Sharpe. The land for the church was given by Philip Grey Egerton. Public subscription raised £2,000. £700 of this (equivalent to £63,000 in 2025) was used to build the church, £300 was used for a minister's house, and the rest was invested to provide a stipend for the minister. A grant of £120 was provided by the Incorporated Church Building Society. The church provided 268 seats. It was consecrated by John Sumner, Bishop of Chester, on 7 January 1840. Holy Trinity became a separate parish church in 1869. A chancel was added in 1875–76 and a baptistry in 1911.

== Architecture ==
=== Exterior ===
The church is built in red sandstone with a slate roof. Its plan consists of a three-bay nave, a single-bay chancel and a small octagonal west baptistry. The vestry projection to the north and the organ chamber to the south give the church a cruciform plan. The baptistry has a pyramidal roof.

=== Interior ===
The reredos is made of panelled oak. Also in oak are the pulpit, the organ case and the lectern. The octagonal font is in stone. On the nave walls are memorials in alabaster to former vicars of the church. The stained glass in the baptistry is by Kempe and is dated around 1904; there is another window by Kempe on the south side of the church. There are also two windows dating from about 1940 by Trena Cox. The two-manual organ was built by P. Conacher and Company of Huddersfield.

== See also ==
- Listed buildings in Bickerton
- List of architectural works by Edmund Sharpe
