= St John's Church, Burwardsley =

Coordinates: 53.1035°N 2.7251°W

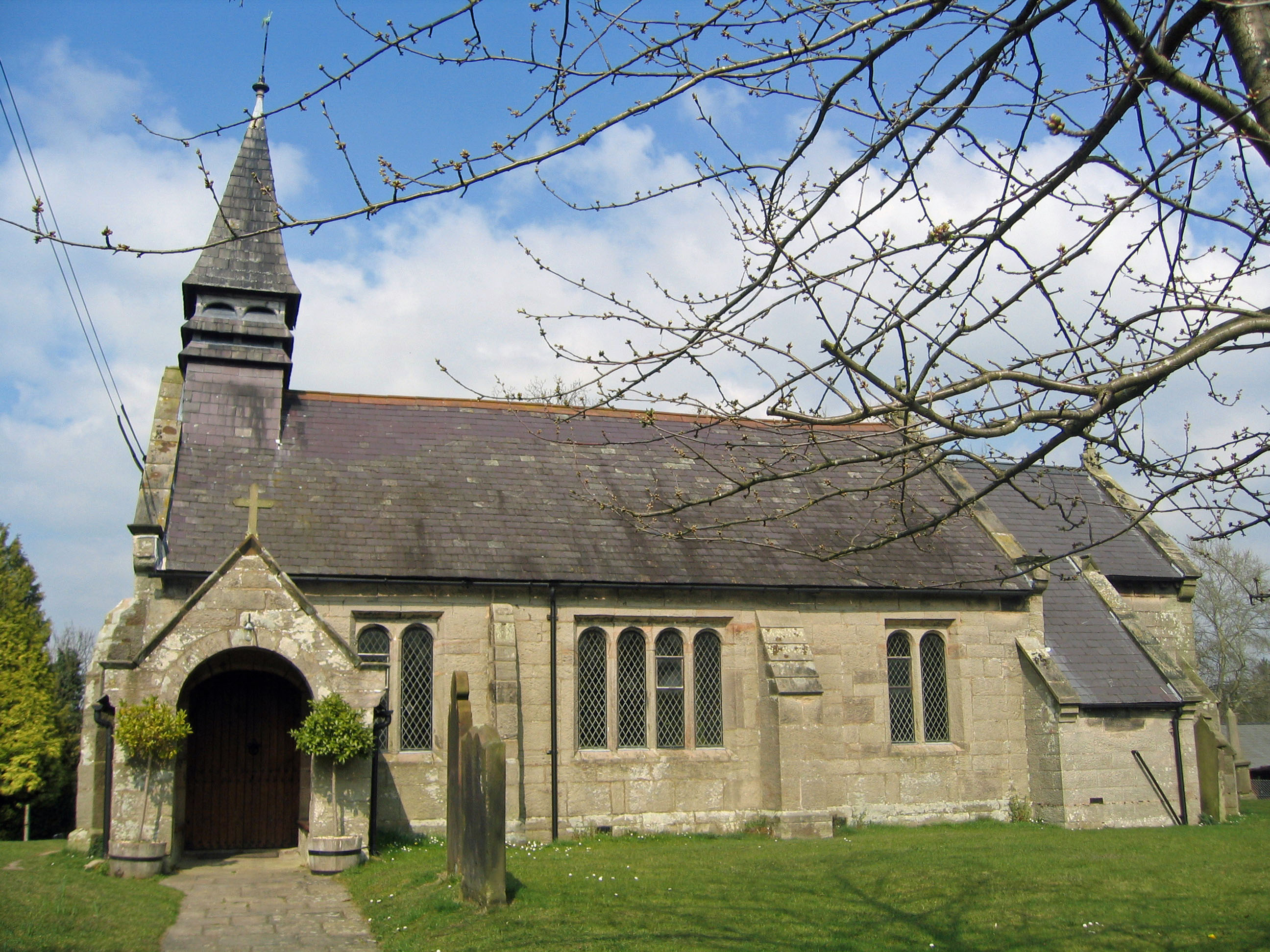
- St John's Church, Burwardsley, from the south

- Location in Cheshire
- OS grid reference: SJ 515,565
- Location: Burwardsley, Cheshire
- Country: England
- Denomination: Anglican
- Website: St John the Evangelist, Burwardsley

History
- Status: Parish church
- Dedication: St John the Evangelist

Architecture
- Functional status: Active
- Heritage designation: Grade II
- Designated: 19 June 1984
- Architect: John Douglas (restoration)
- Architectural type: Church
- Completed: c. 1878

Specifications
- Materials: Ashlar buff sandstone Welsh slate roof

Administration
- Province: York
- Diocese: Chester
- Archdeaconry: Chester
- Deanery: Malpas
- Parish: Burwardsley

Clergy
- Rector: Revd Lameck Mutete

St John's Church is in School Lane, Burwardsley, Cheshire, England. It is recorded in the National Heritage List for England as a designated Grade II listed building. It is an active Anglican parish church in the diocese of Chester, the archdeaconry of Chester and the deanery of Malpas. Its benefice is combined with those of Holy Trinity, Bickerton, St Wenefrede, Bickley, and All Saints, Harthill.

== History ==
The church originates from the 17th century. It has a buttress dated 1730, and the church was restored in 1795. In 1871 a further restoration was carried out by the Chester architect John Douglas, which included the addition of a bell turret. Another restoration, with the addition of a chancel which has been attributed to Douglas, was carried out in about 1878.

== Architecture ==
=== Exterior ===
St John's is constructed in ashlar buff sandstone with a Welsh slate roof. Its plan consists of a three-bay nave, a one-bay chancel with a side chapel, and a south porch. The bays of the nave are divided by buttresses and they have two or four-light mullioned windows with arch-headed lights. The east window has three round-headed lights, the central one being taller. The west window is simple with Y-tracery. The bell turret is at the west end and has a pyramidal roof.

=== Interior ===
The interior has simple 19th-century fittings. The organ dates from about 1840. Its maker is unknown, and it was restored in 1984 by Whiteley.

== External features ==
The churchyard contains the war graves of two soldiers of World War I.

== See also ==
- Listed buildings in Burwardsley
- List of church restorations, amendments and furniture by John Douglas
