= James Heffernan =

James Heffernan may refer to:

- James Heffernan (sculptor) (1788–1847) Irish sculptor
- James J. Heffernan (1888–1967), U.S. Representative from New York
- James Heffernan (Irish politician) (born 1979), Irish Labour Party politician
- Frank Heffernan (James Francis Heffernan, 1892–1938), Canadian ice hockey defenceman and coach
