= Listed buildings in Wirswall =

Wirswall is a former civil parish in Cheshire East, England. It contained five buildings that are recorded in the National Heritage List for England as designated listed buildings, all of which were listed at Grade II. This grade is the lowest of the three gradings given to listed buildings and is applied to "buildings of national importance and special interest". Apart from the village of Wirswall, the parish was rural. The Llangollen Canal passed through the parish, and two locks within the parish are listed. The other listed buildings are two farmhouses and a barn.

Name and location	Photograph	Date	Notes
Barn, Wirswall Hall; 52.99282°N 2.67934°W	—	16th or 17th century	The barn is timber-framed and covered in clapboard. The roof is thatched, and covered in corrugated iron. The barn was originally in a single storey, and a first floor was later inserted.
The Grange Farmhouse; 52.99107°N 2.68049°W	—	1636	The farmhouse is basically timber-framed with a brick infill, and is largely in rendered brick with a tiled roof. The house is in two storeys with a front of four bays, the gabled right bay projecting forward. The middle of the other three bays has a central doorway; this is flanked by single-storey canted bay windows, and there is a similar window in the right bay. To the right is a massive chimney stack.
Povey's Lock and spillway 52.99743°N 2.69817°W		1795	The lock and spillway are on the Llangollen Canal, for which the engineer was Thomas Telford. They are built in brick with sandstone copings. There are single upper and double lower gates, the original wooden gates having been replaced by steel gates.
Willeymoor Lock; 53.00167°N 2.69508°W		c. 1800	The lock is on the Llangollen Canal, for which the engineers were Thomas Telford and William Jessop. The lock is in brick with stone copings that have been partly replaced in concrete. There are single upper and double lower gates, both in timber. The spillway to the east is lined in brick.
Wood Farmhouse; 52.99538°N 2.67474°W		Early 19th century	The farmhouse is built in rendered brick with a slate roof, and is in Gothick style. It is in two storeys, and has a symmetrical three-bay front. The central bay projects forward and has octagonal turrets at the corners that rise to spirelets. It contains a gablet with a shield. Above the windows are Tudor hood moulds. There is a lower two-bay service wing to the left of the house.
