= North Cheshire Way =

71-mile footpath in Cheshire, England

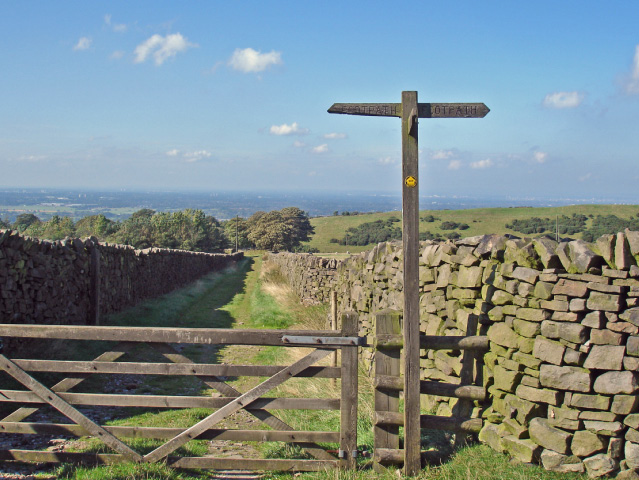
- Waymark near Pott Shrigley
- Length: 71 mi (114 km)
- Location: Cheshire, England
- Trailheads: Hooton railway station Disley railway station
- Use: Hiking
- Highest point: Lyme Park 260 m (853 ft)

The North Cheshire Way is a 71-mile (114 km) long-distance footpath in Cheshire, England. It runs approximately eastwards from Hooton railway station on the Wirral peninsula to Disley railway station on the edge of the Peak District, where it connects with the Gritstone Trail. There is a 6-mile (9.7 km) spur from Chester to Croughton.

The path was developed by the Mid-Cheshire Footpath Society and opened in September 2006. It is Cheshire's longest long-distance footpath and is waymarked with yellow disks marked "NCW".

== Route ==
The North Cheshire Way passes through or near the following places:

- Hooton
- Ledsham
- Capenhurst
- Backford
- Croughton
  - Blacon
  - Chester railway station
- Stoak
- Bridge Trafford
- Dunham on the Hill
- Alvanley
- Helsby Hill
- Frodsham Hill
- Crewood Hall
- Dutton Viaduct
- Acton Bridge
- Barnton
- Anderton Boat Lift
- Marbury Country Park
- Great Budworth
- Arley and Arley Hall
- Tabley
- Knutsford
- Mobberley
- Manchester Airport
- Quarry Bank Mill (Styal)
- Wilmslow
- Alderley Edge
- Mottram Hall
- Adlington Hall and Adlington
- Lyme Park
- Disley

Intersections with other long-distance paths include the Wirral Way at Hooton, the Sandstone Trail near Helsby, the Cheshire Ring at Barnton and near Bollington, and the Gritstone Trail at Lyme Park and Disley. The route crosses the Shropshire Union Canal near Stoak and the River Gowy at Bridge Trafford. It follows the River Weaver between Frodsham and Barnton, the Trent and Mersey Canal near Marbury Country Park, the River Bollin from Styal to Wilmslow, and the Macclesfield Canal briefly near Adlington.

== See also ==
- South Cheshire Way
- List of recreational walks in Cheshire
