= Hockenhull Platts =

Nature reserve and group of bridges in Cheshire, England

Hockenhull Platts Nature Reserve
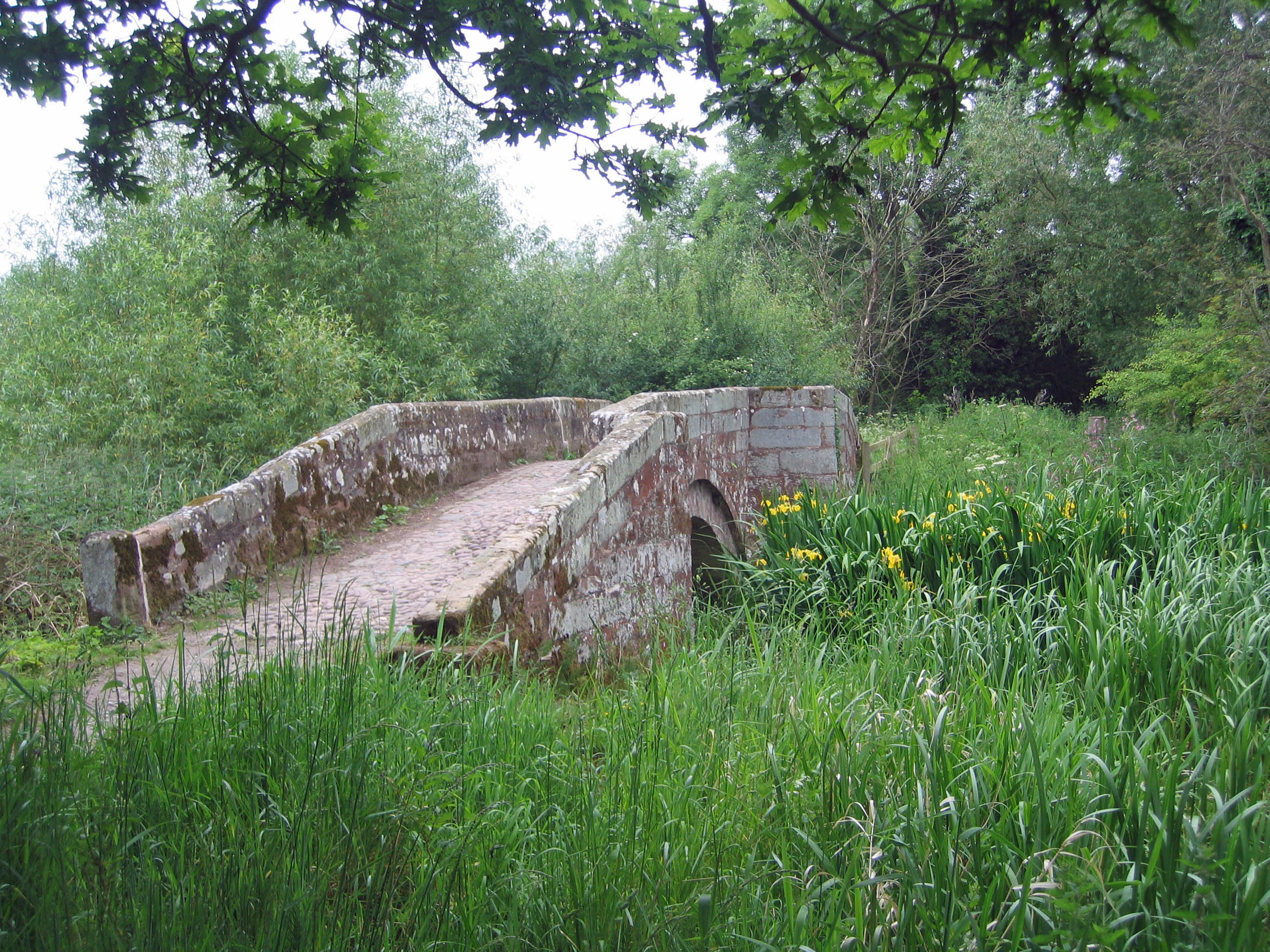
- The westernmost bridge

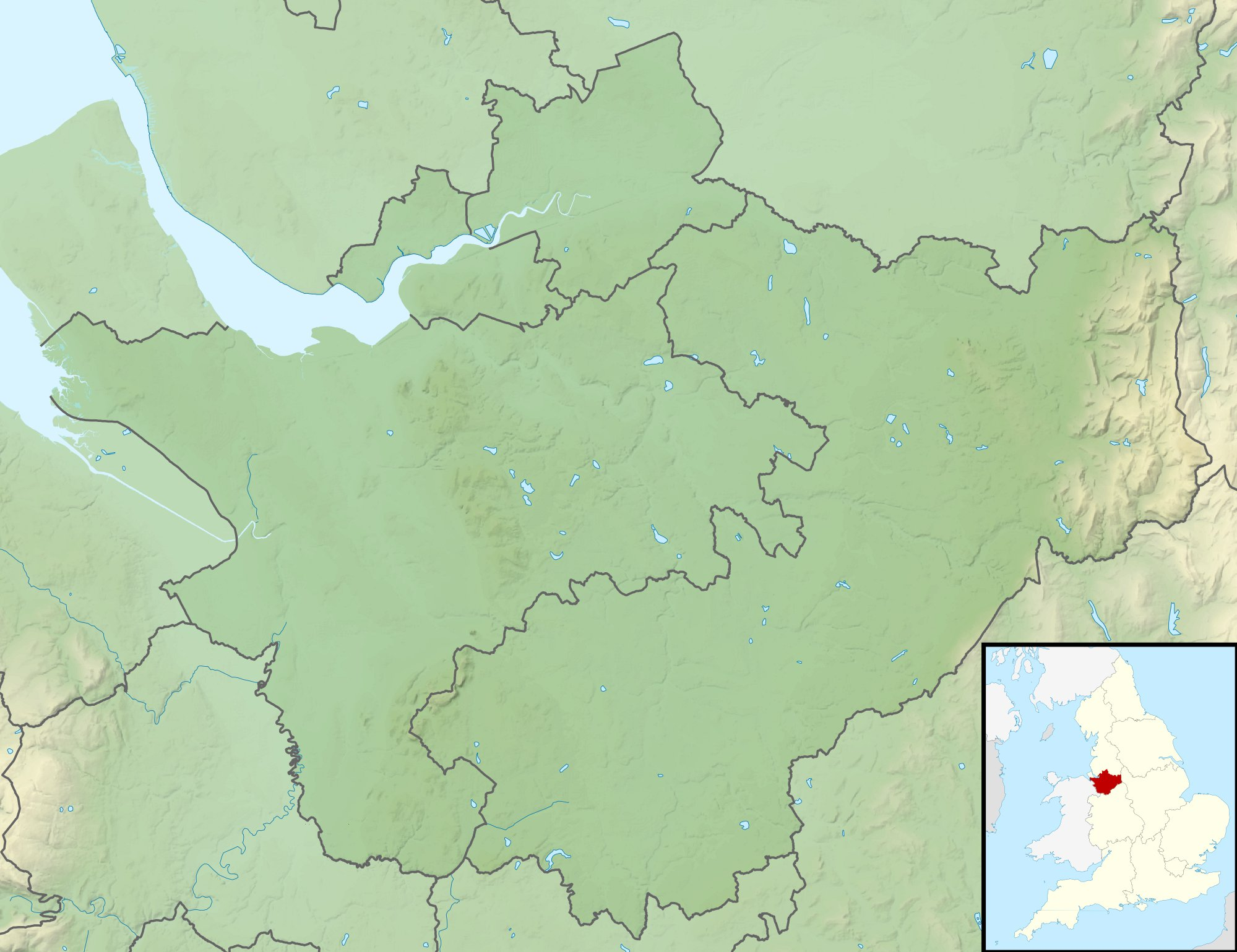
- Location within Cheshire
- Type: Nature reserve
- Location: near Tarvin, Cheshire
- OS grid: SJ476657
- Coordinates: 53.1862°N 2.7849°W
- Area: 5 hectares (12 acres)
- Elevation: 15 metres (49 ft)
- Operator: Cheshire Wildlife Trust
- Open: at all times

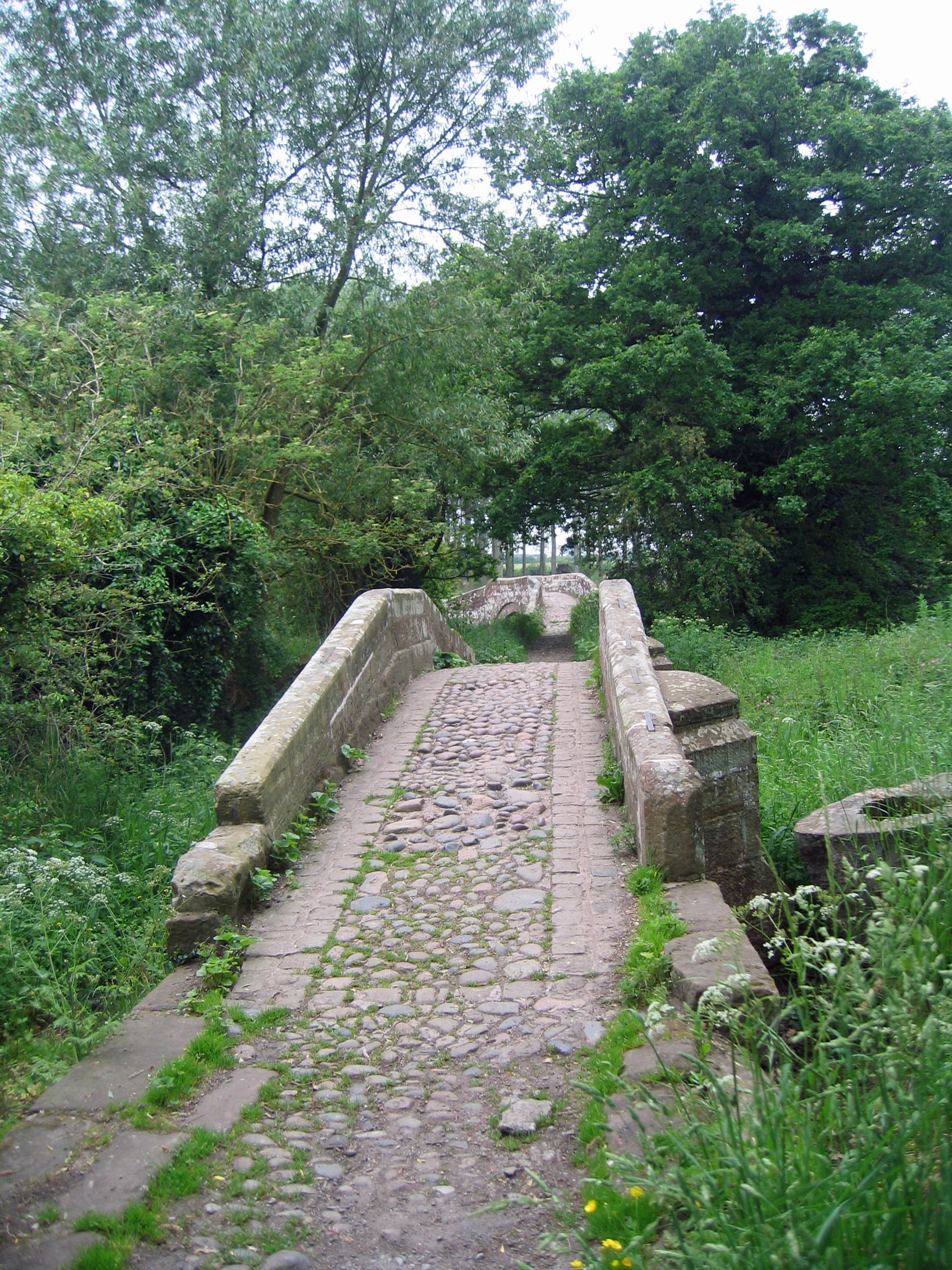
The easternmost bridge with the central bridge visible beyond

The Hockenhull Platts are three bridges southwest of the village of Tarvin, Cheshire, England. They are also known as the "Packhorse Bridges" or (erroneously) the "Roman Bridges", and are recorded in the National Heritage List for England as designated Grade II listed buildings. The bridges are situated where Platts Lane crosses the River Gowy. An area of 5 hectares (12 acres) west of the Gowy, including the westernmost bridge, forms Hockenhull Platts Nature Reserve, managed by the Cheshire Wildlife Trust.

== Etymology ==
Although the bridges are in England, they are not far from the Welsh border and it is likely that their name is derived from a combination of English and Welsh roots. Platt is an Old English word for "bridge" and is associated with "plank". "Hock" may come from the Welsh hocan which means to peddle or to sell abroad. Hen is Welsh for "old" and heol means a paved way or road. It is therefore possible that Hockenhull Platts means "the bridges on the old peddlars' way".

== History ==
Platts Lane originally formed part of the medieval road from London to Holyhead. In 1353 when Edward, the Black Prince, crossed the bridges, he ordered that 20 shillings should be spent on their repair. In the 17th century the surface of the road was disintegrating so badly that posts were set into the road to prevent the passage of carts, and it could be used only by pedestrians and horses. Goods were carried by convoys of packhorses led by a driver (or jagger) walking in front. The pioneer female traveller Celia Fiennes crossed the bridges in 1698, as did Thomas Pennant in 1780.

The present bridges probably date from the latter part of the 18th century. In 1824 Cheshire County Council proposed to divert the road from Nantwich to Chester and make it pass along Platts Lane, which would have led to the destruction of the bridges. However the land on which they stood belonged to the Marquess of Westminster, and he refused permission for the road to be diverted.

== Present day ==
Hockenhull Platts consists of three humpback bridges which are approached and connected by causeways. The bridges are constructed from tooled blocks of red sandstone. The parapets are plain and are surmounted by chamfered coping stones which are joined by iron ties. The carriageway is formed from a mixture of stone setts and cobbles.

The central bridge crosses the River Gowy. Formerly the three bridges and causeways were necessary because the whole area was too marshy to be crossed by any other means. However, in the 20th century a scheme was carried out to lower the water level of the whole of the River Gowy to prevent possible flooding of Stanlow Refinery, which is situated near the junction of the river with the Mersey. As a consequence, the marshes were drained and the footings of the central bridge were raised on a concrete foundation.

The Baker Way long-distance path crosses the three bridges.

=== Nature reserve ===
The area to the west of the Gowy, including the westernmost bridge, has been converted into a nature reserve which is managed by Cheshire Wildlife Trust in an agreement with Grosvenor (Eaton) Estates. The nature reserve covers an area of about 11 acres (4.5 ha) and access is by permit only. The reserve includes a trail (the Mill Trail), and habitats include a poplar plantation, reedbed and species-rich wet meadows. The poplar plantation is sparse and its wet nature has created an unusual stand of common reed at the ground layer. The reserve is also rich in bird life, with over 64 species recorded, including three species of summer visiting warblers, including sedge warbler. Otters have been recorded along the banks of the Gowy.

== Associated archaeological findings ==
Immediately to the south of the central bridge is an earthwork which is visible only when the sun is low. It consists of a low ditched rectangular mound and an adjacent ring ditch. It probably dates from the post-medieval period. The area is otherwise covered by irregular drainage channels.

In the area of Hockenhull Platts but at an uncertain location, some time before 1940 a pair of prehistoric translucent worked flints were found, one white and the other grey.

== See also ==
- Listed buildings in Cotton Edmunds
