= Listed buildings in Bickley, Cheshire =

Bickley is a former civil parish, now in the parish of No Man's Heath and District, in Cheshire West and Chester, England. It contains 13 buildings that are recorded in the National Heritage List for England as designated listed buildings, all of which are at Grade II. This grade is the lowest of the three gradings given to listed buildings and is applied to "buildings of national importance and special interest". Apart from the settlements of Bickley Town, Bickley Moss, and No Man's Heath, the parish is rural, and most of the listed buildings are domestic or related to farming. Many of them originated in the 17th century, and are basically timber-framed. The other structures in the list include two model cottages for the Cholmondeley estate, a pumphouse, and a church.

Name and location	Photograph	Date	Notes
Bickley Town Cottages; 53.0327°N 2.7010°W	—	Early 17th century	Originally a farmhouse, later divided into two cottages. The building is basically timber-framed with brick nogging, much of which has been replaced by brick painted to resemble timber framing. It is in two storeys, and has a tiled roof. On the front each cottage has a porch with a gabled roof. Above this is single-storey bay window with a hipped slate roof, over which is a casement window in a gabled half-dormer with bargeboards and a finial. Behind each cottage is a 19th-century store shed that is included in the listing.
Cobweb Cottage; 53.0262°N 2.7242°W	—	Mid 17th century	The cottage is timber-framed with brick nogging, which has been partly replaced in painted brick. It is roofed in cement slates. The cottage is in 1 1/2 storeys, and has casement windows.
Cottage near Cobweb Cottage; 53.0262°N 2.7244°W	—	Mid 17th century (probable)	The cottage is timber-framed, which has been partly replaced in painted brick, with a roof of cement slates. It is in one storey, with an attic containing a flat-roofed dormer. The windows are casements. Against the right gable is a small 19th-century single-storey brick lean-to.
The Heritage; 53.0343°N 2.6887°W	—	Mid 17th century (probable)	Originally two cottages, it is now a single house. It is in two storeys, the lower part being timber-framed with brick nogging, and the upper part in painted brick. The roof is slated. The windows in the lower storey are casements; there are also casements in the upper storey, contained in gabled dormers.
Bickley Hall Farmhouse; 53.0267°N 2.7082°W	—	17th century	The farmhouse incorporates part of a farm building. Alterations and additions have been made during each succeeding century. The farmhouse itself is in two wings, forming an L-shaped plan. It has retained some timber framing, but is mainly in brick. The roofs are slated. The farm building has sandstone quoins and a mullioned window. The windows in the house are casements, sashes, and a bay window.
Sycamore Cottage; 53.0348°N 2.6858°W	—	17th century	The original part of the cottage is timber-framed with brick nogging. It has been partly rebuilt in brick, and has a thatched roof; this part is in a single storey with an attic bedroom. To the right is a single-storey brick wing with a tiled roof. The windows are casements. Inside are back-to-back inglenooks with oak bressumers.
Bickley Moss Cottage; 53.0374°N 2.6807°W	—	1673	Originally two cottages, they have since been converted into a single unit with an L-shaped plan. It is timber-framed with brick nogging and has a thatched roof. The building is in one storey with attic bedrooms. The windows on the ground floor are casements; above are dormers that are either gabled or eyebrows.
Faraway Meadow; 53.0263°N 2.7251°W	—	Late 17th century	The cottage is timber-framed with brick nogging, and a brick bay added to the left side in the 19th century. It is roofed in cement slates. The cottage is in two storeys, and three bays, with half-dormers in the upper floor. The windows are casements. Inside is an inglenook with an oak bressumer.
Top House Farmhouse; 53.0267°N 2.7241°W	—	c. 1700	A brick house, formerly a farmhouse, with a slate roof in two storeys. The windows are casements. Inside the house is an inglenook.
Oaktree Cottage; 53.0380°N 2.6793°W	—	Mid 19th century	A model cottage for the Cholmondeley estate, constructed in brick with a slate roof. It has a symmetrical front with a central two-storey bay, and a single-storey wing on each side. In the central bay is a single-storey canted bay window. The other windows are casements. In the central ridge is a chimney with three separated diagonal flues, and on the left wing is a chimney with one flue.
Rockbarton; 53.0387°N 2.6786°W	—	Mid 19th century	A model cottage for the Cholmondeley estate, constructed in brick with a slate roof. It consists of a central two-storey bay, and a single-storey wing on each side. In the central bay is a single-storey canted bay window. In the central ridge is a chimney with three separated diagonal flues, and on the left wing is a chimney with one flue.
Pumphouse; 53.02712°N 2.72483°W	—	Late 19th century	The cast iron pump is surrounded by a shelter consisting of timber framing on sandstone sidewalls. On the front is an oak panel with a religious inscription. The pumphouse has a tiled roof. Also inside the shelter is a round-fronted sandstone bucket-stand.
St Wenefrede's Church; 53.0364°N 2.6922°W		1892	The church was designed by Douglas and Fordham of Chester for the 4th Marquess of Cholmondeley. It is constructed in sandstone with a roof of green slates and terracotta roof tiles. The church consists of a nave with a south porch, a narrow north aisle, a chancel, and two north vestries. At the west end is a tower with a splay-footed octagonal spire.
