= William Bennet (bishop) =

Bishop of Cloyne, Ireland, and an antiquary

William Bennet (4 March 1746 – 16 July 1820) (spelled William Bennett on his memorial in Cloyne Cathedral) was Bishop of Cloyne, Ireland, and an antiquary.

He was born in the Tower of London and educated at Harrow School and Emmanuel College, Cambridge, where he was a senior tutor for many years. One of his pupils was John Fane, who appointed Bennet as his chaplain upon taking up the post of Lord Lieutenant of Ireland in 1790. Bennet then became Bishop of Cork and Ross until 1794 when he became Bishop of Cloyne.

He died in Montagu Square, London, and "His exertions while preaching a charity sermon at St Michael, Cornhill, exacerbated by a recent attack of gout, are supposed to have hastened his death." He was buried in Plumstead, at that time in Kent.

He was a scholar and antiquary, elected Fellow of the Society of Antiquaries in 1790. He was particularly interested in tracing the Roman roads of Britain, and Bishop Bennet Way is a horse-riding, walking and cycling route in Cheshire, England, named in honour of his surveys of the Roman roads of the area.

His memorial in Cloyne Cathedral shows a slave holding a Bible and was created by James Heffernan.
