= Bradeley Green =

Village in Cheshire, England

Coordinates: 52.999°N 2.691°W

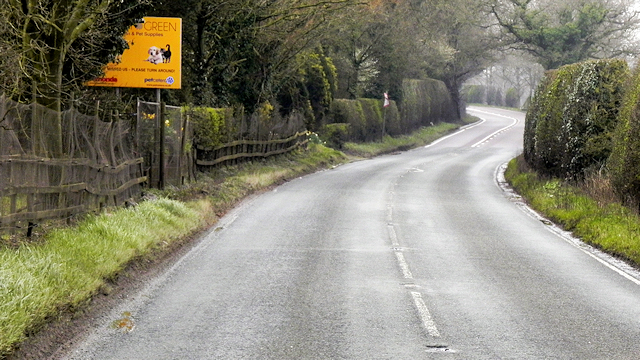
- A49 road at Bradeley Green

- Location within Cheshire
- OS grid reference: SJ536448
- Civil parish: Wirswall
- Unitary authority: Cheshire East
- Ceremonial county: Cheshire
- Region: North West
- Country: England
- Sovereign state: United Kingdom
- Post town: WHITCHURCH
- Postcode district: SY13
- Dialling code: 01948
- Police: Cheshire
- Fire: Cheshire
- Ambulance: North West
- UK Parliament: Chester South and Eddisbury

Bradeley Green is a village in Cheshire East, England. It is located on the A49 road north of Whitchurch and on the county border with Shropshire.
