= Vicars Cross =

Suburb of Chester, Cheshire, England

Coordinates: 53.194°N 2.844°W

- Location within Cheshire
- Population: 8,984 (2011 Census)
- OS grid reference: SJ439668
- Unitary authority: Cheshire West and Chester
- Ceremonial county: Cheshire
- Region: North West
- Country: England
- Sovereign state: United Kingdom
- Post town: CHESTER
- Postcode district: CH3
- Dialling code: 01244
- Police: Cheshire
- Fire: Cheshire
- Ambulance: North West
- UK Parliament: City of Chester

Vicars Cross (originally "Vicar's Cross") is a large residential suburb constituting the civil parish of Great Boughton, situated on the eastern side of Chester. It is located in the unitary authority of Cheshire West and Chester and the ceremonial county of Cheshire, England, United Kingdom. At the 2011 Census the area contained a population of about 8,984 (2011 census).

== History ==
The main road crossing the suburb, today known as Vicars Cross Road (A51), once made up part of the Roman roads of Watling Street and Via Devana. For most of Chester's history, the area which now makes up Vicars Cross consisted of farmland situated just over a mile away from the city centre (with Brook House and Crow Farm being noteworthy). During the industrial revolution, the westernmost part of the area became the site of a brick factory. It first became a residential settlement of the city of Chester during the mid 20th century, as more homes were needed to support the growing population of the United Kingdom.

== Community ==
Vicars Cross is a multi-generational community and includes Oldfield Primary School, Vicars Cross Library (both of which are located on Green Lane), The United Reformed Church, Vicars Cross Community Centre and the Cestrian Scout Headquarters (both of which are located within Thackeray Park and Field) and a local pub called The Centurion. Recreational open spaces include Thackeray Park and Field (which consists of a large playing field, a playground and houses the Cestrian Scout Headquarters), Queens Road Park (including Josh's Jumps Bike Track, a playground and football court), Melrose Park (includes a playground) and Dulverton Avenue Park.

There are 3 commercial areas located at Green Lane, Queens Road and Tarvin Road (A51). These areas offer facilities such as convenience stores, restaurants and more. Vicars Cross also has close links to other major road systems such as the M53 motorway.

There are also many community groups including the Women's Guild and Women's Institute, a parent and toddler group, The Royal Society, Cestrian Scouts, Cestrian Rangers, Vicars Cross Residents (Keyboard Warriors), Vicars Cross Dynamos (Football Club) and Chester Rugby Union Football Club, part of which is located in Piper's Ash and Guilden Sutton.

== Governance ==
Great Boughton Parish Council comprises the North and South Wards and serves the communities of Vicars Cross; as well as Boughton Village, Boughton Heath and Great Boughton as a whole. There are a total of eight parish councillors which make up the North Ward, six of whom are Conservatives and two are Liberal Democrats. The South Ward of the parish consists of seven councillors serving the community of Boughton Heath; six of whom are Conservatives. Great Boughton Parish Council usually meet on the third Monday of every month.
