= James Heffernan (sculptor) =

Irish-born sculptor

James Heffernan (1788 – 21 October 1847) was an 18th/19th century Irish-born sculptor, later based in London.

== Life ==
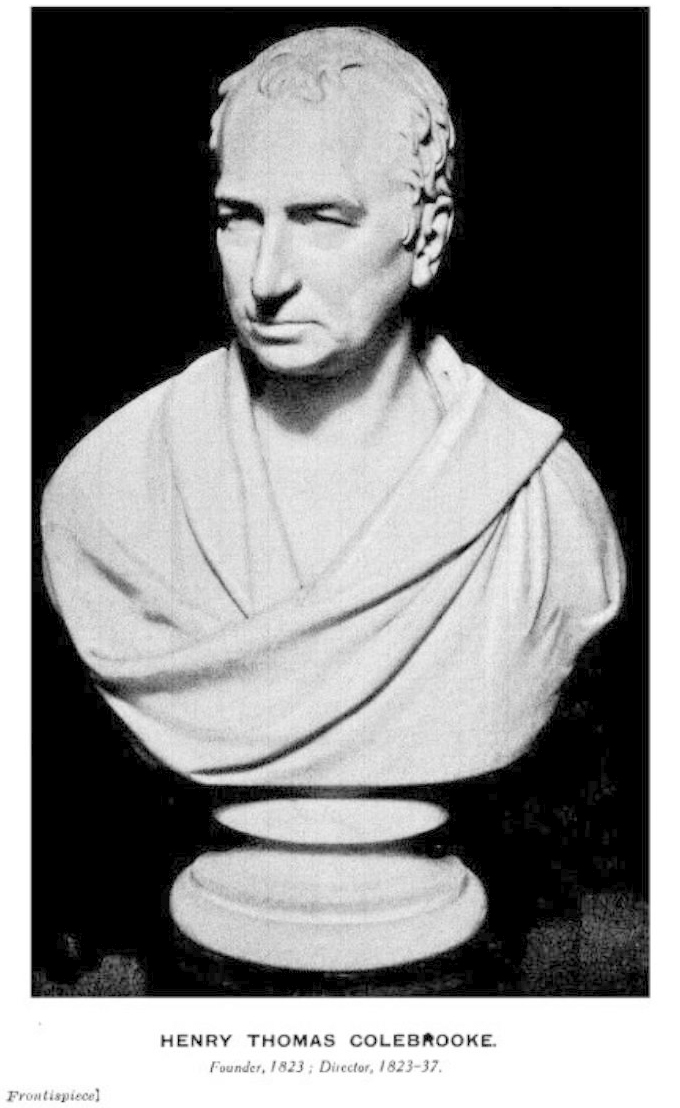
Bust of Henry Colebrooke by Heffernan whilst in the employ of Chantrey

He was born in Derry in 1788, the son of a marble-cutter and sculptor in the employ of the Frederick Hervey, 4th Earl of Bristol who was Bishop of Derry at that time. When Heffernan's father died in 1799, the Bishop found him a place as an apprentice with an architect, Michael Shanahan of Cork, who had been working on the cathedral, and Heffernan returned to Cork with him. Shanahan had a marble yard in Cork and Heffernan was put to work there making fireplaces and gravestones.

In 1810 he left Ireland and sailed to England where he went to London. There he attended the Royal Academy Schools and trained in fine sculpture under Charles Rossi, then under Francis Chantrey. He exhibited at the Royal Academy from 1816 to 1830 and won the Royal Academy's silver medal for Sculpture in both 1815 and 1817 and went on a study tour to Rome before returning to work for Chantrey (with Chantrey apparently taking credit for much of his work). Only on Chantrey's death in 1841 did Heffernan start to receive full credit for his work. According to some sources, almost all the works attributed to Chantrey in Carrera marble are actually by Heffernan; one observer said: "Heffernan has cut in marble almost every one of Chantrey's busts literally from the first to the last".

Heffernan returned to Cork in 1843, but this proved to be a poor choice and he died there, of dysentery, on 21 October 1847 as part of the general decline in Ireland in that year.

== Works by Heffernan whilst in the studio of Chantrey (usually solely credited to Chantrey) ==
The sheer volume of work out of Chantrey's workshops make it impossible for all to be from his own hands. Contemporary evidence suggests that Heffernan took most of the work on marble busts from 1820 to 1841. Chantrey would retain "special projects" in which he would take special pride, such as royalty. Under this logic, works attributable to Heffernan would be:

- Dr John Hunter (1820)
- Sir Walter Scott (1820) at Abbotsford House
- Henry Colebrooke (1820) at the India Office
- Viscount Castlereagh (1821) at National Portrait Gallery, London
- George Canning (1821) at National Portrait Gallery, London
- William Wordsworth (1821) commissioned by Sir George Beaumont
- Charles Hutton (1822) at Newcastle Literary and Philosophical Society
- Lord Castlereagh (1822) at Windsor Castle
- Memorial to Dr Matthew Baillie (1823) in Westminster Abbey
- Granville Sharp (1824) at Guildhall, London (destroyed in Blitz)
- Rev Cyril Jackson (1824) at Christ Church, Oxford
- Edward Daniel Clarke (1824) at Fitzwilliam Museum
- Sir Henry Halford (1825) at Royal College of Physicians
- George Canning (1826) in Chatsworth House
- Henry Cline (1827) in the Royal College of Surgeons
- Dean John Ireland (1829) at Bodleian Library Oxford
- Lewis Bagot (1829) at Christ Church, Oxford
- Sir Thomas William Coke (1829) at Holkham
- James Northcote (1831) at Pynes House, Norfolk
- Baron David Hume (1833) in Court of Session in Edinburgh
- John Abernethy (1833) in Royal College of Surgeons
- Mary Somerville (1837) at Royal Society of London
- Sir Jeffrey Wyatville (1837) at Windsor Castle
- Robert Southey (1837) commissioned by John Murray
- Memorial to William Hazeldine (1840) working with John Carline at St Chad's Church, Shrewsbury
- Sir Stamford Raffles (dnk) at Raffles Institution in Singapore
- Francis Cunningham (dnk) in Scottish National Portrait Gallery

== Works outside the scope of Chantrey ==
- Monument to Dr McCarthy in South Cork Parish Church (1808)
- Bust of J Stark (1818)
- Musidora (1822)
- ino and Bacchus (1822)
- Memorial to William Bennet, Bishop of Cloyne (1823) in Cloyne Cathedral
- Miss E W Hill (1825)
- H P Briggs (1828)
- James Morrah (1832)
- Girl Caressing a Child (1832)
- Memorial to William Forrester in All Saints Church in Leicester (1832)
- Bust of James Watt (1834) now in the Royal Society of London
- Medallion of Sir Francis Chantrey (1842) in National Portrait Gallery of Scotland, Edinburgh
- Memorial to Francis Chantrey at his grave in Norton Parish Church near Sheffield (1842)
