= Longster Trail =

Footpath in Cheshire, England

- Length: 9.1 mi (14.6 km)
- Location: Cheshire, England
- Trailheads: Helsby; Piper's Ash
- Use: Hiking
- Highest point: Helsby Hill (146m)
- Season: All year

The Longster Trail is a waymarked footpath in Cheshire, England. It runs for 9.1 miles (14.6 km) from the summit of Helsby Hill, Helsby, to the village of Piper's Ash, Chester, passing through Alvanley, Manley, Barrow, and Guilden Sutton. The route is shown on Ordnance Survey Explorer Maps 266 and 267.

== History ==
The Longster Trail was devised in the 1970s but the path was first opened and properly waymarked during the 1980s. It was named after Frank Longster, a local man who served as chairman of the Mid-Cheshire Footpath Society during the 1970s until his death in 1974. The path is waymarked with two waymarks, both the older yellow arrow and red dot markers and the newer yellow arrow which encloses the words Longster Trail.

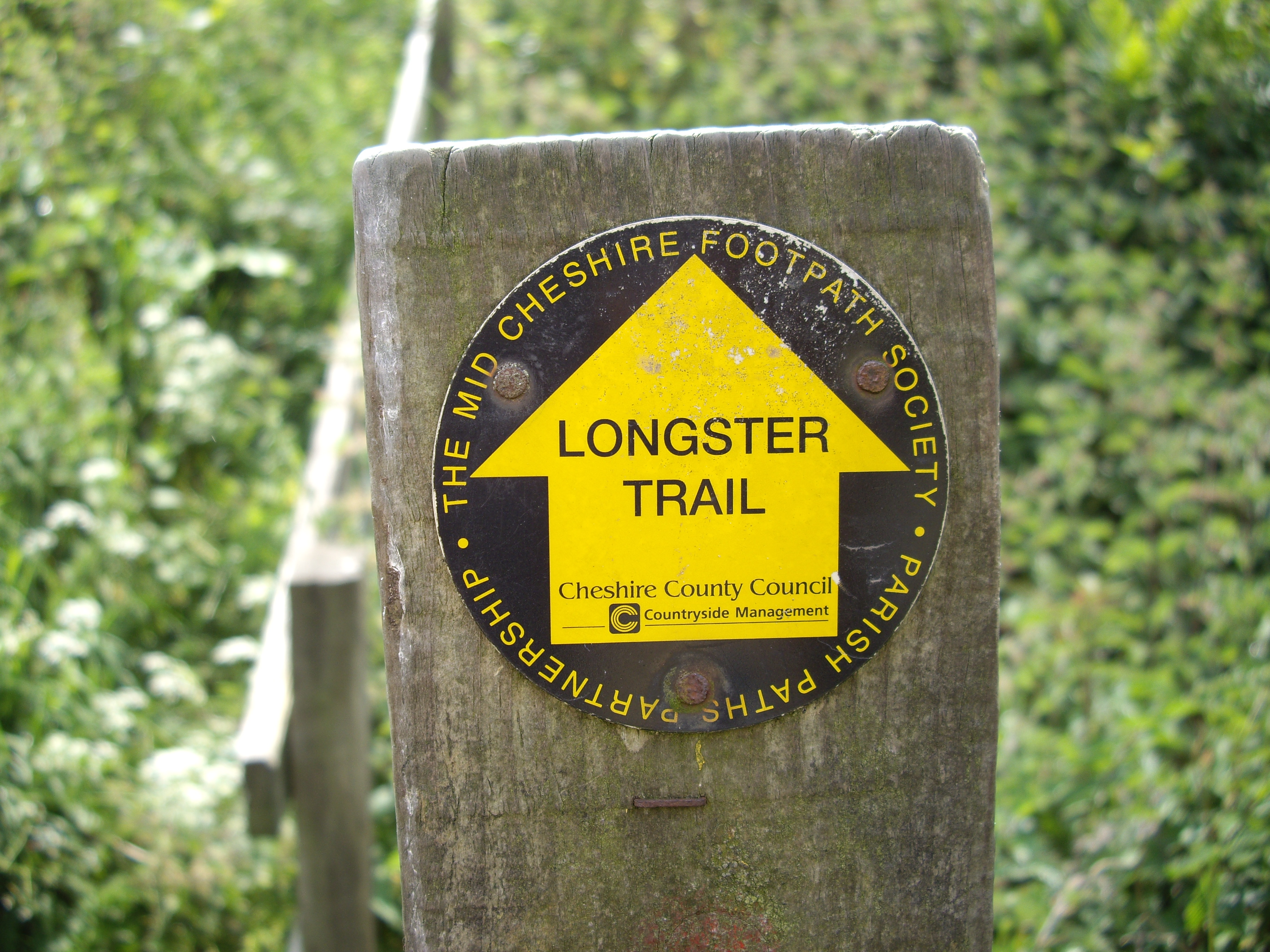
A new style Longster Trail Waymarker

== Sights ==
Many of the best sights along the Longster Trail are those seen from the summit of Helsby Hill. These include the cathedrals in Liverpool, Beeston Castle and the mountains of North Wales. Helsby Hill itself is viewable from most of the Longster Trail. The path also passes two public houses along its length, namely The White Horse in Great Barrow, and the Bird in Hand in Guilden Sutton. The end of the path is also very close to The Piper, a pub on the side of the A41 road, Chester.

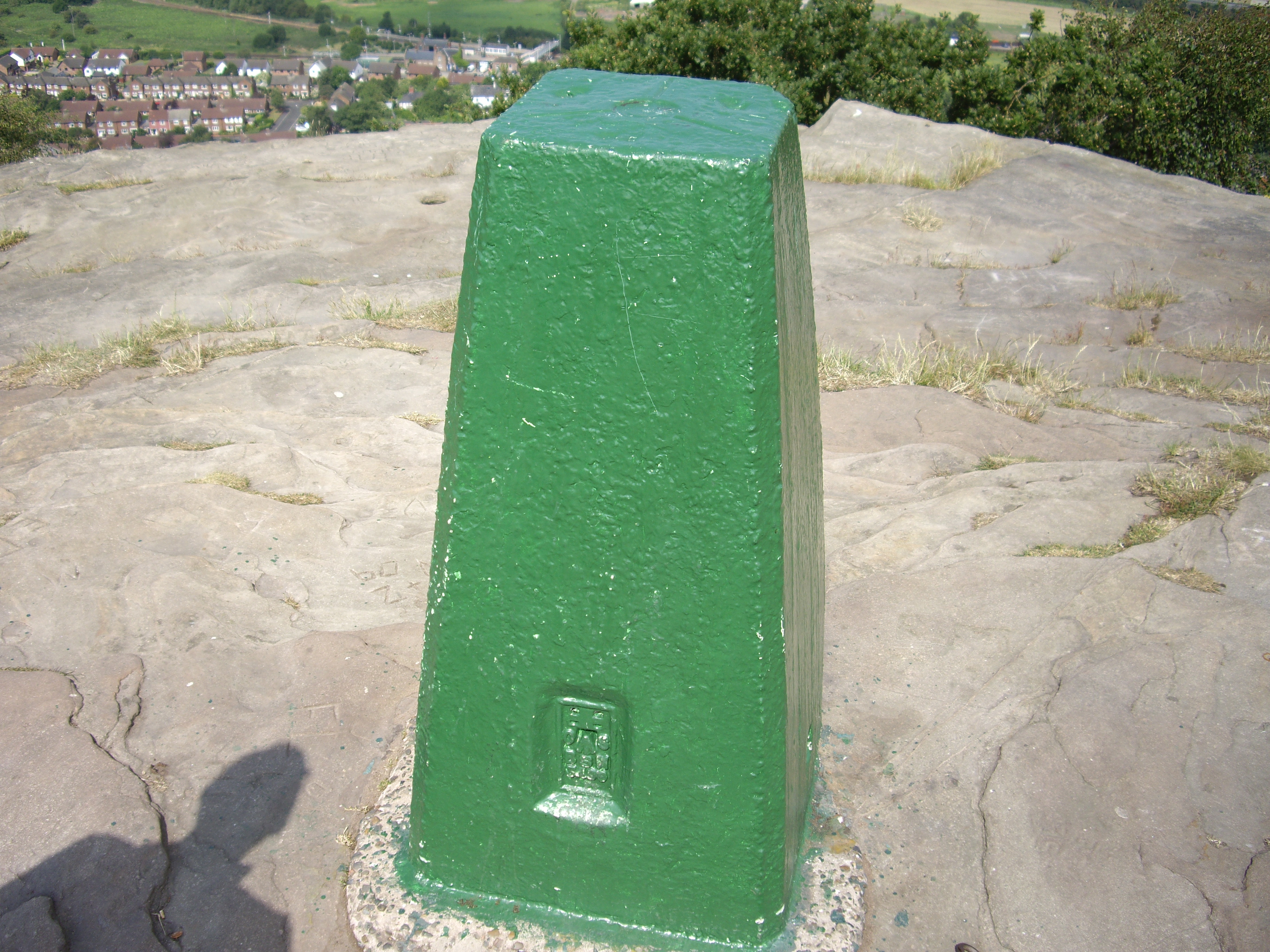
The summit marker and start of the Longster Trail, Helsby Hill

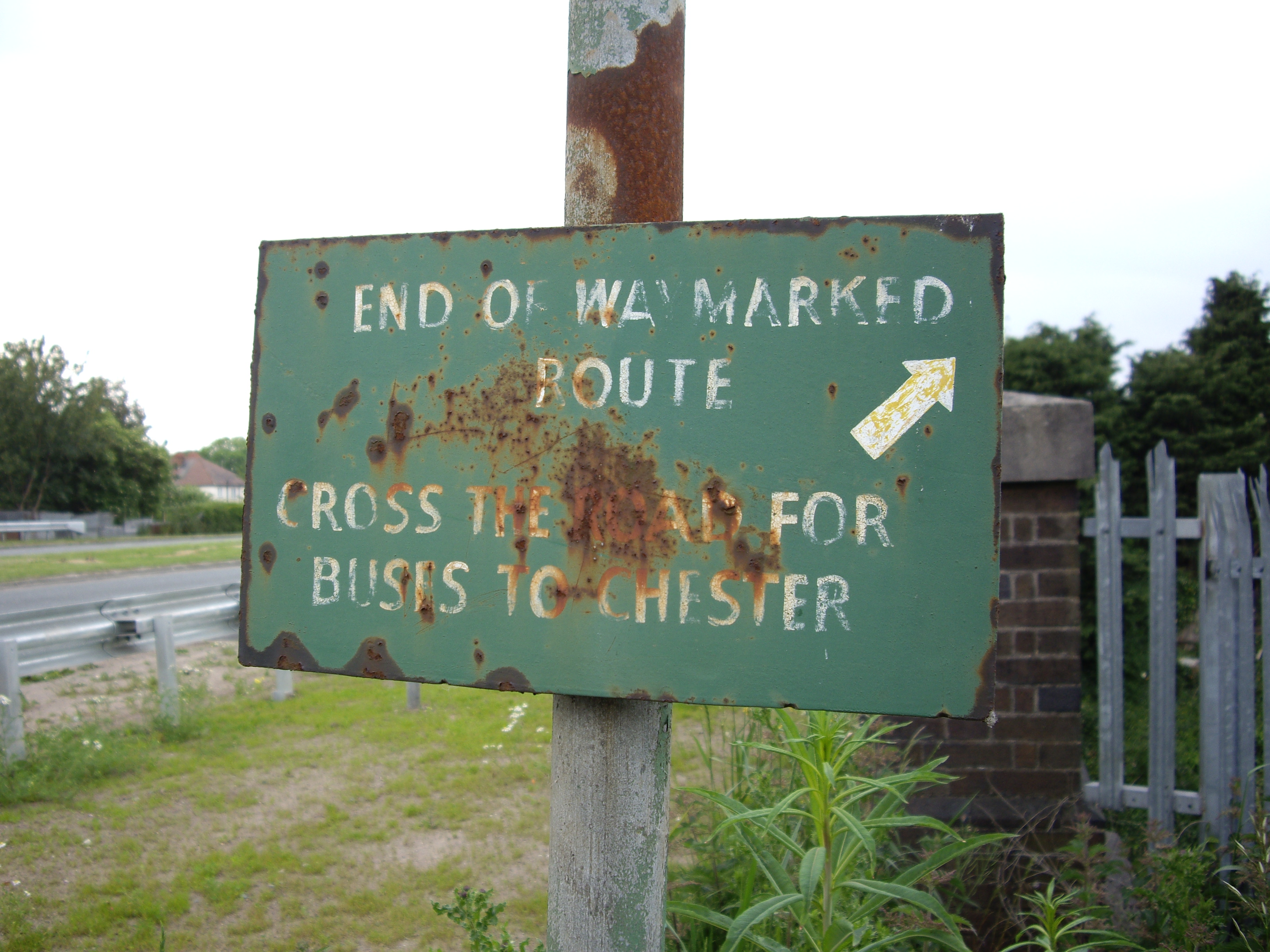
The end point of the trail on the edge of the A41 road, Pipers Ash, Chester

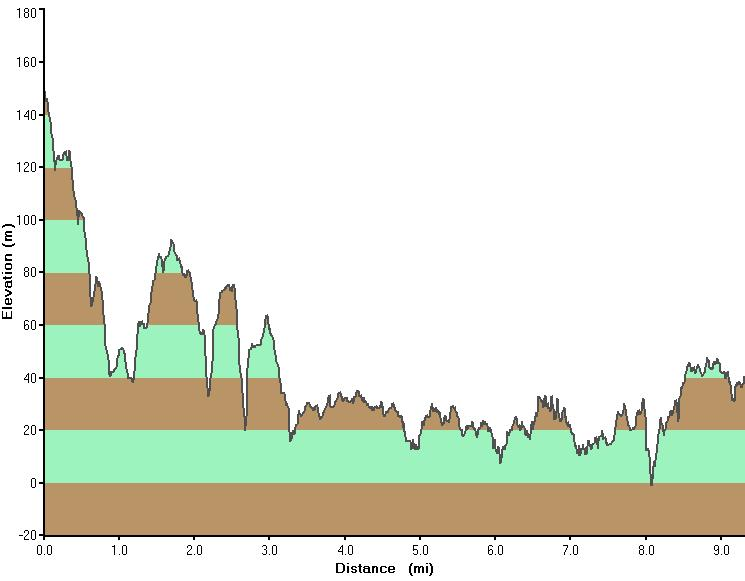
The altitude profile of the Longster Trail showing the maximum height of the path at Helsby Hill

== See also ==
- List of recreational walks in Cheshire
