= Bishop Bennet Way =

Long-distance bridleway in Cheshire, England

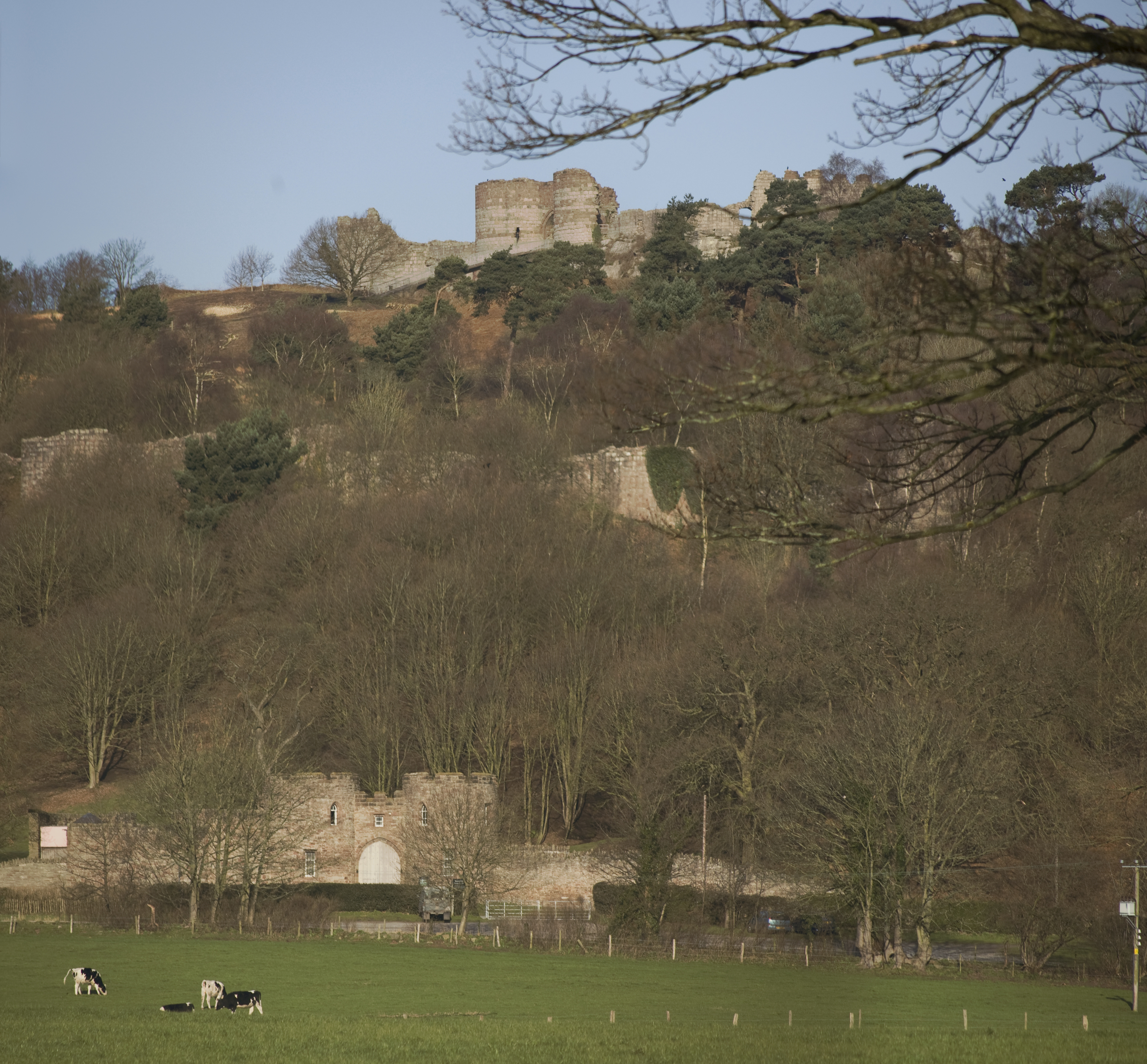
- Beeston Castle near start of the route
- Length: 34 mi (55 km)
- Location: Cheshire, England
- Trailheads: Beeston Castle; 53.1277°N 2.6913°W; Wirswall; 52.9924°N 2.6787°W
- Use: Horse riding, Hiking, Cycling

The Bishop Bennet Way is a bridleway in south west Cheshire, England. It is named after William Bennet (1745–1820), Bishop of Cork and Ross (1790–1794) and subsequently Bishop of Cloyne (1794–1820), who carried out detailed surveys of Roman roads including those between Deva (Chester) and Mediolanum (Whitchurch).

The way starts near Beeston Castle and finishes near Wirswall on the Cheshire–Shropshire border. There are hopes to extend it to Shrewsbury.

The way follows bridle ways, byways and minor roads; half of it is along tarmac roads. Walkers can bypass the longer road sections on footpaths. Cyclists are advised that some parts of the route are difficult for cycling.

The way passes through, or near, Milton Green, Coddington, Shocklach and Grindley Brook.
