= Piper's Ash =

Coordinates: 53.196737°N 2.853322°W

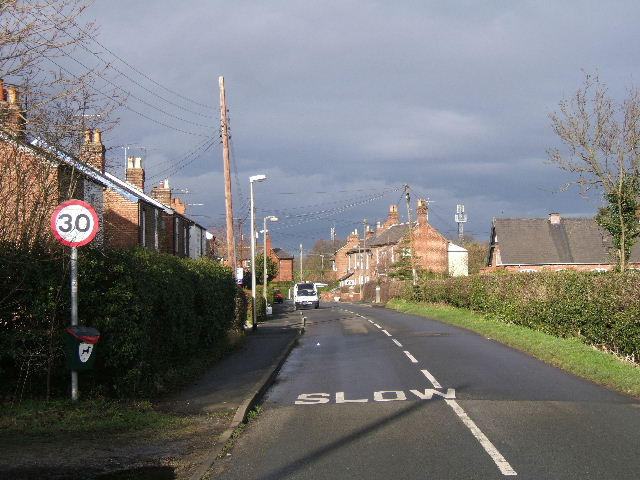
- Hare Lane through Piper's Ash

- Location within Cheshire
- OS grid reference: SJ429670
- Unitary authority: Cheshire West and Chester
- Ceremonial county: Cheshire
- Region: North West
- Country: England
- Sovereign state: United Kingdom
- Post town: Chester
- Dialling code: 01244
- Police: Cheshire
- Fire: Cheshire
- Ambulance: North West

Piper's Ash is a small hamlet between the areas of Vicars Cross, Christleton, and Guilden Sutton, situated in west Cheshire. Piper's Ash is classed as semi-rural because it is situated approximately 200 yards from the A51 on one side and countryside on the other. Village amenities include (or included) a corner shop, a chapel, (both now converted into houses) and a small village green with a phone and postbox.

The Longster Trail waymarked and maintained by the Mid-Cheshire Footpath Society is a 15 km (9.3 mi) route from Helsby to Piper's Ash.
