= Bickley, Cheshire =

Village in Cheshire, England

Coordinates: 53.0324°N 02.7006°W

Bickley
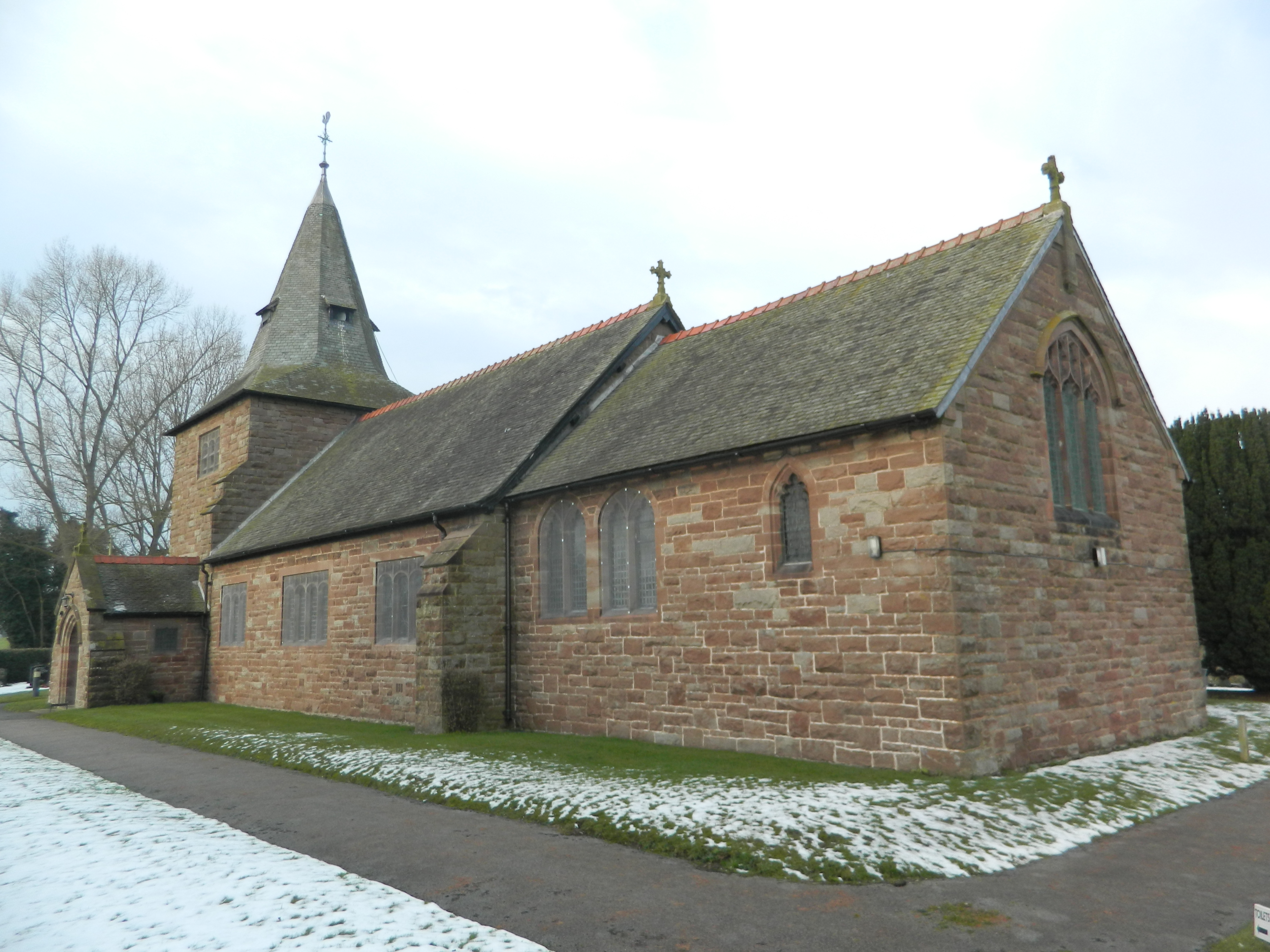
- St. Wenefrede's Church, Bickley

- Location within Cheshire
- Population: 481 (2011 Census)
- OS grid reference: SJ5348
- Civil parish: No Man's Heath and District
- Unitary authority: Cheshire West and Chester
- Ceremonial county: Cheshire
- Region: North West
- Country: England
- Sovereign state: United Kingdom
- Post town: MALPAS
- Postcode district: SY14
- Dialling code: 01948
- Police: Cheshire
- Fire: Cheshire
- Ambulance: North West
- UK Parliament: Chester South and Eddisbury

Bickley is a village in the parish of No Man's Heath and District in Cheshire West and Chester and Cheshire, England. According to the 2001 Census it had a population of 498, that reduced to 481 at the 2011 census. The parish included the villages of Bickley Town and Bickley Moss. Bickley was a township in the parish of Malpas. In 1866 Bickley became a civil parish and on 1 April 2015 it was abolished to form "No Mans Heath and District".

The name is Anglo-Saxon in origin, and relates to bees.

The parish church is St Wenefrede's, a grade-II-listed sandstone building designed by John Douglas and Daniel Porter Fordham.

== See also ==
- Listed buildings in Bickley, Cheshire
