= Wirswall =

Hamlet in Cheshire, England

Coordinates: 52.99243°N 2.67868°W

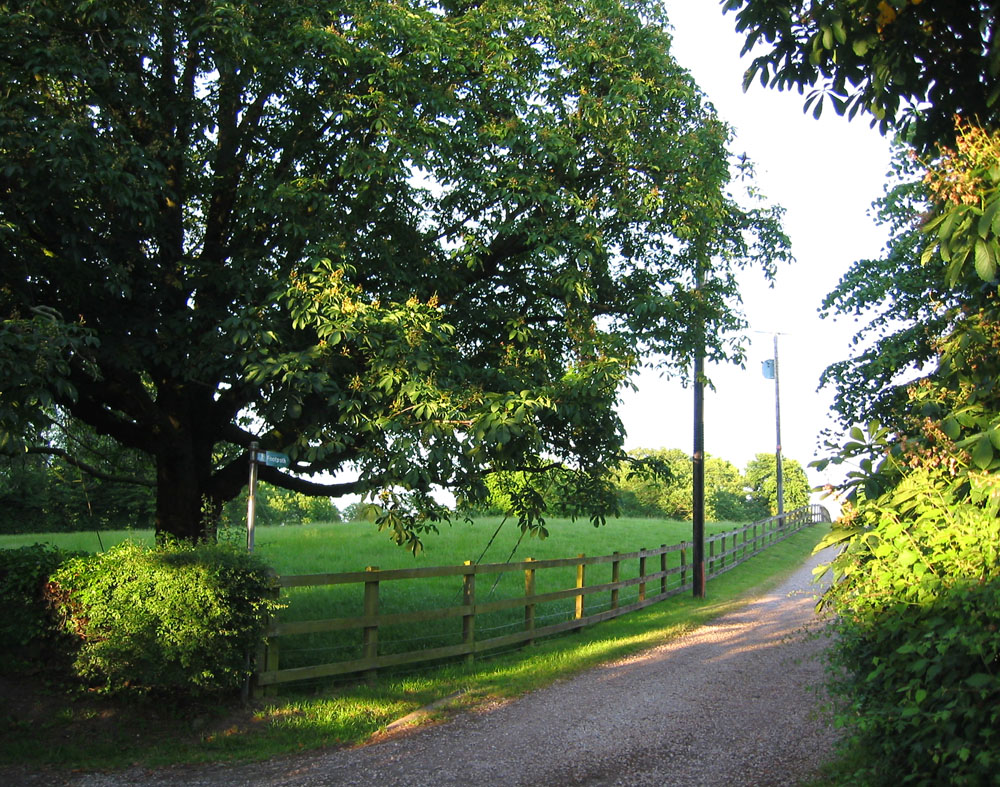
- South Cheshire Way at Wirswall

- Location within Cheshire
- OS grid reference: SJ544441
- Civil parish: Marbury and District
- Unitary authority: Cheshire East
- Ceremonial county: Cheshire
- Region: North West
- Country: England
- Sovereign state: United Kingdom
- Post town: WHITCHURCH
- Postcode district: SY13
- Dialling code: 01948
- Police: Cheshire
- Fire: Cheshire
- Ambulance: North West
- UK Parliament: Chester South and Eddisbury

Wirswall is a hamlet in the parish of Marbury and District, in Cheshire East, Cheshire, England. Wirswall was formerly a civil parish until 2023. The nearest town is Whitchurch, which lies 1.5 miles (2.4 km) to the south, over the county boundary in Shropshire.

== History ==
A large perforated stone axe was found in the village, suggesting occupation during the Neolithic Period.

The village appears in the Domesday Book as Wiresuelle, an outlying estate of Marbury. Like much of the land in the Nantwich hundred it was then held by William Malbank, having been earlier held by Earl Harold. The Domesday Book describes it as being 'waste', suggesting that any settlement might have been destroyed during the suppression of the rebellion of 1069–70. In 1288, it formed part of the barony of Wich Malbank. In 1656, Wirswall (then spelled Wyrsal) was held by the Hinton family.

== Geography and transport ==
The village is surrounded by low hills, which form the highest land in the immediate area. A trig point at 156 m is located to the south east of the village at SJ549438. Nearby villages include Marbury and Wrenbury.

The South Cheshire Way (long-distance footpath) runs through the village, and Bishop Bennet Way (bridleway) terminates there. The Llangollen branch of the Shropshire Union Canal runs ¾ miles to its east.

== Landmarks ==
Wicksted Hall is a brick and timbered building with a stone portal, dating from the late 19th century. Wirswall Hall has a grade-II-listed timber-framed barn dating from the 16th or 17th century. There are also two grade-II-listed farmhouses. Grange Farm has a two-storey, four-bay farmhouse with a projecting gabled bay. The building is dated 1636 and has a timber frame with brick infill. Wood Farm has a two-storey Gothic-style farmhouse in rendered brick which dates from the early 19th century. The slightly projecting central bay of the main building bears a shield and is flanked with two octagonal turrets capped with pinnacles.

== Governance ==
There are two tiers of local government covering Wirswall, at parish and unitary authority level: Marbury and District Parish Council and Cheshire East Council. The parish council meets at the village hall in Marbury.

=== Administrative history ===
Wirswall was historically a township in the ancient parish of Whitchurch. The rest of the parish was in Shropshire, but the Wirswall township formed part of the Nantwich hundred of Cheshire. The township had an area of 973 acres (3.94 km^{2}).

From the 17th century onwards, parishes were gradually given various civil functions under the poor laws, in addition to their original ecclesiastical functions. In some cases, the civil functions were exercised by subdivisions of the parish rather than the parish as a whole. In the case of Whitchurch, the parts of the parish in each county administered the poor laws separately. In 1866, the legal definition of 'parish' was changed to be the areas used for administering the poor laws, and so Wirswall became a separate civil parish.

The civil parish also included the settlements of Bradeley Green, Wicksted and part of Willey Moor. The population of the township or civil parish was 103 in 1801, 83 in 1851, 138 in 1901, and 169 in 1951. At the 2001 census (the last to give a population figure for Wirswall) the parish had a population of 76.

When elected parish and district councils were established following the Local Government Act 1894, Wirswall was too small to have a parish council, and so it had a parish meeting instead. In 1959, a grouped parish council was created covering the three civil parishes of Wirswall, Marbury cum Quoisley, and Norbury, called the Marbury and District Parish Council. In 2023, the three civil parishes within the group were merged into a single civil parish called Marbury and District.

== Notable people ==
The Victorian children's book illustrator Randolph Caldecott lived in Wirswall between 1861 and 1867, while working at the Whitchurch branch of the Whitchurch & Ellesmere Bank, and many of his illustrations feature local landscapes.

== See also ==
- Listed buildings in Wirswall
