= Burwardsley =

Village in Cheshire, England

Coordinates: 53.1°N 2.733333°W

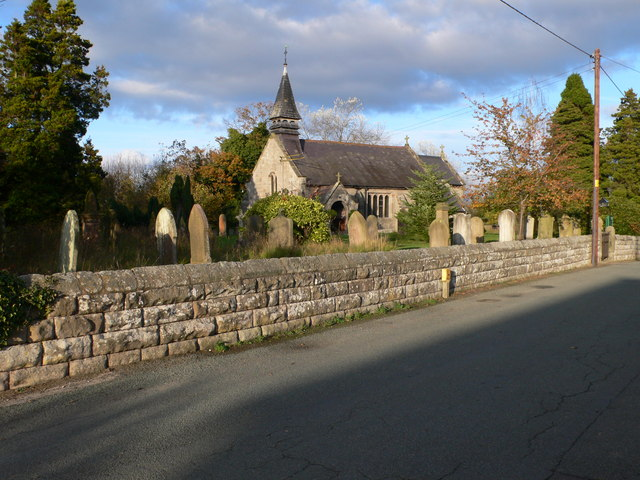
- Parish Church of St John the Divine

- Location within Cheshire
- Civil parish: Burwardsley
- Unitary authority: Cheshire West and Chester
- Ceremonial county: Cheshire
- Region: North West
- Country: England
- Sovereign state: United Kingdom
- Post town: CHESTER
- Postcode district: CH3
- Dialling code: 01829
- Police: Cheshire
- Fire: Cheshire
- Ambulance: North West
- UK Parliament: Chester South and Eddisbury

Burwardsley is a village and civil parish the unitary authority of Cheshire West and Chester and the ceremonial county of Cheshire, England. The parish also includes the small villages of Burwardsley, Burwardsley Hill, and Higher Burwardsley. The parish is part of two Cheshire long-distance footpaths, the Sandstone Trail, and the Eddisbury Way.

The parish church of St John the Divine in Burwardsley dates from 1730. The village has a village shop with post office and a pub, The Pheasant Inn, with views over the Cheshire plains to Wales and Merseyside. The pub claims to date from 1650, when there were three ale houses in Burwardsley; it was called The Pheasant in the 1970s.

The former primary school has been converted into an outdoor education centre.

== See also ==
- Listed buildings in Burwardsley
