= St Wenefrede's Church, Bickley =

Coordinates: 53.0364°N 2.6922°W

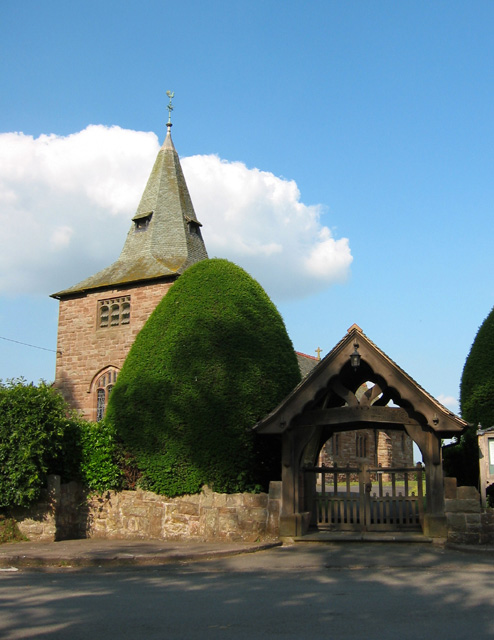
- St Wenefrede's Church, Bickley

- Location in Cheshire
- OS grid reference: SJ 536 490
- Location: Bickley, Cheshire
- Country: England
- Denomination: Anglican
- Website: St Wenefrede, Bickley

History
- Status: Parish church
- Dedication: St Wenefrede

Architecture
- Functional status: Active
- Heritage designation: Grade II
- Designated: 1 March 1967
- Architect: Douglas & Fordham
- Architectural type: Church
- Style: Gothic Revival
- Completed: 1892

Specifications
- Materials: Sandstone, roof green slates with terracotta ridge tiles

Administration
- Province: York
- Diocese: Chester
- Archdeaconry: Chester
- Deanery: Malpas
- Parish: St Wenefrede, Bickley

St Wenefrede's Church is in Bickley, Cheshire, England. The church is recorded in the National Heritage List for England as a designated Grade II listed building, and is an active Anglican parish church in the diocese of Chester, the archdeaconry of Chester, and the deanery of Malpas.

== History ==
The church was built in 1892 and designed by the Chester firm of Douglas and Fordham for the 4th Marquess of Cholmondeley.

== Architecture ==
The church is built in sandstone and has a roof of green slates with terracotta roof tiles. Its plan consists of a broad, low, west tower, a south porch against the tower, a three-bay nave with a narrow north passage-aisle, a chancel, and two north vestries. The tower is in two stages with a splay-footed octagonal spire. It has a three-light west window and three-light bell-openings in the stage above. Inside the church is a hammerbeam roof. There are texts on the roof beam, the pulpit and the organ case. In the church are two stained glass windows designed by J. E. Nuttgens.

== See also ==
- Listed buildings in Bickley, Cheshire
- List of new churches by John Douglas
