= Delamere Way =

Footpath in Cheshire, England

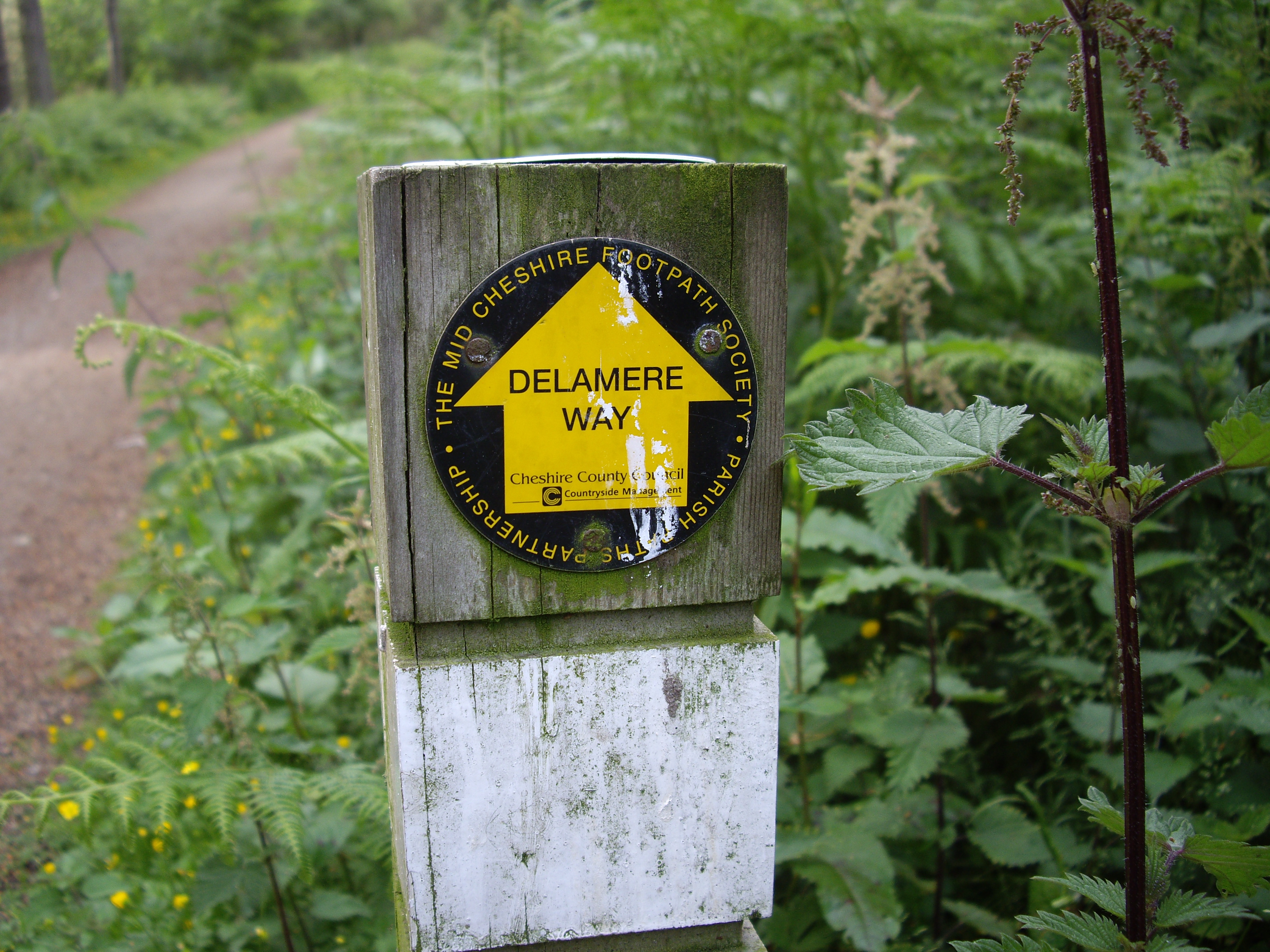
- The Delamere Way Waymarker
- Length: 21 mi (34 km)
- Location: Cheshire, England
- Trailheads: Stockton Heath; Frodsham
- Use: Hiking
- Season: All year

The Delamere Way is a footpath running from Stockton Heath to Frodsham within the English county of Cheshire. The total length of the trail is 21 miles (34 km).

== The route ==
The Delamere Way starts at the Bridgewater Canal bridge on the A49 road (known locally as London Road), opposite the London Bridge public house. The path then proceeds to the village of Hatton passing through the nearby Walton Hall Golf Club. The path crosses the M56 motorway and Whitley Brook as it navigates farmland towards the locks on the River Weaver at Dutton. The route then closely follows the railway to Acton Bridge and continues to Onston, Ruloe and Norley before entering Delamere Forest. The path meanders through the majority of the forest, passing Blake Mere lake, and briefly follows part of the Sandstone Trail which it then intersects further on. Upon leaving the forest the path continues on its way to Frodsham via Manley and Frodsham golf course, once again joining the Sandstone Trail close to the Bellemonte public house. The path finishes on Church Street, close to St Laurence's Church, Frodsham. The route is shown on Ordnance Survey Explorer Maps 267 and 276.
