= Baker Way =

Footpath in Cheshire, England

Coordinates: 53.1968°N 2.8798°W

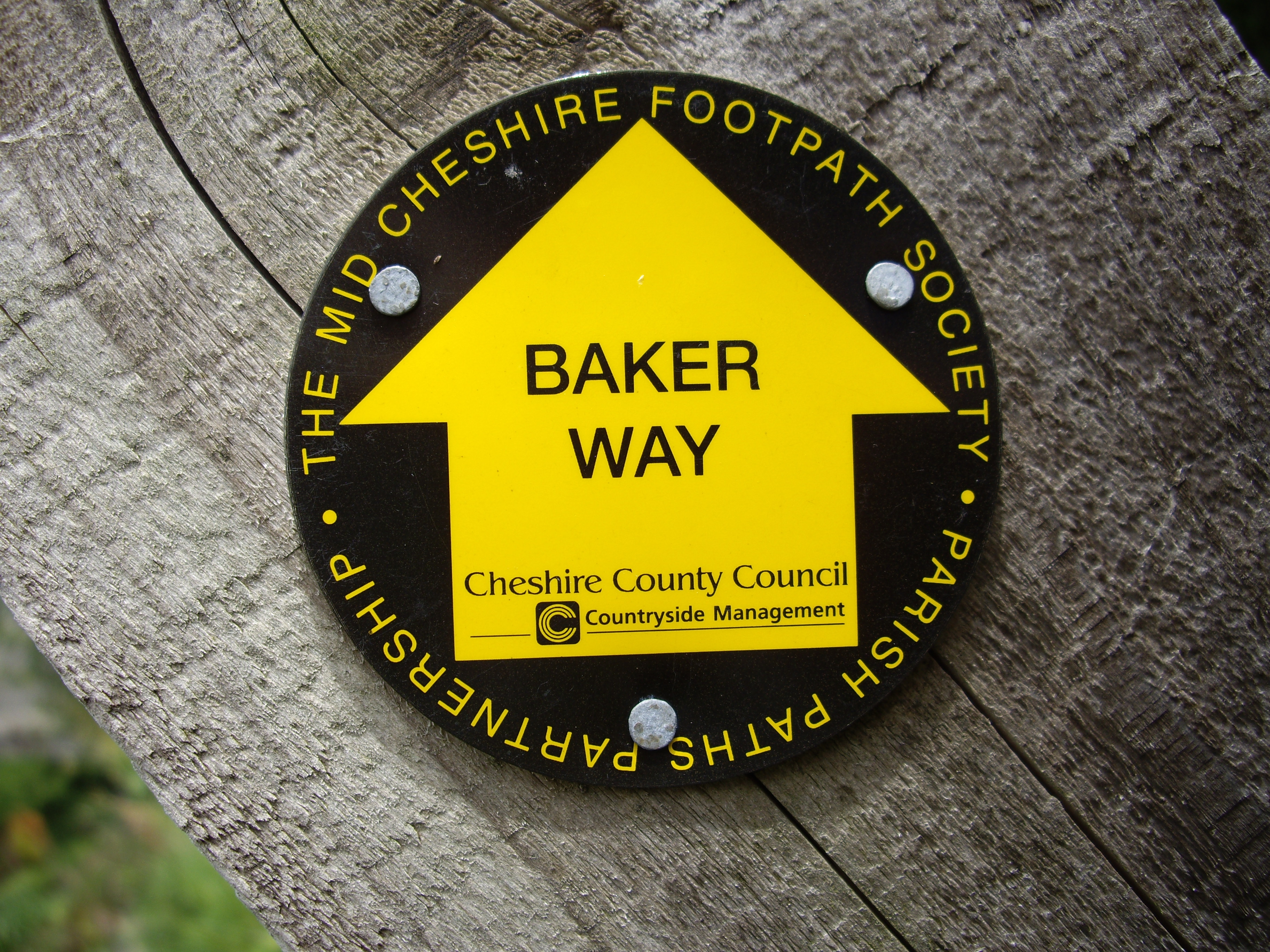
- A waymarker for the Baker Way
- Length: 13 mi (21 km)
- Location: Cheshire, England
- Trailheads: Chester; Delamere Forest
- Use: Hiking
- Season: All year

The Baker Way is a footpath running from Chester railway station to Delamere railway station within the English county of Cheshire. The total length of the trail is 13 miles (21 km). Its name commemorates the life and work of Jack Baker, a former footpaths officer for Cheshire County Council.

== The route ==
The Baker Way leaves Chester along the Shropshire Union Canal until bridge 120 at Christleton, where it then heads for Brown Heath before passing straight through Tarvin, along Hockenhull Lane and Tarvin High Street. It then crosses the A54 road and loops around the back of Ashton, just missing Mouldsworth. The path then crosses Church Road, Ashton, by the nearby St John the Evangelist's Church and then proceeds up Grange Road, which leads directly to the edge of Delamere Forest. The trail then passes by Fox Howl, the Forest's education centre, and crosses the Mid-Cheshire Line three times, the third time joining up with the Sandstone Trail for several hundred metres. The route then meanders through the forest to its end point at Delamere railway station. The route is shown on Ordnance Survey Explorer Maps 266 and 267.

Because the footpath starts and ends at railway stations, many walkers choose to park at one station, walk along the footpath to the opposite station and use the train to return. There are no waymarks from the start at Chester railway station, along City Road and then along the Shropshire Union Canal to Christleton. From bridge 120, where the Baker Way leaves the canal, the route is fairly well waymarked.

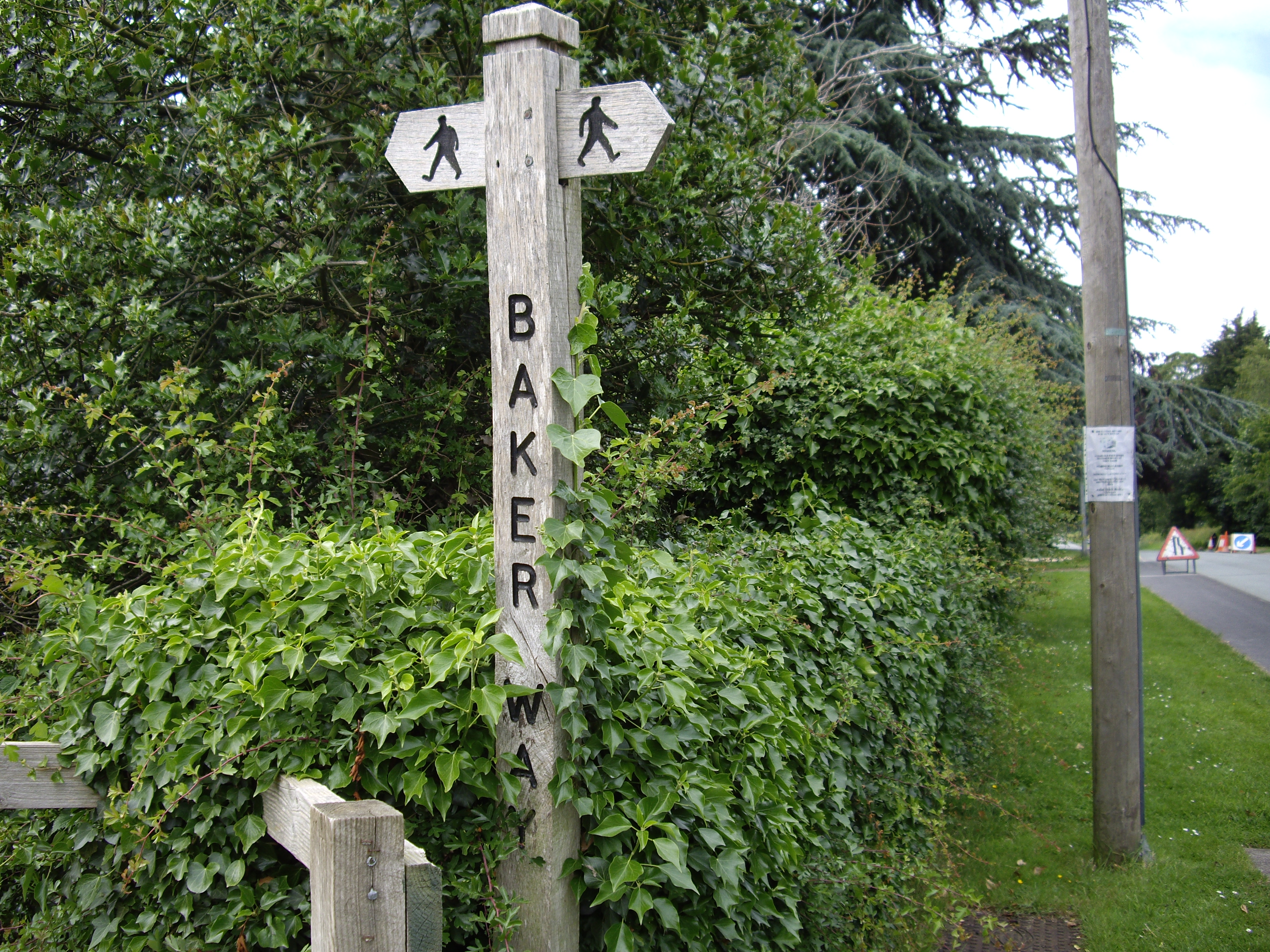
A Baker Way signpost near Waverton

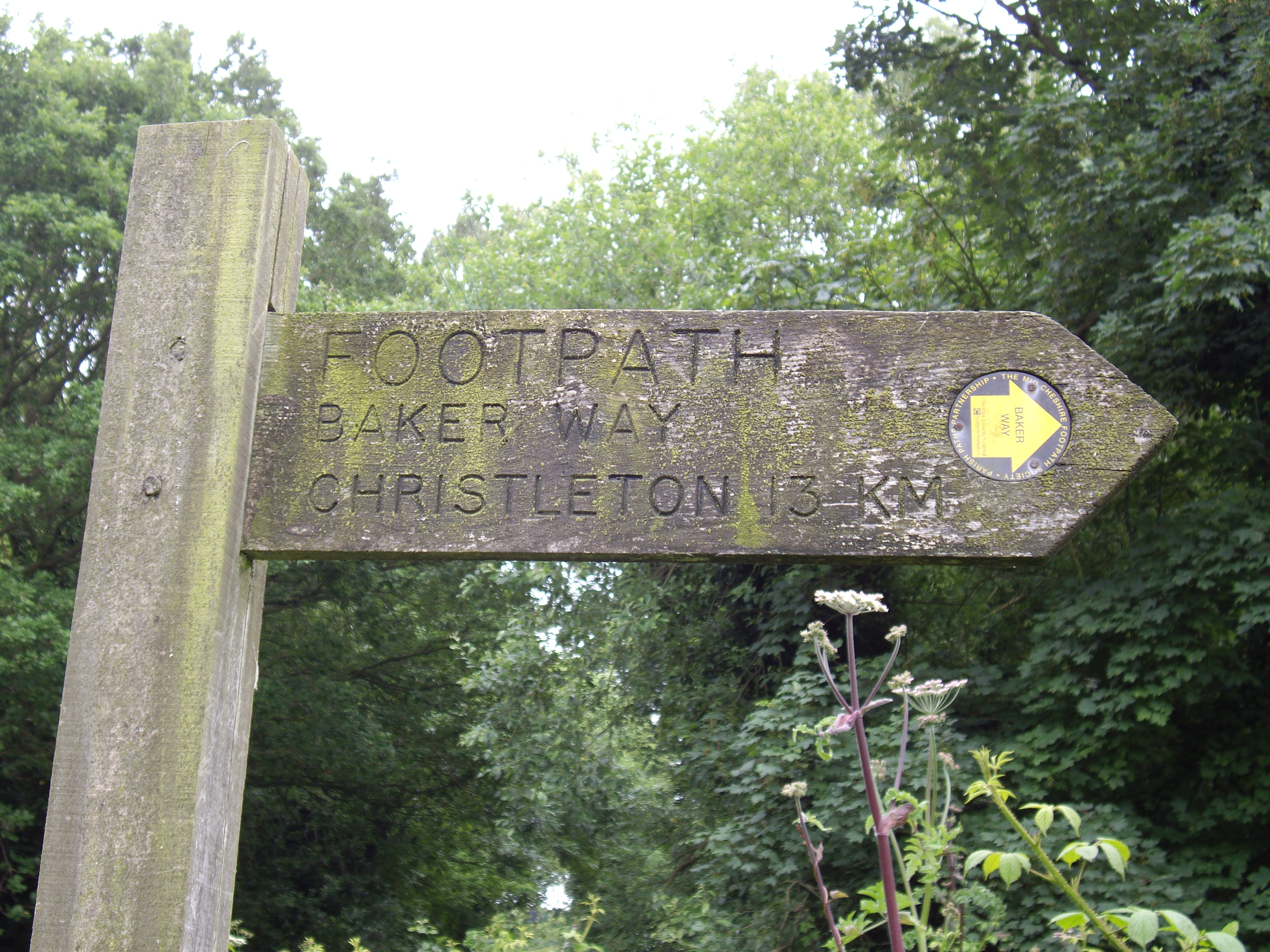
A Baker Way distance marker near Brines Brow picnic area, Delamere Forest

== Sights ==
Various sights are viewable along the Baker Way, such as Beeston Castle and Peckforton Castle, which can be seen from the fields surrounding Christleton and Brown Heath, and Ashton's church spire, which is a good landmark for navigation. Between Tarvin and Christleton the route crosses over the River Gowy at Hockenhull Platts, where there are three old packhorse bridges and a nature reserve. A review in The Guardian in 2024 summed the route up as having "stretches of open fields, stretches of middle-of-nowhere lanes and stretches of hushed forest" but "no real scenic climax"; the reviewer noted a section of exposed walking on a road near Delamere Forest.

== See also ==
- List of recreational walks in Cheshire
