= Sandstone Trail =

Long-distance footpath in England

Coordinates: 53.296°N 2.726°W

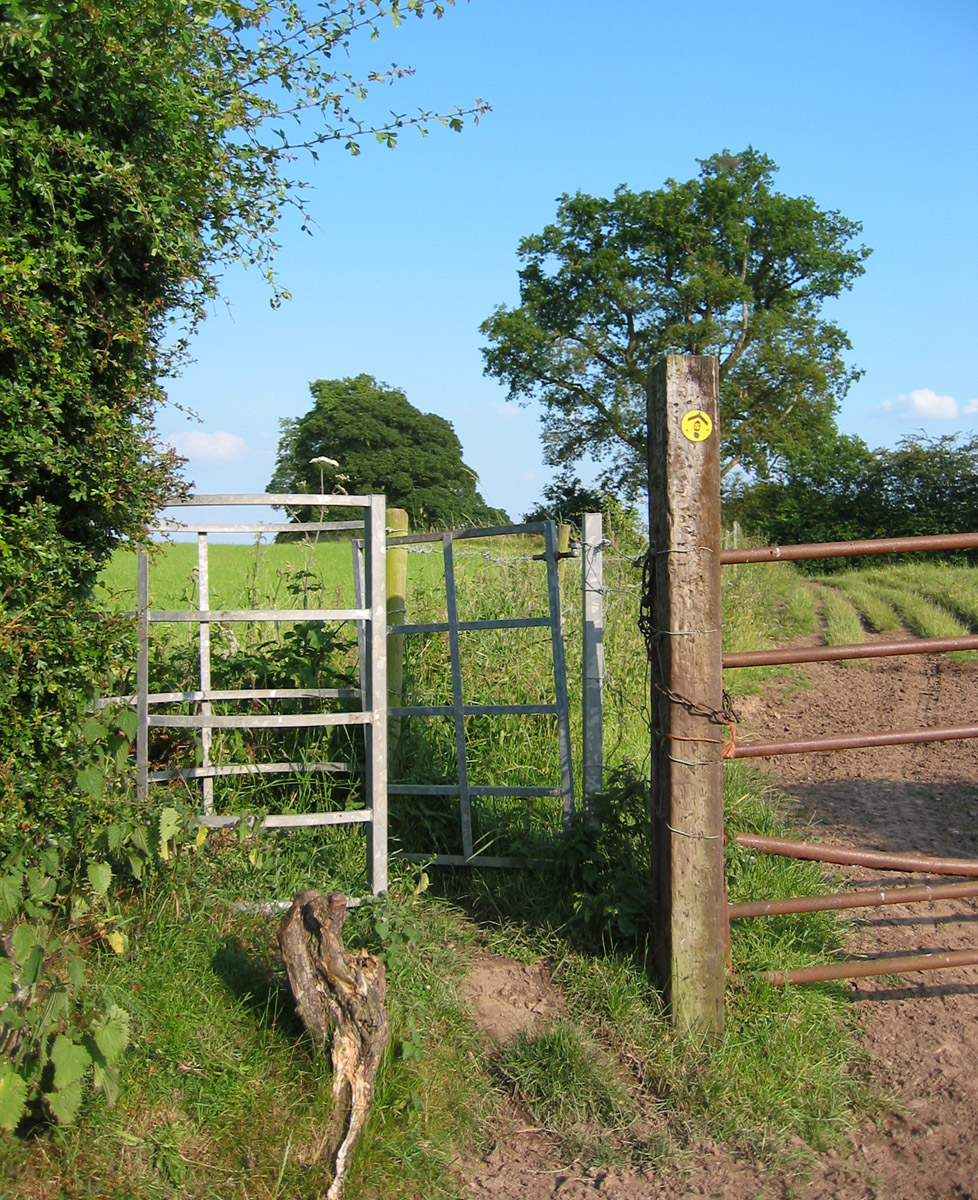
- A kissing gate and inscribed waymarker on the southern section of the Sandstone Trail near Bickley
- Length: 55 km (34 mi)
- Trailheads: Frodsham, Cheshire to Whitchurch, Shropshire
- Use: Hiking
- Elevation change: 1,268 metres (4,160 ft)
- Highest point: Raw Head, 227 m (745 ft)

The Sandstone Trail is a 55-kilometre (34 mi) long-distance walkers' path, following sandstone ridges running north–south from Frodsham in central Cheshire to Whitchurch just over the Shropshire border. The path was created in 1974 and extended in the 1990s. Much of the route follows the Mid Cheshire Ridge but in places the trail also passes through the Cheshire Plain, including farmland, woodland and canal towpaths.

== Route ==
The trail is divided into three sections of about 18 km (11.3 mi) in length: the northern portion runs from Frodsham to Willington, the central section covers Willington to Bickerton, and the southern part is from Bickerton to Whitchurch.

== Information and waymarking ==
The trail is marked with signposts and yellow discs inscribed with an 'S' in a footprint. Stone distance markers and blue information boards are also located at intervals, usually before or entering a new area of the trail. The information boards generally give details of local history while the stones give the distance in kilometres to the ends of the trail at Frodsham and Whitchurch. In some parts of the trail, it intermingles with the Baker Way in Delamere Forest for several hundred metres, which may cause walkers to accidentally follow the wrong trail by mistake without careful observation of the waymarks.

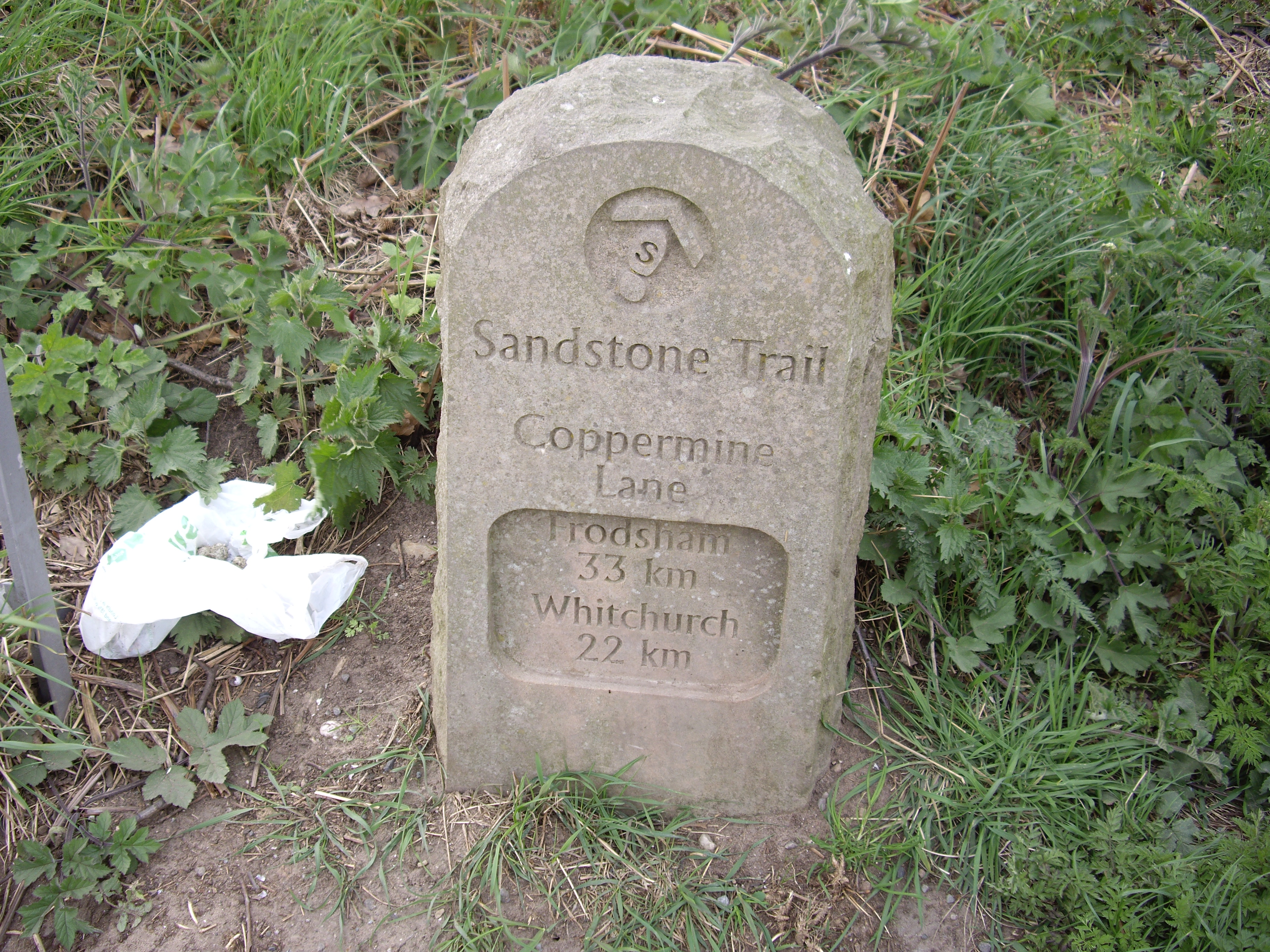
Distance marker on Coppermine lane

These stones are at:

- Ridgeway Wood, Helsby (5 km to Frodsham, 50 km to Whitchurch)
- Manley Common, New Pale Road, Manley (9 km to Frodsham, 46 km to Whitchurch)
- Barnsbridge Gates, Ashton Road, Delamere Forest (12 km to Frodsham, 43 km to Whitchurch)
- Willington Road, Willington (18 km to Frodsham, 37 km to Whitchurch)
- Wharton's Lock (26 km to Frodsham, 29 km to Whitchurch)
- Coppermine Lane, in between Rawhead and Bulkeley Hill (33 km to Frodsham, 22 km to Whitchurch)
- Bickerton (37 km to Frodsham, 18 km to Whitchurch)
- Bickleywood (45 km to Frodsham, 10 km to Whitchurch)
- Grindley Brook (51 km to Frodsham, 4 km to Whitchurch)

The ends of the trail are also marked with a sandstone obelisk outside the Bears Paw Public House at Frodsham, and a 2m high sandstone archway at the entrance of the car park at Jubilee Park, Whitchurch.

== Sights ==
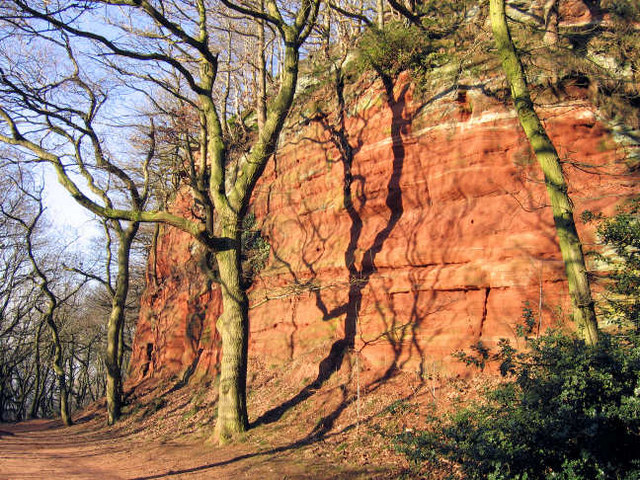
Rock formation on the northern section near Frodsham

Points of interest travelling from Frodsham to Whitchurch (north–south) include:

- Woodhouses hill fort, an Iron Age fort
- Alvanley Cliffs
- Delamere Forest and Eddisbury Hill
- Beeston Castle
- Peckforton Castle in the Peckforton Hills
- Burwardsley village
- Bickerton Hills and Maiden Castle, an Iron Age fort
- Wharton's & Willeymoor locks on the Shropshire Union Canal
- Grindley Brook, staircase lock on the Llangollen branch of the Shropshire Union Canal

On the clearest of days sights such as the Liver Building and Anglican Cathedral in Liverpool and the Essar Stanlow Oil Refinery at Ellesmere Port can be seen from many different locations including Bickerton Hill. Other famous landmarks visible from the trail include the Jodrell Bank Observatory, which can be seen from Bulkeley Hill.

== Races ==
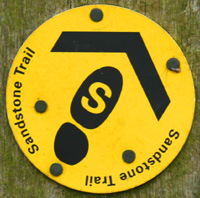
Trail marker

For many years the Fire Service organised a full traverse of the trail in a day, enjoyed by walkers and runners. In May 2011 the event was revived by Helsby Running Club as an LDWA event. The current record for the full traverse is held by Duncan Harris of Chester Tri, in 4 hours, 10 minutes. The women's best time is held by Caroline Hall of Wirral AC, in 5:04. The full race deviates slightly from the official route of the Sandstone Trail by finishing at Frodsham Community Centre, located about 0.25 mile from the obelisk at the Bear's Paw, and shortening the route by just 0.1 mile.

Part of the path is used for the Sandstone Trail Races in early October organised by Deeside Orienteering Club; the longer race has been run since 1977. The longer race (27.5 kilometres (17.1 mi), 655 metres (2,149 ft) of climbing) starts from Duckington (SJ494526), climbs to the ridge's high point at Raw Head (227 metres) and runs northwards to Barnes Bridge Gates in Delamere Forest. The shorter race (17 kilometres (10.6 mi), 288 metres (945 ft) of climbing) starts near Beeston Castle, finishing in the same place.

== See also ==
- List of recreational walks in Cheshire
