= Listed buildings in Bulkeley =

Bulkeley is a former civil parish in Cheshire East, England. It contained five buildings that are recorded in the National Heritage List for England as designated listed buildings. Of these, one is listed at Grade II*, the middle grade, and the others are at Grade II. Apart from the village of Bulkeley and the settlement of Bulkelehay, the parish was rural. The listed buildings consist of two country houses, farm buildings, a cottage, and a church.

== Key ==
Grade	Criteria
II*	Particularly important buildings of more than special interest
II	Buildings of national importance and special interest

== Buildings ==
Name and location	Photograph	Date	Notes	Grade
Springfield Cottage; 53.08280°N 2.70509°W	—	Late 17th century	The cottage is timber-framed with brick nogging, and has a corrugated metal sheet roof. It is in a single storey with an attic, and has a two-bay front. The windows are casements, those in the upper floor being in the gables and in a half-dormer. The entrance is in a 20th-century lean-to extension to the south and rear.	II
Bulkeley Hall; 53.07888°N 2.71329°W		Mid-18th century	A country house in brick with stone dressings and a hipped slate roof. It is in three storeys, and has a symmetrical front of seven bays. There is a rear extension, giving the house an L-shaped plan. In the centre of the entrance front is a doorway approached by four steps, and with a doorcase of fluted columns, a frieze, and a fanlight. The windows are sashes.	II*
Farm buildings, Bulkeley Grange; 53.08205°N 2.69593°W	—	Mid-19th century	The farm-buildings are constructed in brick with stone dressings and slate roofs, they are in two storeys, and form a U-shaped plan. The central block has a wide arched opening under a gable with bargeboards. Elsewhere in the buildings are more arched openings, square pitch holes, and ventilation holes.	II
Bulkeley Methodist Church; 53.08574°N 2.70047°W		1861	This was built as a Primitive Methodist chapel, and is in Georgian style. It is constructed in brick on a stone plinth, with stone dressings and a slate roof. The entrance is on the south side, and contains a doorway with a fanlight flanked by windows, above which is a pediment with a stone plaque in the tympanum. All the windows are round-headed and contain sashes.	II
Bulkeley Grange; 53.08175°N 2.69691°W	—	1867	The house was built by Thomas Brassey, replacing an earlier house on the site. It is constructed in brick on a stone plinth, with some applied half-timbering, and a slate roof, and is in Jacobean style. The house is in two storeys and has a gabled entrance front of three bays. There is a large stone porch with Jacobean pilasters and an open parapet. The windows are mullioned and transomed.	II

== See also ==
- Listed buildings in Peckforton
- Listed buildings in Ridley
- Listed buildings in Cholmondeley
- Listed buildings in Egerton
- Listed buildings in Bickerton
- Listed buildings in Burwardsley
