= Ridley, Cheshire =

Former civil parish in Cheshire, England

Coordinates: 53.085°N 2.665°W

Ridley
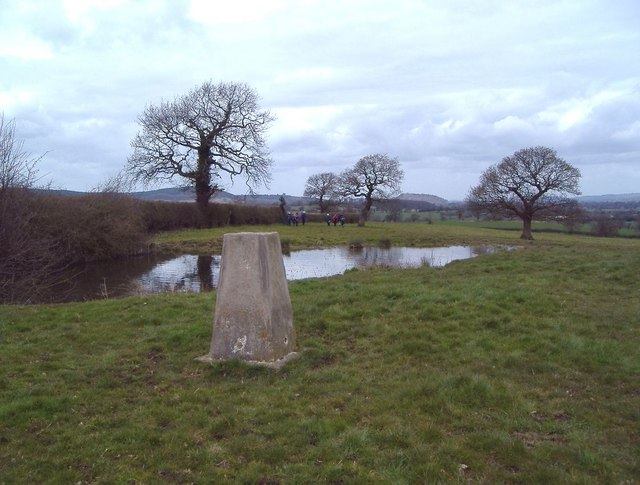
- Trig point, with the Peckforton Hills in the background

- Location within Cheshire
- Population: 120 (2001)
- OS grid reference: SJ554544
- Civil parish: Bulkeley and Ridley
- Unitary authority: Cheshire East
- Ceremonial county: Cheshire
- Region: North West
- Country: England
- Sovereign state: United Kingdom
- Post town: TARPORLEY
- Postcode district: CW6
- Dialling code: 01829
- Police: Cheshire
- Fire: Cheshire
- Ambulance: North West
- UK Parliament: Chester South and Eddisbury

Ridley is a former civil parish, now in the parish of Bulkeley and Ridley, in the unitary authority area of Cheshire East and the ceremonial county of Cheshire, England, which lies to the north east of Malpas and to the west of Nantwich. The parish is largely rural with scattered farms and buildings and no significant settlements. In 2001, the population was 120. Nearby villages include Bulkeley, Bunbury, Faddiley, Peckforton and Spurstow. At the 2011 Census the population had fallen less than 100. Details are included in the civil parish of Peckforton.

== Governance ==
Ridley is administered jointly with Bulkeley by the Bulkeley & Ridley Parish Council. Ridley was formerly a township in the parish of Bunbury, and from 1866 was a civil parish in its own right. On 1 April 2023 the parish was abolished and merged with Bulkeley to form "Bulkeley and Ridley".

From 1974 Ridley was served by Crewe and Nantwich Borough Council, which was succeeded on 1 April 2009 by the unitary authority of Cheshire East. Since 2024 Ridley has been in the parliamentary constituency of Chester South and Eddisbury which is represented by Aphra Brandreth.

== Geography and transport ==
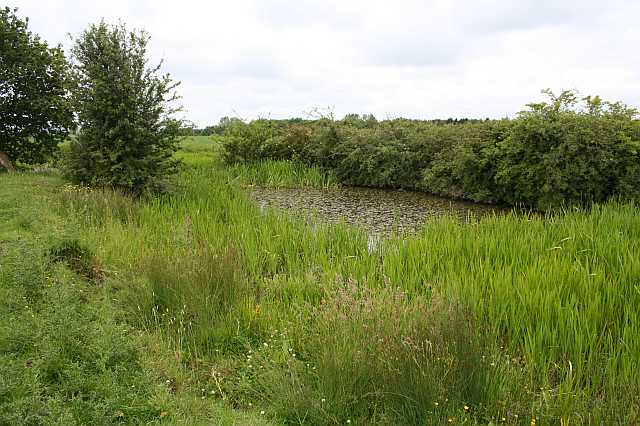
Pond on top of the hill in the east of the parish

The River Weaver runs north–south through the west of the civil parish and the River Gowy runs east–west along part of its northern border. Both rivers are close to their sources in the Peckforton Hills, which rise to the north west of Ridley. There is a low hill in the east of the civil parish, with a high point of 127 m at SJ567539, at the north part of Chesterton Wood. A mast and a covered reservoir are located on the top of the hill, and a trig point stands at SJ566542, around 100 metres north of the reservoir, at an elevation of 125 metres. The ground slopes gently downwards towards the Weaver in the west of the civil parish, with a low point of around 90 metres.

The land use is predominantly agricultural, particularly cattle pasture. Several small meres and ponds are scattered across the farmland. There are four small woods – Ridley Wood and Chesterton Wood in the north west of the parish, and The Moss and The Bache in the south east – as well as several smaller areas of unnamed woodland. The A49 and A534 roads run north–south and east–west through the parish, respectively.

== Landmarks ==
The Ridley Hall gatehouse (SJ5470254759) might have formed part of the "fine Ridley Hall" mentioned in Leland's Itinerary, which would date it at around 1530. It is listed at grade II*. The stone archway is topped with a brick storey under a slate roof, and is now flanked by later brick farm buildings. Above the archway on the south face is a carved stone tablet bearing the escutcheon of the Egerton family, flanked with horn players and animals. The grade-II-listed former primary school stands on the south side of the A534 at SJ5419854484. A T-shaped building of rock-faced sandstone incorporating a teacher's house, the school is in Gothic style and dates from 1876.

== Demography ==
According to the 2001 census, the civil parish had a population of 120. The population has been relatively constant since 1801, with historical population figures of 122 (1801), 133 (1851), 109 (1901) and 138 (1951).

== Education ==
There are no educational facilities within the civil parish. Ridley falls within the catchment areas of Bickerton Holy Trinity CE Primary School in Bickerton and Bishop Heber High School in Malpas.

== See also ==
- Listed buildings in Ridley, Cheshire
