= Bulkeley Hill Narrow Gauge Railway =

Former Railway in Cheshire, England

Coordinates: 53.0928°N 2.7067°W

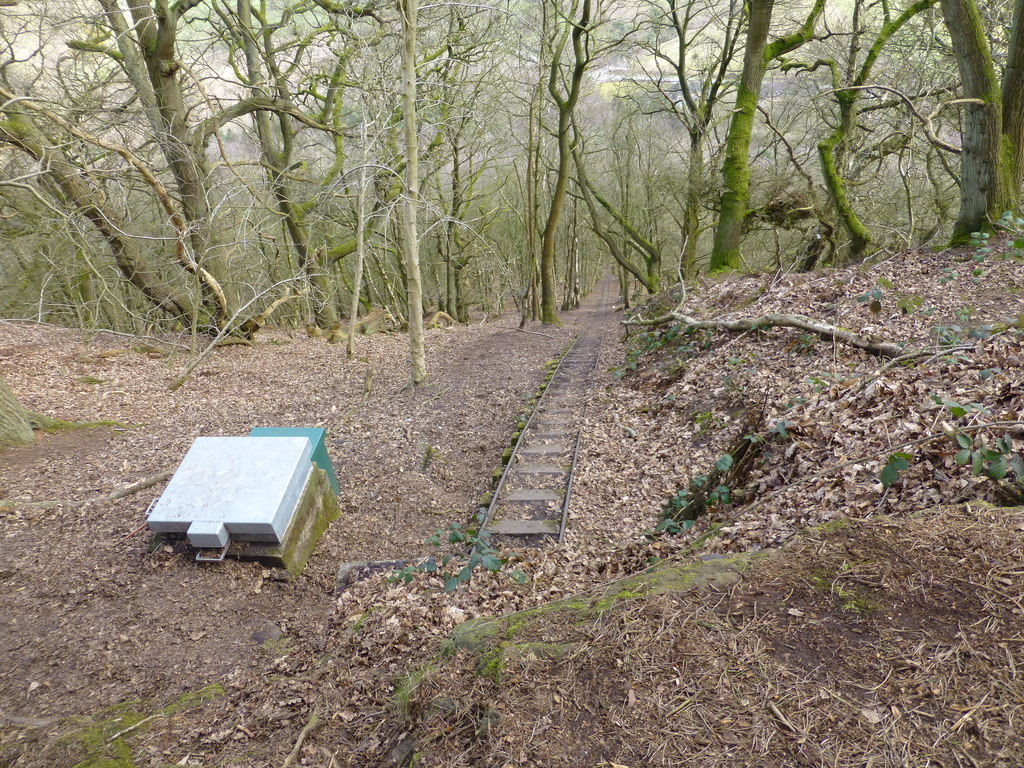
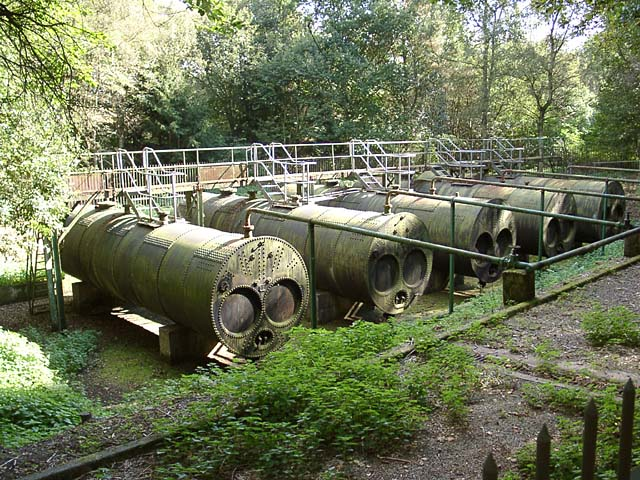
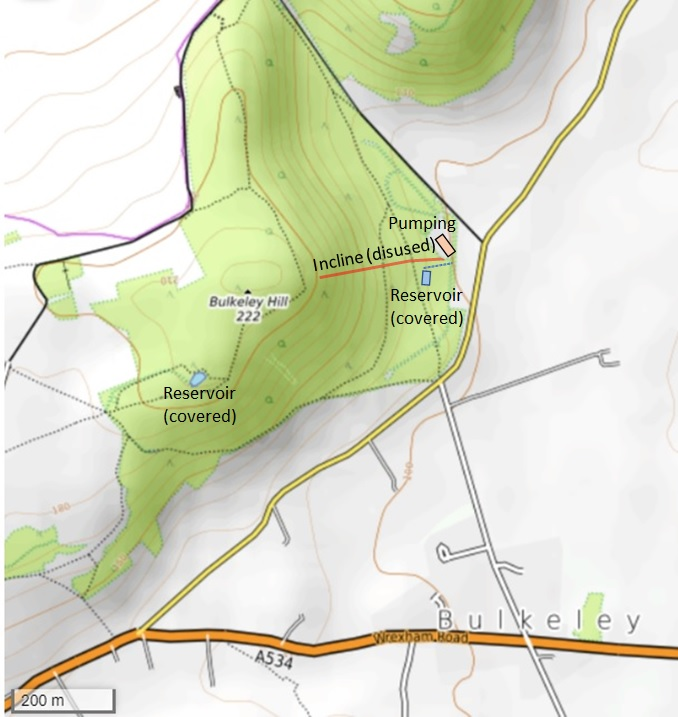
- Remains of the track at the top end, looking downwards 2016 Fuel tanks of pumping station at the bottom end, 2002 Incline (disused)

Technical
- Line length: 0.2 miles (0.32 km)
- Track gauge: 2 ft (610 mm)

The Bulkeley Hill Narrow Gauge Railway was a 350-yard (320 m) long 2 ft (610 mm) gauge rope-hauled incline on the Bulkeley Hill near Bulkeley in Cheshire, England. With a grade of nearly 1:1 in one section, it is known as Cheshire's Steepest Railway.

== History ==
The Staffordshire Potteries Water Board was granted permission in 1937 to build drinking water pumping stations at Peckforton and Tower Wood in Cheshire with a reservoir on Bulkeley Hill, from where the water was piped to a large reservoir at Cooper's Green near Audley for distribution to Tunstall and the Potteries. After the water was pumped into the elevated reservoir, it ran in a 27-inch pipeline (ø 686 mm) to the potteries.

The incline was used during the construction of the Bulkeley Hill Reservoir and the water pipeline to overcome a height difference of about 345 feet (105 m). It has three catch points for derailing runaway vehicles. At its bottom station, five reused Lancashire boilers are available as diesel storage tanks for the pumps.

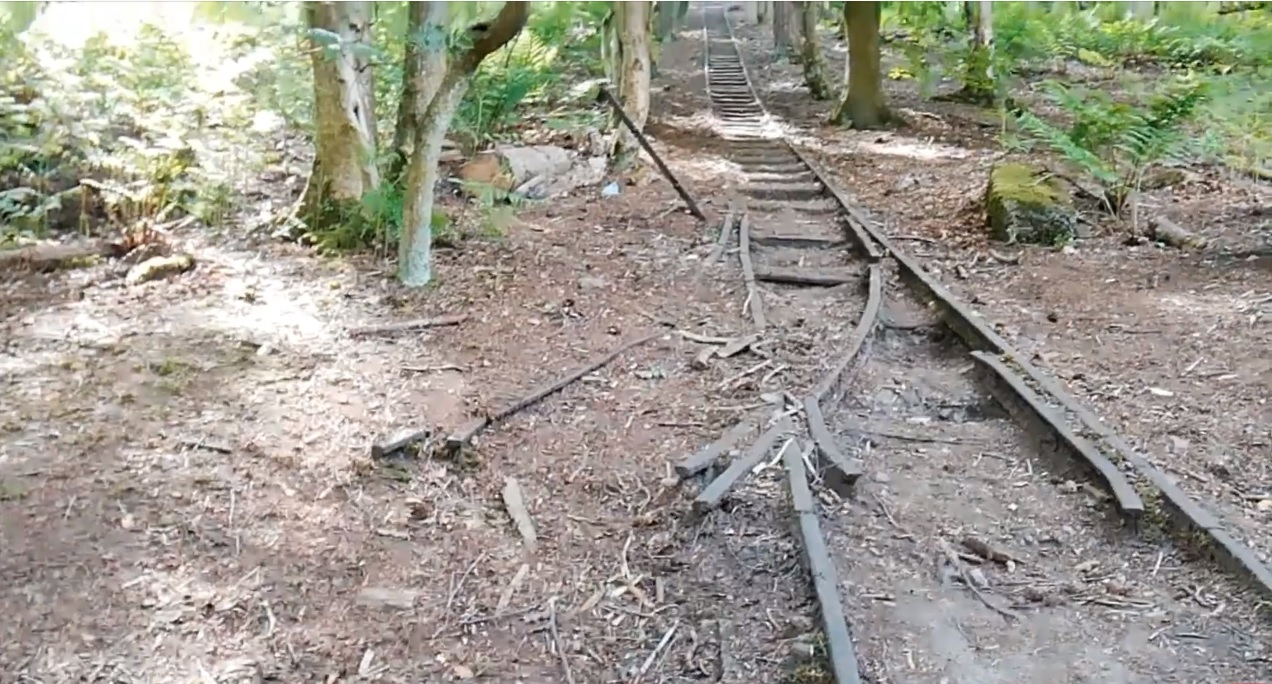
Catch point in the lower part, uphill view

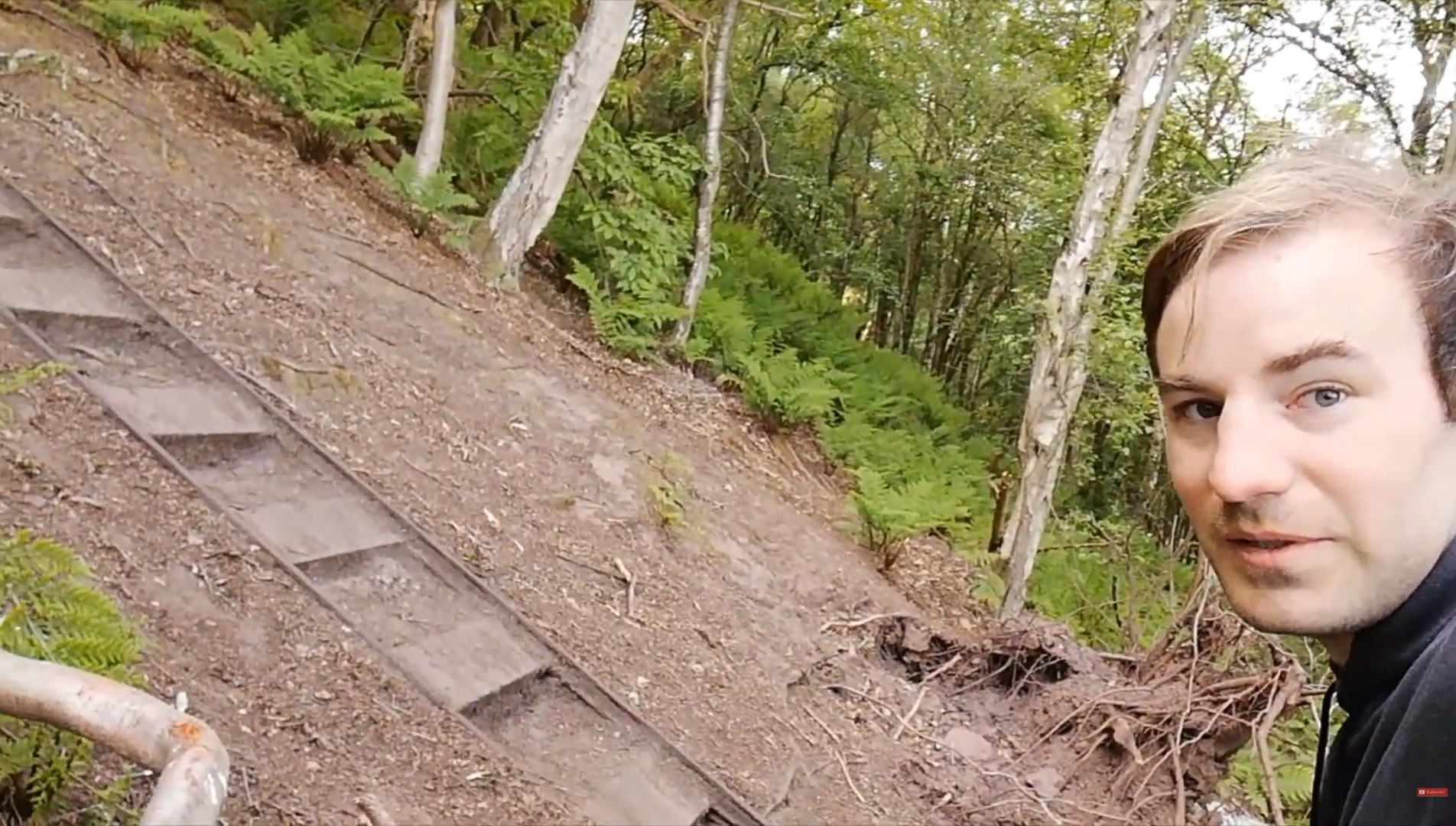
Steep area near the top, sidewards view

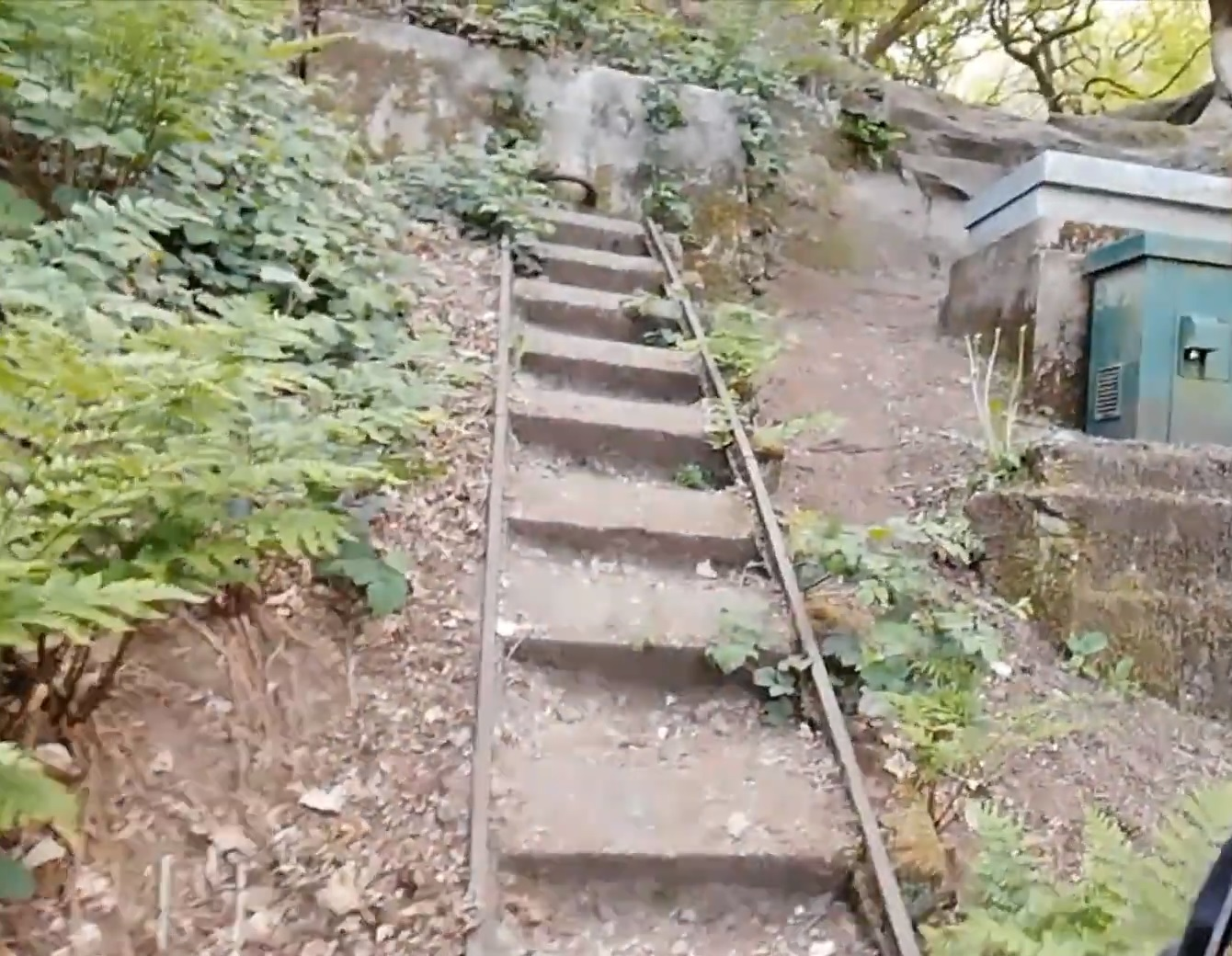
Top end, uphill view
