= Listed buildings in Burwardsley =

Burwardsley is a civil parish in Cheshire West and Chester, England. It contains five buildings that are recorded in the National Heritage List for England as designated listed buildings, all of which are at Grade II. This grade is the lowest of the three gradings given to listed buildings and is applied to "buildings of national importance and special interest". The parish is entirely rural, its listed buildings consisting of a church, a public house, a farmhouse, a farm building, and a cottage.

Name and location	Photograph	Date	Notes
Pheasant Inn; 53.1042°N 2.7135°W		Late 16th century	Originating as a farmhouse, it has later been used as a public house. It was extended in the 18th century, and additions were made in the 20th century. The building is basically timber-framed with brick nogging on a stone plinth. Additions have been in stone and in brick. It is in two storeys, and has a five-bay front.
Lowerhill Farmhouse; 53.1010°N 2.7333°W		Late 16th to early 17th century	The building originated as a farmhouse and a shippon, and was later converted into a house. It is partly timber-framed on a stone plinth, and partly sandstone. It has an L-shaped plan, and is in 1 1/2 storeys, with a six-bay front. The windows are casements in the lower storey, and gabled half-dormers above.
St John's Church; 53.1035°N 2.7251°W		17th century	The church was restored in 1795. In 1871 John Douglas carried out a further restoration during which he added a bell turret at the west end and, in about 1878, he added the chancel. The church is constructed in sandstone with a slate roof, and consists of a nave, a chancel with a side chapel, and a south porch.
Farm building, Grig Hill Farm; 53.0958°N 2.7117°W	—	Late 17th century	This originated as a cottage and barn, and was later used as a farm building. It is constructed partly in sandstone, and partly in timber framing. The thatched roof is covered in corrugated iron. The building has an L-shaped plan, and is in one and two storeys.
Cherry Cottage; 53.1026°N 2.7262°W	—	Late 18th century	This consists of a cottage with a shippon added in the early 19th century. It is constructed in sandstone with a slate roof. The building is in one range, with 1 1/2 storeys, and a four-bay front. In the ground floor are casement windows, with gabled half-dormers above. The bay at the right end is the shippon. This contains a split door, with a square pitch hole above it.

== See also ==
- Listed buildings in Beeston
- Listed buildings in Bickerton
- Listed buildings in Broxton
- Listed buildings in Bulkeley
- Listed buildings in Harthill
- Listed buildings in Peckforton
- Listed buildings in Tattenhall
