= Listed buildings in Harthill, Cheshire =

Harthill is a civil parish in Cheshire West and Chester, England. It contains ten buildings that are recorded in the National Heritage List for England as designated listed buildings. One of these is listed at Grade II*, the middle grade, and the rest are at the lowest grade, Grade II. Apart from the village of Harthill, the parish is entirely rural. Other than an outlying cottage, all the listed buildings are in the village, and include cottages, the school, the church and associated structures.

== Key ==
Grade	Criteria
II*	Particularly important buildings of more than special interest
II	Buildings of national importance and special interest

== Buildings ==
Name and location	Photograph	Date	Notes	Grade
Cross; 53.09243°N 2.74726°W	—	11th or 12th century	The cross is in the churchyard of All Saints. It is in sandstone, and consists of a square stem on a square plinth, itself on a square base. The top is also square and is inscribed with wheel motifs and flutes.	II
All Saints Church; 53.0925°N 2.7470°W		1609	The church replaced an earlier chapel. It was restored in 1862–63 when the vestry and a larger belfry were added. The church is built in sandstone with a slate roof. The nave and chancel are in one range and have a hammerbeam roof. Inside the church is the framework of a screen bearing the date 1609.	II*
Sundial; 53.09235°N 2.74690°W	—	1778	The sundial is in the churchyard of All Saints. It consists of a buff sandstone column with a square top, standing on a millstone base. Around the top are inscribed initials and the date. The plate is missing.	II
1 and 2 The Green; 53.09205°N 2.74680°W		1844	A pair of estate cottages built for George Walmesley. They are constructed in sandstone and have slate roofs. The cottages are in two storeys, with a symmetrical five-bay front. The central bay projects forward under a gable. In the second and fourth bays are projecting porches. The windows, other than a diamond-shaped window in the gable, were inserted in the 20th century.	II
3 and 4 The Green; 53.09205°N 2.74661°W		1844	A pair of estate cottages built for George Walmesley. They are constructed in sandstone and have slate roofs. The cottages are in two storeys, with a symmetrical four-bay front. The central two bays project forward under gables. In the gables are square panels containing a shield in a quatrefoil. The outer bays have projecting porches. The windows were inserted in the 20th century.	II
5 The Green; 53.09198°N 2.74627°W	—	1844	An estate cottage built for George Walmesley. It is constructed in sandstone with a slate roof. The cottages has an L-shaped plan, is in two storeys, and has a three-bay front. The left bay projects forward under a traceried gable with a bargeboard. In the central bay is a projecting porch. The windows were altered in the 20th century.	II
Mickerdale Cottage; 53.09514°N 2.73779°W		c. 1860	The cottage and attached shippon were designed for Robert Barbour, probably by James Harrison. They are built in sandstone with a slate roof, and have an H-shaped plan. The building is in one and two storeys, with a three-bay front. The left bay projects forward under a gable. The central bay contains an arcade of three arched entrances. The right bay has a gable containing a large decorative cross, the circular ends of which act as ventilators.	II
Fountain and well head 53.09223°N 2.74630°W		1862	The fountain and well head were built for Robert Barbour. The structure is in sandstone, and in Gothic style. It has a rectangular plan, with gabled ends, and a blocked well between. It is inscribed with initials, the date, and a text, and embellished with the Barbour arms.	II
School and schoolmaster's house 53.0923°N 2.7461°W		1868	The school and house are built in red sandstone with slate roofs, and were designed by Thomas Lockwood for Robert Barbour. The building is in one and two storeys, has an H-shaped plan and a five-bay front. The left bay is the schoolroom, and has a triple lancet window, a clock, and a bellcote with a pyramidal roof. The second bay contains a gabled porch flanked by columns. The right bay has a bay window under a gable; the other bays have dormers.	II
Barbour Mausoleum; 53.09243°N 2.74668°W		1885	The mausoleum in the churchyard of All Saints is to members of the Barbour family of Bolesworth Castle. It is built in sandstone with granite dressings, it has a rectangular plan, and on each side are pilasters flanking inscribed panels.	II

== See also ==
- Listed buildings in Broxton
- Listed buildings in Bickerton
- Listed buildings in Burwardsley
