= Listed buildings in Peckforton =

Peckforton is a civil parish in Cheshire East, England. It contains 21 buildings that are recorded in the National Heritage List for England as designated listed buildings. Of these, one is listed at Grade I, the highest grade, four are listed at Grade II*, the middle grade, and the others are at Grade II. The most important structure in the parish is Peckforton Castle, a Victorian country house built for John Tollemache in the form of a Norman castle. This, its chapel, and its entrance lodge are listed, as are a farm and cottages on the former Tollemache estate. The other listed buildings are all houses or cottages, and a large carving of an elephant and castle.

== Key ==
Grade	Criteria
I	Buildings of exceptional interest, sometimes considered to be internationally important
II*	Particularly important buildings of more than special interest
II	Buildings of national importance and special interest

== Buildings ==
Name and location	Photograph	Date	Notes	Grade
Manor Farm Cottage and Yew Tree Cottage; 53.10242°N 2.69060°W	—	Early 17th century	A pair of timber-framed cottages on a brick plinth with brick nogging and a tiled roof. They are in two storeys, and have a front of three bays; the left bay projects forward, giving the building an L-shaped plan. The south gable is in sandstone, and the windows are casements.	II
Wood Cottages; 53.09855°N 2.66187°W	—	Early 17th century	The cottage is basically timber-framed with a thatched roof. It is in two storeys, and has a front of four bays. There is a wing to the north, giving it an L-shaped plan. The windows are mullioned, containing casements with lattice glazing. The cottage is largely plastered and parts have been encased in brick.	II
Black and White Cottage; 53.10385°N 2.69096°W		Late 17th century	A timber-framed cottage with brick nogging on a sandstone plinth with a thatched roof. It has a T-shaped plan, the wing to the rear being in brick. The cottage is in a single storey with an attic. The windows are casements with lattice glazing. A small byre is incorporated into the building.	II*
Garden Cottage; 53.11204°N 2.69139°W		Late 17th century	A timber-framed cottage with brick nogging on a sandstone plinth and a slate roof. It is in two storeys, and has a four-bay front. The windows are casements with lattice glazing.	II
Hill Lane Cottage; 53.10546°N 2.69145°W		Late 17th century	The cottage is timber-framed with brick nogging on a stone plinth and has a tiled roof. It has an L-shaped plan and is in a single storey with an attic. The windows are casements with lattice glazing.	II
Hillside Cottage; 53.09766°N 2.69735°W	—	Late 17th century	A timber-framed cottage with brick nogging and a tiled roof. The plinth and south walls are in sandstone. The cottage is in a single storey with an attic, and has a two-bay front. The windows are casements with lattice glazing, those in the upper storey being in gabled dormers and in the west gable. Against the east gable is a lean-to piggery.	II
Peckforton Hall; 53.10504°N 2.68115°W	—	Late 17th century	A brick farmhouse on a sandstone plinth with a slate roof. It is in two storeys with an attic. and has a double-pile plan, with a front of two gabled bays. The windows are mullioned and transomed, containing casements with lattice glazing.	II*
Farm building, Peckforton Hall; 53.10450°N 2.68031°W		Late 17th century	A barn in two storeys, with a front of four bays. The lower storey is in stone, and the upper storey is timber-framed. The barn has a slate roof, and some of the timber framing has been replaced in brick.	II
Rock Cottage; 53.10520°N 2.69126°W		Late 17th century	The cottage is in sandstone with timber-framing in the gables, and has a thatched roof. It is single-storey with an attic, and has an extension to the left. The window are casements.	II
Smithy Cottage; 53.10531°N 2.69107°W		Late 17th century	The cottage is partly timber-framed with brick nogging on a stone plinth, and partly in stone, and it has a tiled roof. It is in a single storey with an attic, and has a two-bay front. There is a single-storey stone extension to the right. The windows contain lattice glazing, those in the upper floor being in gabled half-dormers.	II
The Gap; 53.09439°N 2.70439°W	—	Late 17th century	A stone cottage with a timber-framed gable and a tiled roof. It is in a single storey with an attic. The windows are casements, those in the upper floor being in gabled half-dormers.	II
Peckforton Castle; 53.11778°N 2.69939°W		1844–50	A country house designed in the style of a castle by Anthony Salvin for John Tollemache. It is constructed in sandstone with buildings arranged around a ward, and surrounded by a dry moat. They are mainly in three storeys, with a tower of five storeys. On the north is the great hall range of 18 bays, and on the west side are stables, a coach house, a rectangular bell tower, kitchens, and a service area.	I
Chapel, Peckforton Castle; 53.11729°N 2.69925°W	—	Mid 19th century	The chapel was designed by Anthony Salvin, and is built in sandstone with a tiled roof. It consists of a two-bay nave with a south aisle, a baptistry, and a narrower and lower single-bay chancel. On the east gable of the nave is a hexagonal bellcote with a pyramidal roof and a weathervane.	II*
Entrance lodge, Peckforton Castle; 53.11317°N 2.69162°W		Mid 19th century	The entrance lodge is built in stone and consists of a round turret with a conical roof, an archway, and a lodge in two storeys and three bays.	II*
Elephant and Castle sculpture 53.10454°N 2.69136°W		c. 1859	A carving by a local stonemason in sandstone depicting an elephant carrying a howdah in the form of a castle, standing in the garden of a cottage. The castle is in three tiers, and has a gatehouse with a turret and a keep with corner turrets; all the turrets are crenelated and contain arrow slits. There is glass in the castle windows.	II
Fountain Cottages; 53.10801°N 2.69102°W		c. 1860	A pair of estate cottages in brick on a sandstone plinth with tiled roofs. They are in a single storey with attics, and each cottage has a front of two bays. Both cottages have central recessed arched porches. The windows are casements with lattice glazing, those in the upper floor being in gabled dormers. In the centre are chimneys with diagonally-set flues.	II
Green Cottage and Mill Beck Cottage; 53.10383°N 2.69044°W		c. 1860	A pair of estate cottages in brick with tiled roofs. They are in a single storey with attics, and have a front of three bays. The right bay projects forward and is gabled, the other bays contain dormers; all have shaped bargeboards and finials. The windows are casements with lattice glazing.	II
Hillside Farm House; 53.09558°N 2.69893°W	—	c. 1870	An estate farmhouse in brick with a tiled roof. It is in a single storey with an attic, and has an L-shaped plan, with three bays in each range. The windows contain lattice glazing, those in the upper floor being in gables or gabled dormers with finials.	II
Farm building, Hillside Farm; 53.09564°N 2.69842°W	—	c. 1870	A brick shippon with a tiled roof. It has an L-shaped plan with ranges of five and three bays, and is in two storeys. It contains full and half-heck doors, casement windows with lattice glazing, hopper lights, and round pitch holes. The west gable is timbered.	II
Manor Farm House; 53.10355°N 2.68829°W		c. 1870	The farmhouse is in brick with a tiled roof. It is in two storeys, and has a three-bay front. The left bay has a gable and the other bays contain gabled half-dormers; all of these have applied timber-framing. There is also a gabled porch with a finial. The windows contain lattice glazing.	II
Farm buildings, Manor Farm; 53.10381°N 2.68790°W	—	c. 1870	The farm buildings are in brick with a tiled roof. They are in two storeys and have an L-shaped plan, consisting of a three-bay west wing and a four-bay south wing. The buildings contain casement windows with lattice glazing, hopper lights, and round pitch holes. The south gable has been painted to simulate timber-framing.	II

== See also ==
- Listed buildings in Spurstow
- Listed buildings in Ridley
- Listed buildings in Bulkeley
- Listed buildings in Burwardsley
- Listed buildings in Beeston
