= Gowy Meadows Nature Reserve =

Nature reserve in Cheshire, United Kingdom

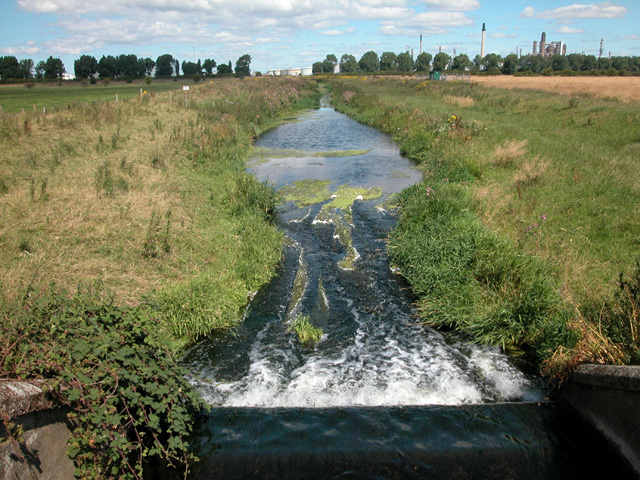
- River Gowy within the reserve

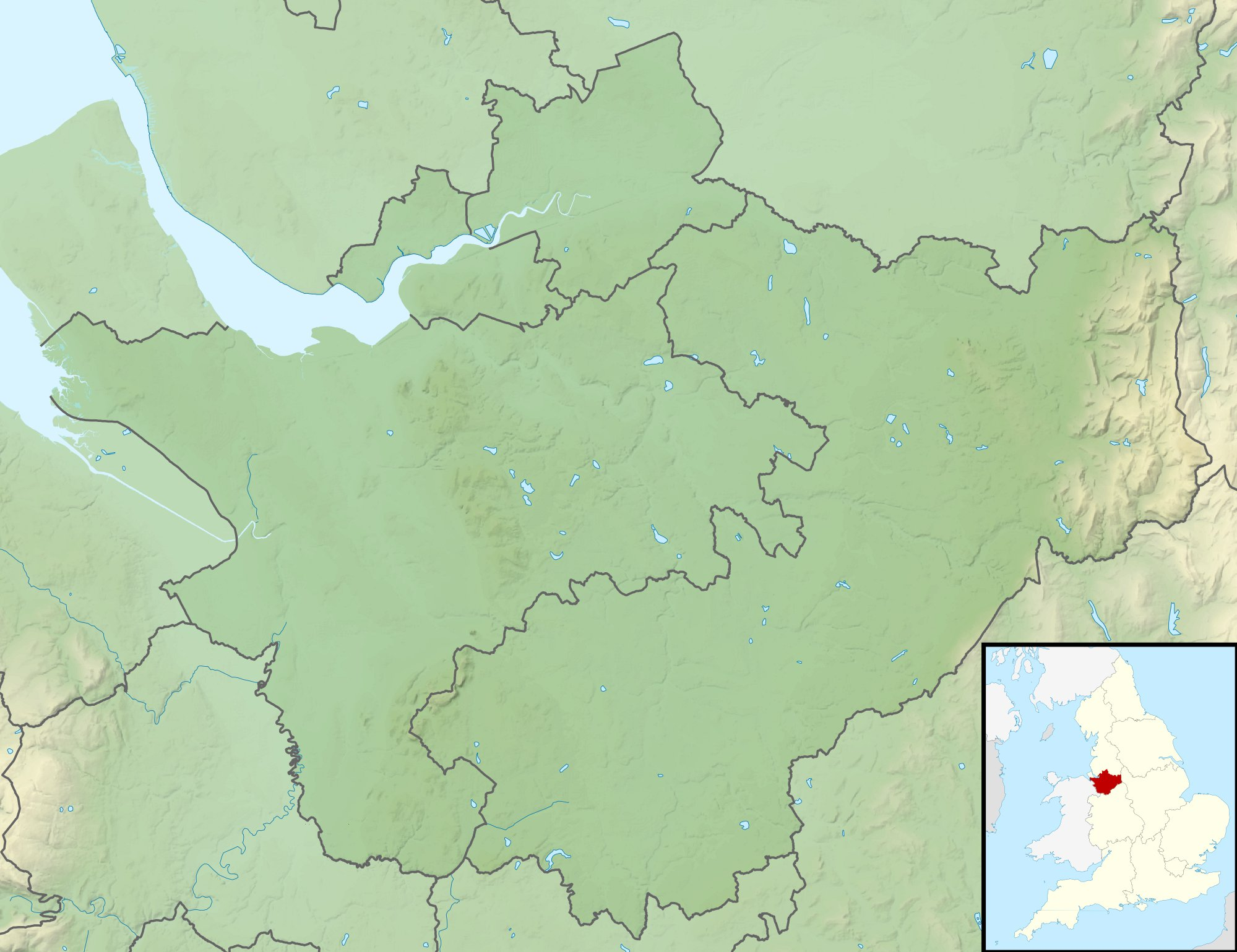
- Location within Cheshire
- Type: Nature reserve
- Location: near Thornton-le-Moors, Cheshire
- OS grid: SJ435740
- Coordinates: 53.2604°N 2.8477°W
- Area: 165.80 hectares (409.7 acres)
- Elevation: 5 metres (16 ft)
- Established: 2002
- Operator: Cheshire Wildlife Trust
- Open: at all times

Gowy Meadows Nature Reserve is a 165.8-hectare (410-acre) nature reserve near Ellesmere Port, Cheshire, England. It consists of low-lying meadows immediately to the east of the River Gowy near its confluence with the River Mersey, south of Stanlow Oil Refinery and west of the village of Thornton-le-Moors (from where a public footpath follows Thornton Brook across the site). It is managed by the Cheshire Wildlife Trust on behalf of the landowner, Shell UK, and was founded in 2002. The M56 motorway runs along the southern edge of the reserve.

The reserve consists mainly of low-lying wet pasture divided by ditches. It is part of the Gowy & Mersey Washlands Living Landscape initiative. Before the construction of the Manchester Ship Canal the Gowy would have been tidal in this area and much of the reserve would have consisted of saltmarsh with brackish creeks, whose traces can still be seen in places.

== Notable species ==
The pastureland is dominated by soft rush (Juncus effusus) and tufted hair-grass (Deschampsia cespitosa). Locally uncommon plants include meadow rue (Thalictrum flavum), brown sedge (Carex disticha), water violet (Hottonia palustris), whorl-grass (Catabrosa aquatica) and the carnivorous bladderwort (Utricularia australis). Five specimens of black poplar (Populus nigra ssp. betulifolia) grow on site; this tree, uncommon in the UK, is near the northwestern limit of its range.

The reserve has valuable populations of aquatic invertebrates, including the "vulnerable" mud snail (Omphiscola glabra) and range-restricted lesser silver water beetle (Hydrochara caraboides). Water voles (Arvicola amphibius) breed in the ditches, and otters (Lutra lutra) are known to use the Gowy. Birdlife includes occasional breeding snipe (Gallinago gallinago), lapwing (Vanellus vanellus) and good numbers of stonechat (Saxicola rubicola).
