= Bulkeley Hall =

Country house in Cheshire, England

Coordinates: 53.07888°N 2.71329°W

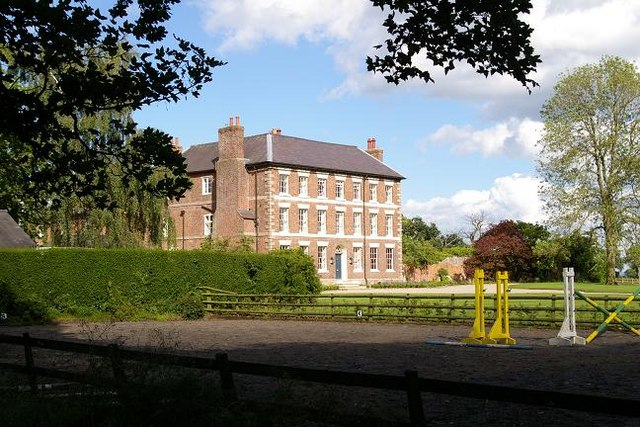
Bulkeley Hall

Bulkeley Hall is a country house to the southwest of the village of Bulkeley, Cheshire, England. It dates from the middle of the 18th century, and was built for Thomas Bulkeley. The house is constructed in a Flemish bond brick with a slate roof, and features stone quoins, sash windows, stone sills and lintels with central pediments. Its architectural style is Georgian. The entrance front has three storeys, and is in seven bays. A service wing at right-angles gives it an L-shaped plan. The interior contains 18th-century plasterwork and joinery. The hall is situated on grounds that cover over 100 acres, and includes a lake, woodland, and formal gardens. The house is recorded in the National Heritage List for England as a designated Grade II* listed building.

== History ==
Thomas Bulkeley (1706-1802) built Bulkeley Hall in about 1750. He was a member of the Bulkeley family which had owned land in this area for centuries. He was the son of Robert Bulkeley (1686-1735) and Martha Lloyd (1687-1763). In 1731 he married Mary Whitfield who was from Chester. The couple had two children. A son who died in 1787 and a daughter. When Thomas died in 1802 he had a large fortune but as he had no male living heirs he left his estate to his nephew Thomas Orton.

Thomas Orton (1747-1822) was the son of Thomas Orton and Martha Bulkeley, Thomas Bulkeley’s sister. In 1787 he married Betty Sandbach (1764-1827) who was the daughter of William Sandbach of Tarporley. The couple had two sons and five daughters. The Orton family mainly lived in Bank House in Tattenhall. When Thomas died in 1822 he left all of his estate in Trust mainly for the benefit of his two sons Robert Bulkeley Orton (1790-1866) and Thomas Orton (1802-1855). Both were unmarried and had no heirs so when Robert died in 1866 all of the property was sold. It was bought by Robert Barbour of Bolesworth Castle.

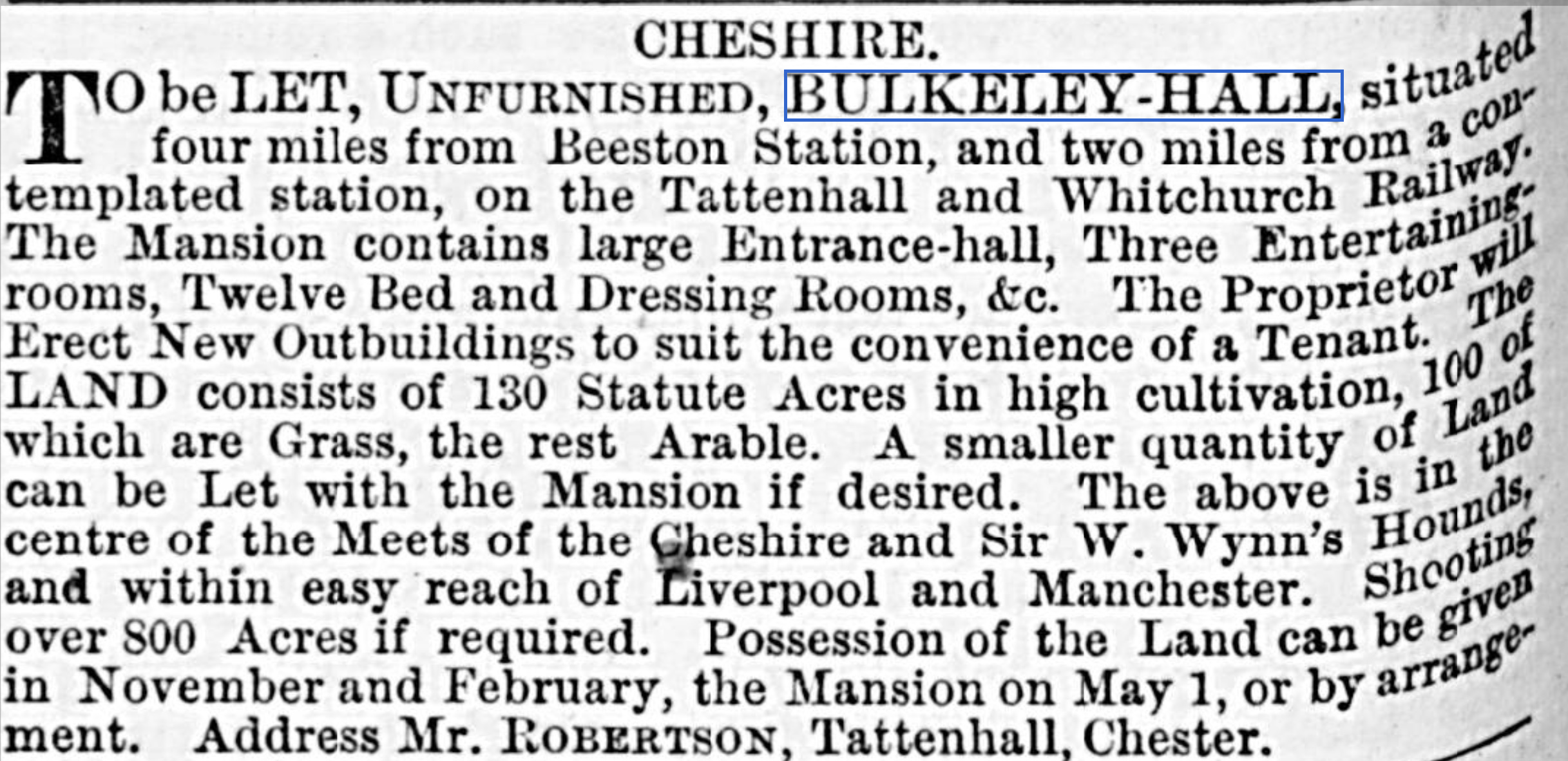
Rental notice for Bulkeley Hall in 1867.

Robert Barbour (1797-1885) was a wealthy merchant from Manchester. He was born in Scotland but moved to Manchester at the age of 18 to work in a textile company. He later owned the firm with his brother and called it Robert Barbour and Brother. He was also a founder of the Manchester and Liverpool District Bank. In 1856 he bought the 2300 acre estate of Bolesworth Castle and in 1866 when the Orton family estate was for sale. He not only bought Bulkeley Hall but a large number of the other Orton properties.

By 1911 the Bulkeley Hall was owned by Istvan Basil Jarmay (1884-1946). He was the son of Sir John Jarmay a wealthy industrial chemist. In 1910 he married Hilda Lesley Burnet (1886-1932) who was the daughter of General Sir Charles John Burnett. Sir Charles lived with his daughter and son-in-law at Bulkeley Hall for the last few years of his life. The couple had one son John Leslie Jarmay (1913-1948). The family developed a notable herd of British Friesian cattle. Hilda died in 1932 and five years later Istvan married Constance Theodora Bayley (nee Ogbourne) (1884-1957) who was the widow of Commander James Bayley of Willaston Hall. Istvan died in 1946 and Constance continued to live at Bulkeley Hall until 1955.

It was then bought by Joseph Harold Scott (1907-1989) who was Chairman of Allied Bakeries Ltd and a Director of Associated British Food Ltd. In 1958 a magazine called the “Illustrated Sporting and Dramatic News” published a feature article with photos on the improvements that the Scott family made. In 1960 Bulkeley Hall was advertised for sale and was bought by the Kynnersley family. It was owned for a time by the Wilberforce family who went bankrupt and were forced to move from the property.

The property was also owned by the Harmsworth Family in the 90’s

== See also ==
- Grade II* listed buildings in Cheshire East
- Listed buildings in Bulkeley
