= Harthill, Cheshire =

Village in Cheshire, England

Coordinates: 53.092°N 2.745°W

Harthill
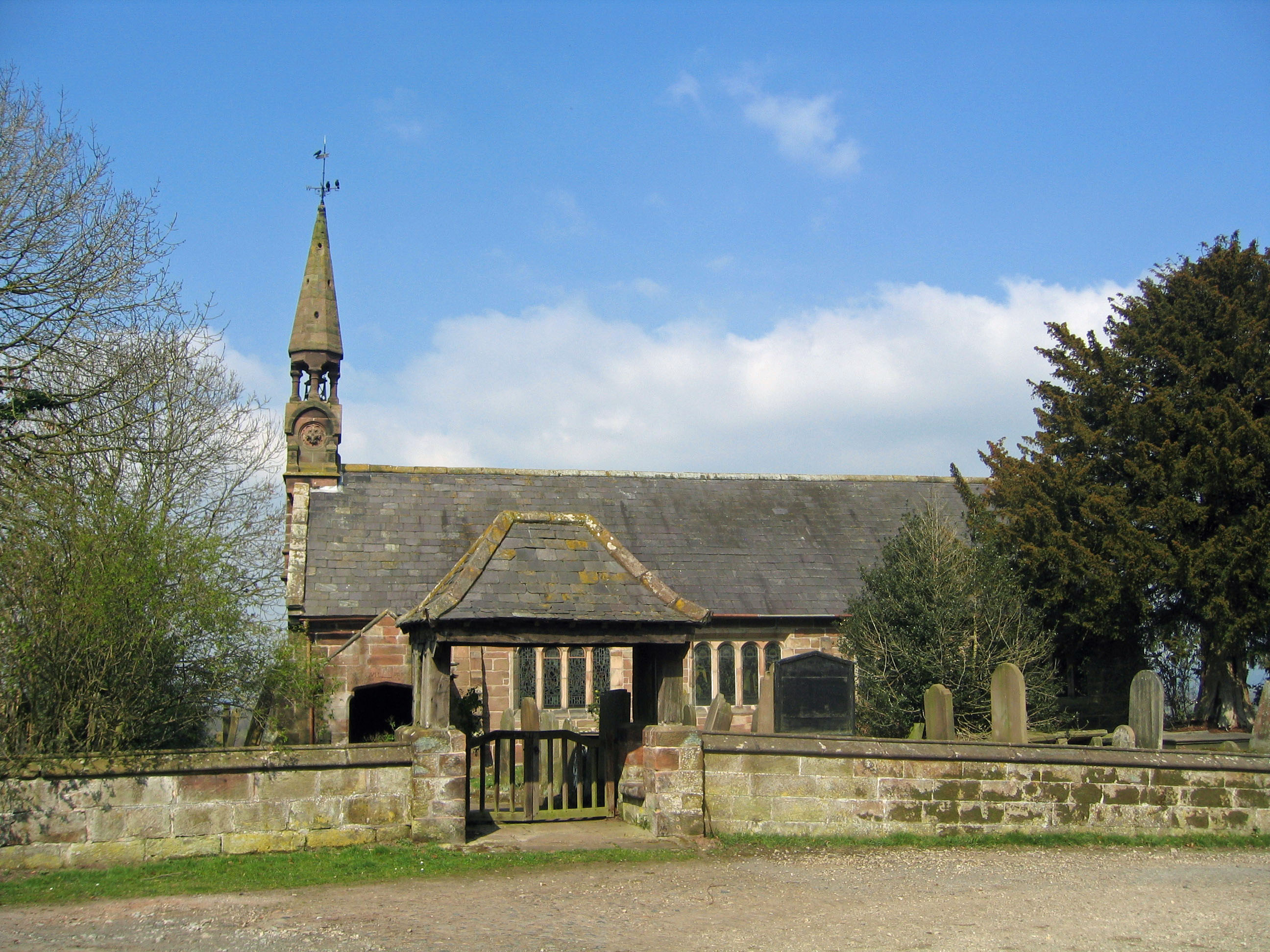
- All Saints Church, Harthill

- Location within Cheshire
- OS grid reference: SJ501552
- Civil parish: Harthill
- Unitary authority: Cheshire West and Chester
- Ceremonial county: Cheshire
- Region: North West
- Country: England
- Sovereign state: United Kingdom
- Post town: CHESTER
- Postcode district: CH3
- Dialling code: 01829
- Police: Cheshire
- Fire: Cheshire
- Ambulance: North West
- UK Parliament: Chester South and Eddisbury

Harthill is a village and civil parish in the unitary authority of Cheshire West and Chester and the ceremonial county of Cheshire, England.

All Saints Church, Harthill is a Grade II* listed building.

== See also ==
- Listed buildings in Harthill, Cheshire
