= Bulkeley Grange =

Coordinates: 53.08205°N 2.69593°W

Bulkeley Grange is a country house to the southeast of the village of Bulkeley, Cheshire, England. It replaced an earlier timber-framed house on the site, Bulkeley Old Hall, built by Thomas Brassey in about 1600. Bulkeley Grange was built in about 1865 by his successor and namesake, the railway contractor Thomas Brassey for his brother, Robert Brassey, as a model farm. The house is constructed in red brick with slate roofs in Jacobean style. Some half-timbering has been applied to the exterior. The entrance front is in two storeys and three bays with gables. It has a large, mainly stone, projecting porch with Jacobean-style pilasters and an openwork parapet. The house is recorded in the National Heritage List for England as a designated Grade II listed building.

== See also ==
- Listed buildings in Bulkeley
