= Bulkeley =

Village in Cheshire, England

Coordinates: 53.086°N 2.702°W

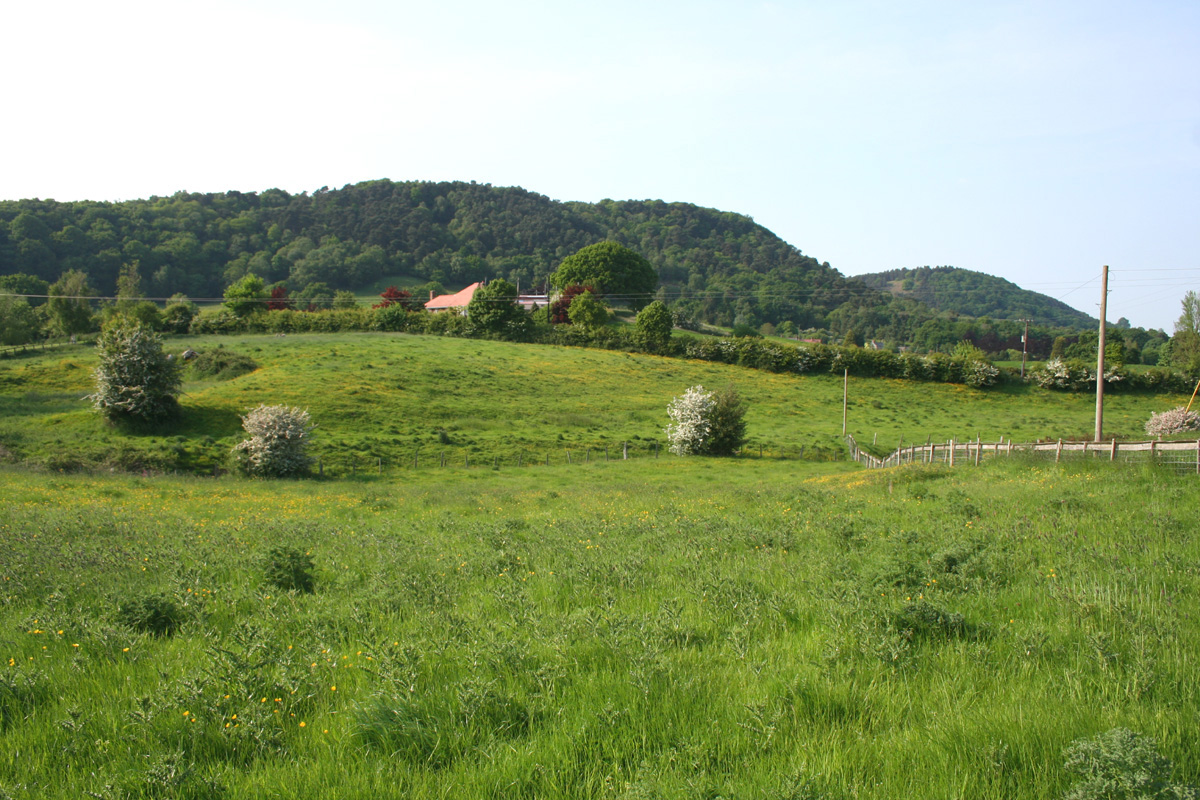
- Pasture at Bulkeley, showing Bulkeley Hill

- Location within Cheshire
- Population: 239 (2011 census)
- OS grid reference: SJ530545
- Civil parish: Bulkeley and Ridley
- Unitary authority: Cheshire East
- Ceremonial county: Cheshire
- Region: North West
- Country: England
- Sovereign state: United Kingdom
- Post town: MALPAS
- Postcode district: SY14
- Dialling code: 01829
- Police: Cheshire
- Fire: Cheshire
- Ambulance: North West
- UK Parliament: Chester South and Eddisbury

Bulkeley (/ˈbʊkli/) is a village and former civil parish, now in the parish of Bulkeley and Ridley, in the unitary authority area of Cheshire East and the ceremonial county of Cheshire, England. The village is on the A534 road, 9 miles (14 km) west of Nantwich. In the 2011 census it had a population of 239.

== History ==
The name was first recorded as Bulceleia in 1086, from Old English bulluc + leah, "pasture where bullocks graze".

Bulkeley was previously a township in Malpas parish, Broxton Hundred. It became a civil parish in 1866, which included the small settlement of Bulkeleyhay (also Bulkelehay or Bulkeley Hey) at SJ532534. Between 1894 and 1974 the civil parish was part of Nantwich Rural District. On 1 April 2023 the parish was abolished and merged with Ridley to form "Bulkeley and Ridley.".

== Governance ==
Bulkeley is administered jointly with Ridley by Bulkeley and Ridley Parish Council. From 1974 the civil parish was served by Crewe and Nantwich Borough Council, which was succeeded on 1 April 2009 by the new unitary authority of Cheshire East. Bulkeley falls in the parliamentary constituency of Chester South and Eddisbury which has been represented by Aphra Brandreth since 2024.

== Geography and economy ==
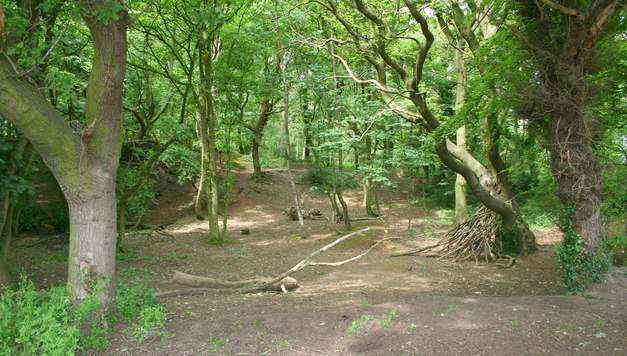
Woodland on Bulkeley Hill

Bulkeley Hill (SJ525552) forms the southern end of the Peckforton Hills. It is owned by the National Trust, and its wooded slopes include 12 acres (5 hectares) of semi-natural ancient woodland. The hill has been designated a county site of biological importance for its woodland and grassland habitats. A wider area covering the northern part of the civil parish has also been designated an Area of Special County Value. Another unnamed elevation of around 135 metres is located south west of Bulkeley village at SJ525540, and an unnamed brook runs east–west along the valley between it and Bulkeley Hill.

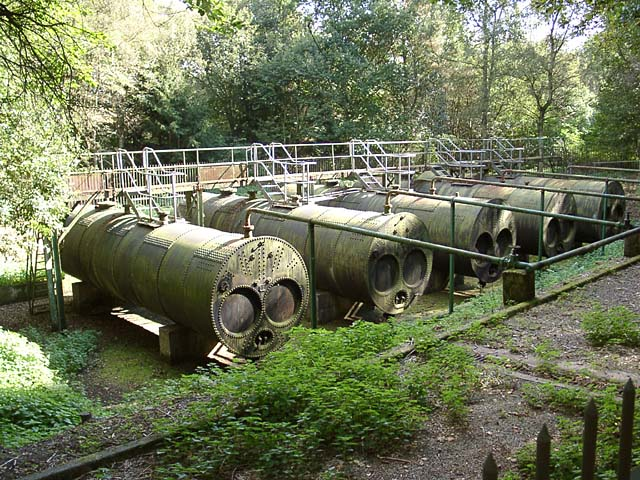
Waterworks, Bulkeley Hill

Two covered reservoirs are located on Bulkeley Hill (at SJ525550 and SJ528552), with a pumping station at the base (SJ529553); a disused inclined plane runs westwards from the pumping station. Formerly owned by Staffordshire Potteries Water Board, the facility is now operated by Severn Trent Water. A small wooded area of access land containing two ponds is located at SJ532545, immediately east of Bulkeley village and north of the A534, and there are several other meres and ponds scattered across the farmland.

The land use is predominantly agricultural, with cattle pasture, horse paddocks and some arable land.

== Demography ==
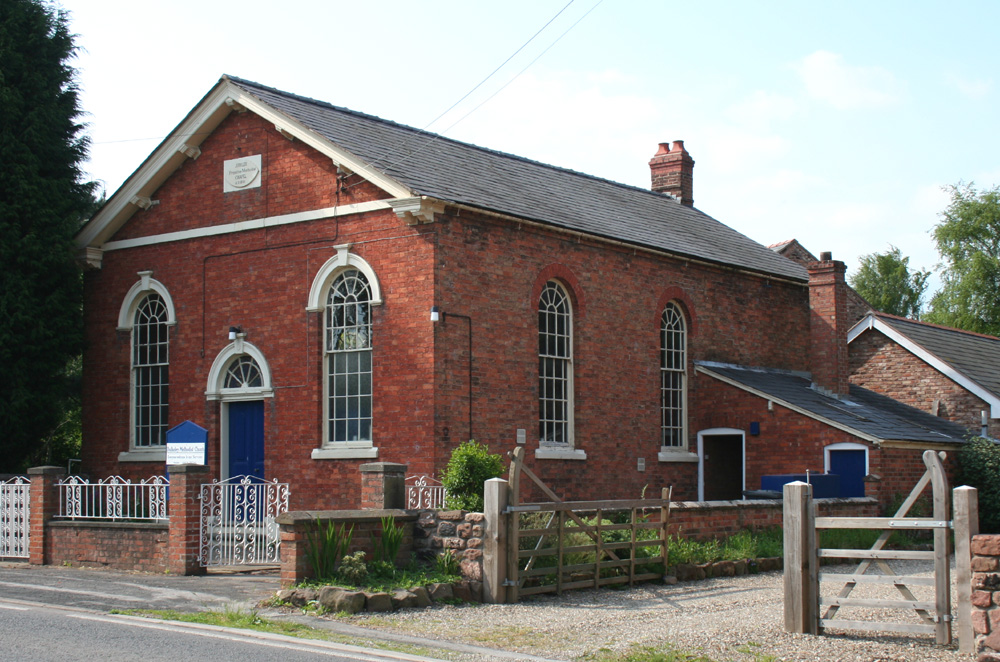
Bulkeley Methodist Chapel

According to the 2001 census the civil parish had a population of 240 in 106 households. The population at the 2011 census had reduced marginally to 239. These figures represent an increase from the 1951 population; the historical population figures were 184 (1801), 197 (1851), 168 (1901) and 146 (1951).

== Places of worship ==
Bulkeley Methodist Church is a red-brick chapel in Bulkeley village. Dating from 1861, it was formerly the Jubilee Primitive Methodist Chapel and is listed at grade II.

== Other landmarks ==
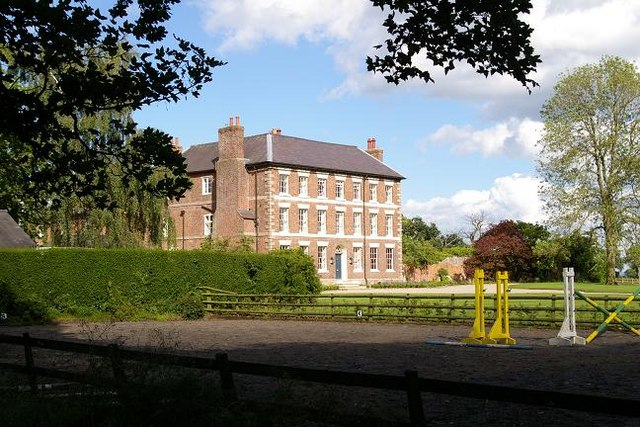
Bulkeley Hall

Bulkeley Hall (SJ523537) is a three-storey mansion in brown brick which dates from the mid-18th century; it is grade II* listed. Springfield Cottage (SJ528541) is a timber-framed cottage dating from the late 17th century. A former corn mill stands on Mill Lane (SJ530549) to the north of Bulkeley village.

Bulkeley Grange (SJ534541) is a grade-II-listed Victorian red-brick mansion in Jacobean style; the house was rebuilt by railway builder, Thomas Brassey, in 1843. A monument consisting of four inscribed sandstone pillars connected by iron straps was erected around an oak tree near The Grange in 1845, to commemorate Brassey's fortieth birthday. In 2007, it was moved to a location just to the east of Bulkeley village, adjacent to the A534 (SJ532544); the site has an interpretative sign.

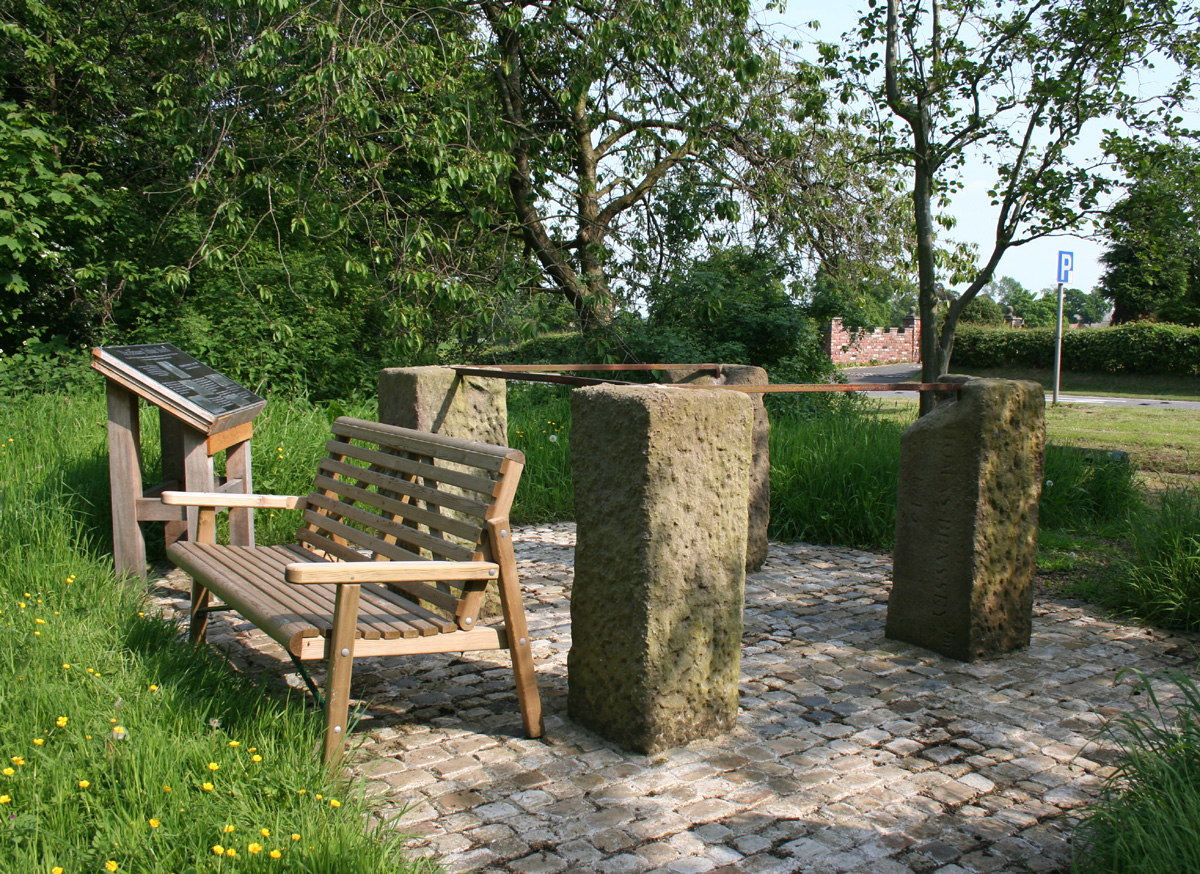
Brassey Tribute Stones

== Transport ==
The A534 (Wrexham Road) between Nantwich and Wrexham runs east–west across the civil parish. Other through routes include Stone House Lane, which runs from the A534 to Peckforton. Mill Lane connects Stone House Lane with the A534 and Cholmondeley Lane runs south to Bulkelehay. The Sandstone Trail long-distance footpath runs over Bulkeley Hill.

== Education ==
Bulkeley civil parish falls within the catchment areas of Bickerton Holy Trinity CE Primary School in Bickerton and Bishop Heber High School in Malpas.

== See also ==
- Listed buildings in Bulkeley
