= Bulkeley Methodist Church =

Coordinates: 53.0857°N 2.7005°W

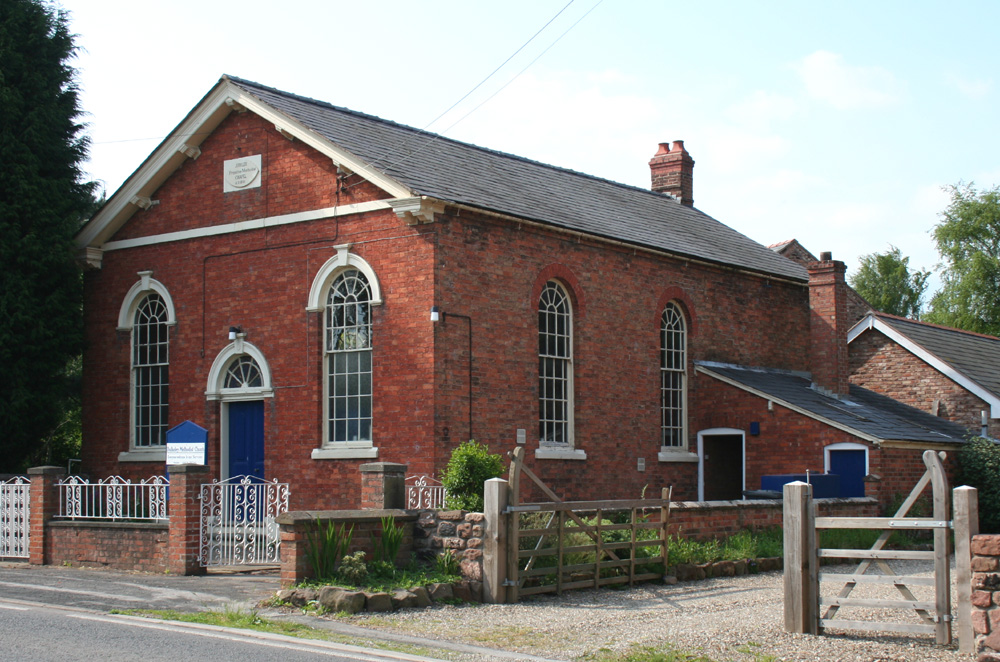
- Bulkeley Methodist Church from the southeast

- Location in Cheshire
- OS grid reference: SJ 532 545
- Location: Wrexham Road, Bulkeley, Cheshire
- Country: England
- Denomination: Methodist

Architecture
- Heritage designation: Grade II
- Designated: 29 October 1984
- Style: Georgian

Specifications
- Materials: Brick, slate roofs

Bulkeley Methodist Church is in Wrexham Road in the village of Bulkeley, Cheshire, England. It is recorded in the National Heritage List for England as a designated Grade II listed building.

== History ==
The church is dated 1861. It was originally called the Jubilee Primitive Methodist Chapel.

== Architecture ==
The building is constructed in red brick on a stone plinth with a slate roof. Despite its date, the architectural style is Georgian. It has a rectangular plan in two bays orientated north–south. The entrance is on the south side and contains a doorcase above which is a fanlight. This is flanked by round-headed sash windows. Above these is a pediment containing a panel with the original name of the church and its date. There are similar sash windows along the sides of the church. Inside the church is a reredos containing a three-arched arcade. The pulpit is hexagonal. The listing describes it as "an intact and pleasing example of a small chapel of the date". This is being purchased and converted into a domestic dwelling.

== See also ==
- Listed buildings in Bulkeley
