= All Saints Church, Harthill =

Coordinates: 53.0925°N 2.7470°W

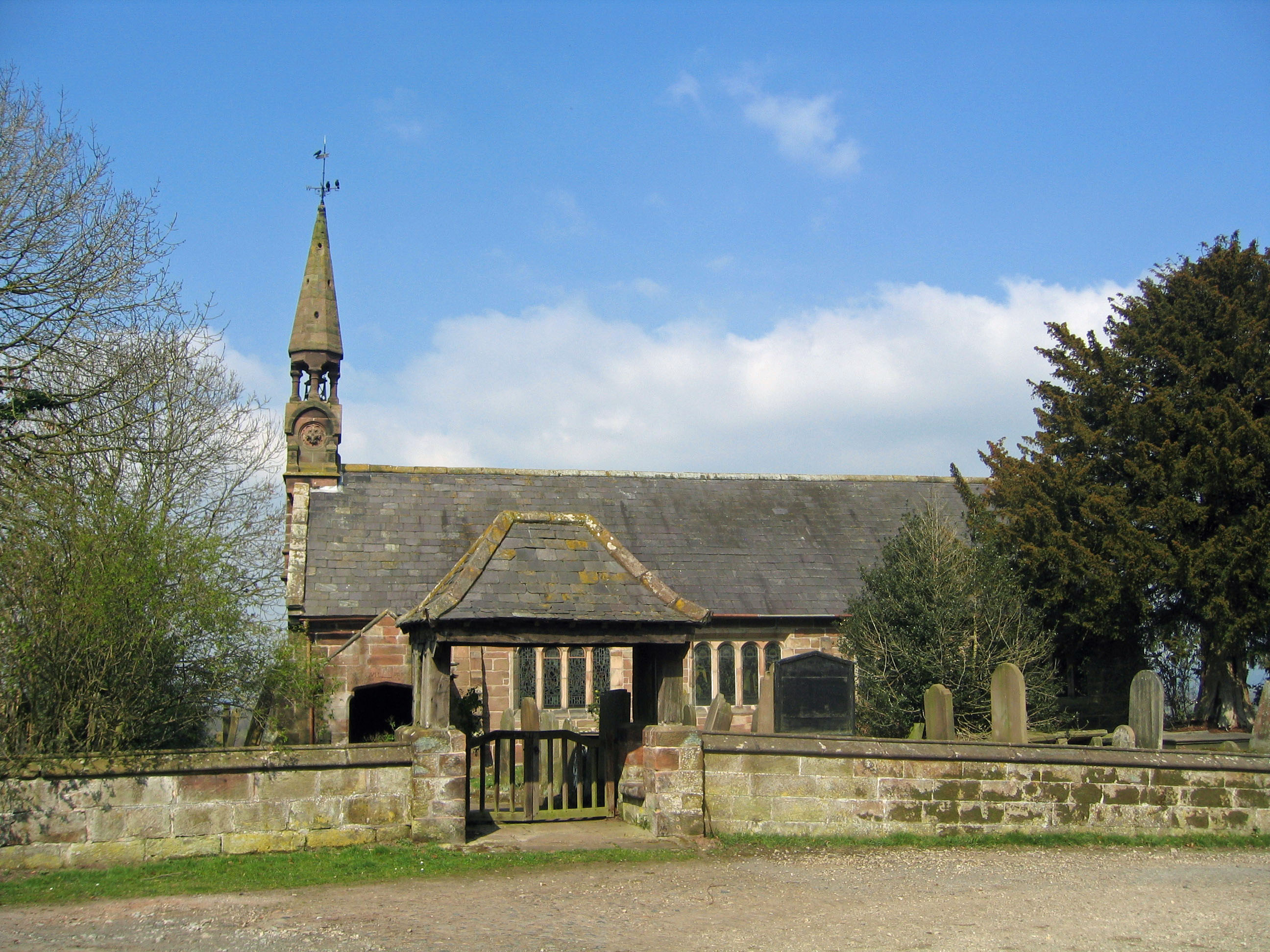
- The former All Saints Church, Harthill, from the south

- Location in Cheshire
- OS grid reference: SJ 500 552
- Location: Harthill, Cheshire
- Country: England
- Denomination: Anglican

Architecture
- Functional status: Redundant
- Heritage designation: Grade II*
- Designated: 1 March 1967
- Architectural type: Church
- Groundbreaking: 1609
- Completed: 1863

Specifications
- Length: 65 feet (20 m)
- Width: 24 feet (7 m)
- Materials: Ashlar red and buff sandstone Welsh slate roof with stone ridge

All Saints Church is a redundant Anglican church in the village of Harthill, Cheshire, England. It is recorded in the National Heritage List for England as a designated Grade II* listed building. As of 2010 the church is being converted into a community facility for the village and locality.

== History ==
A chapel on this site is first mentioned in 1280. It is likely that this earlier church was timber-framed. The present church was built in 1609. Restoration was carried out in 1862–63, and at this time a vestry was added to the north side and a larger belfry was erected.

== Architecture ==
The church is built in ashlar red and buff sandstone with a Welsh slate roof and a stone ridge. The five-bay nave and chancel are in one range, and there is a south porch and a north vestry. Inside the church is a hammerbeam roof. The windows are square-headed, those on the sides having four lights, while the east window has six lights with a transom. The porch contains churchwardens' inscriptions date 1611 and 1775. Inside the church is the framework of a screen bearing the date 1609. The stained glass includes the east window dating from 1885 to 1887, which was designed by Carl Almquist and made by Shrigley and Hunt. A north window in the chancel, dated 1908, is by Mary Lowndes.

== External features ==
In the churchyard to the east of the former church is a mausoleum dated 1885 which is constructed in ashlar buff sandstone with granite dressings. It is rectangular in plan with a stepped hipped cap surmounted by a slab with a cross upon it. On the long sides are six short pilasters and on the short sides four pilasters. The side panels are inscribed with memorials to members of the Barbour family of Bolesworth Castle. Also in the churchyard is a sandstone cross from the 11th or 12th century, and a sundial dated 1778 consisting of a sandstone column on an old millstone. All these structures are listed at Grade II. North of the church are two war graves of soldiers of World War I.

== See also ==
- Listed buildings in Harthill, Cheshire
