= Peckforton Hills =

Sandstone ridge in Cheshire, England

Coordinates: 53.1°N 2.7°W

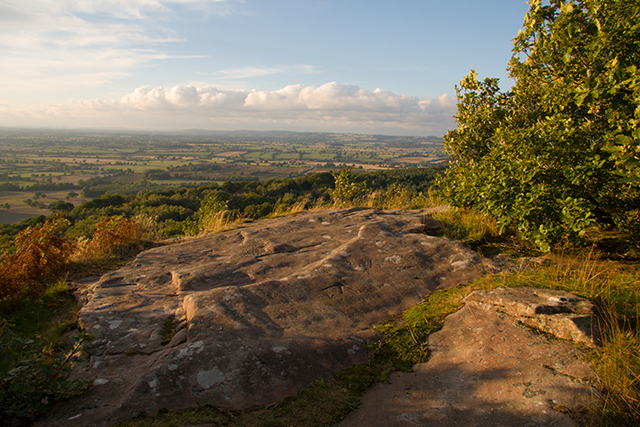
View from Stanner Nab on the Peckforton ridge

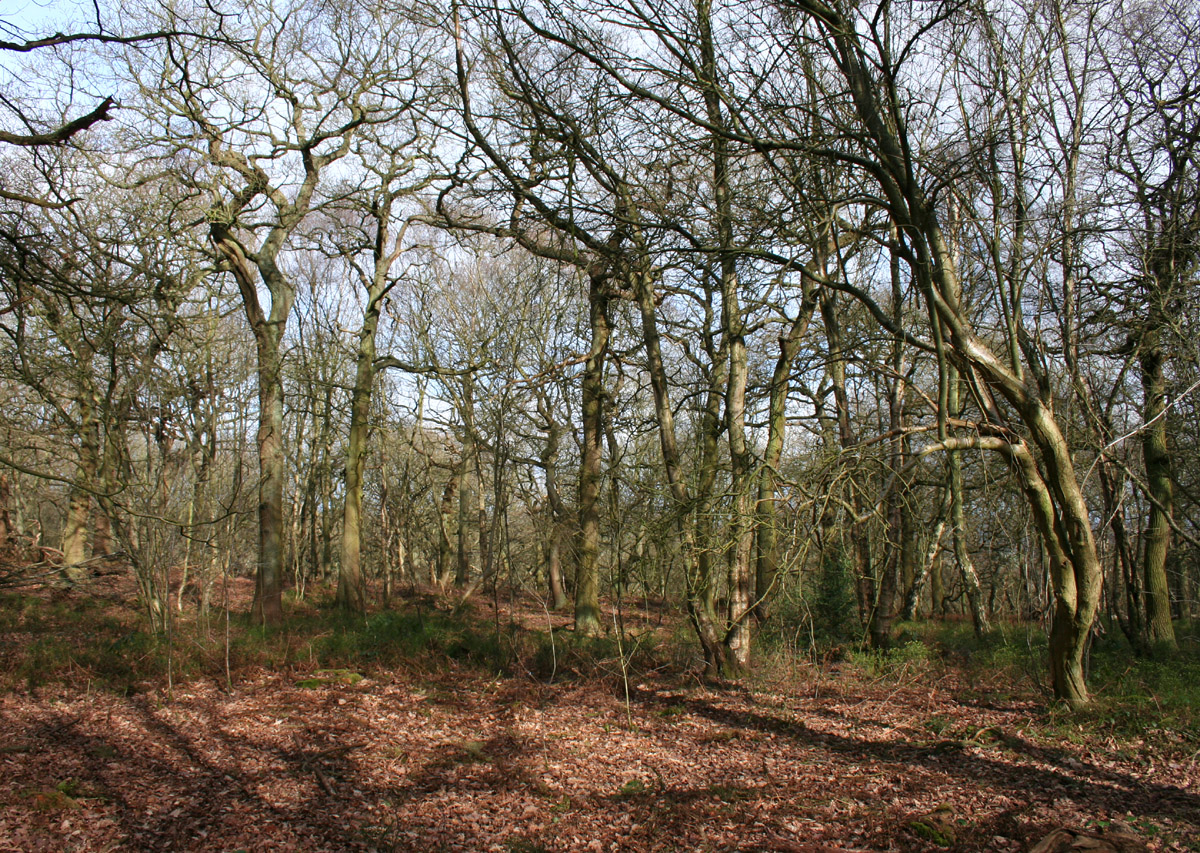
Woodland on Stanner Nab

The Peckforton Hills are a sandstone ridge running broadly northeast–southwest in the west of the English county of Cheshire. They form a significant part of the longer Mid Cheshire Ridge which extends southwards from Frodsham towards Malpas.

Bulkeley Hill (grid reference SJ525552) stands at the south end, and the ridge is continued southwards by Bickerton Hill. The high points are Peckforton Point (SJ529557; 203 m), immediately north of Bulkeley Hill (224m), and Stanner Nab (SJ531573; 200 m), towards the northern end of the ridge.

Settlements around the hills include Burwardsley to the west, Beeston to the north, Peckforton and Bunbury to the east and Bulkeley to the south. On Ascension Day the parishioners of St Boniface, Bunbury walk to the 200m summit of Stanner Nab for a service as the sun sets.

== Geology ==
The Peckforton Hills are formed from layers of sedimentary rock, namely sandstones of Triassic age and collectively known as the New Red Sandstone. At around 250 million years old, the oldest (and hence lowermost) strata are now known as the Wilmslow Sandstone Formation though formerly as the Upper Mottled Sandstone. This formation is overlain by sandstones of the Helsby Sandstone Formation which are around 245 million years old. The strata are sub-horizontal, dipping generally to the east by a few degrees. Nearby Beeston Castle hill, effectively an outlier of the range with similar geology, is topped by a small outcrop of the Tarporley Siltstone Formation (formerly known as the Keuper Waterstones). The area was affected by the passage of the Irish Sea Icesheet southward through Cheshire during the last ice age. Several glacial meltwater channels are identified in and around the hills, especially to the west and including Peckforton Gap.

== Features ==
The Sandstone Trail long-distance footpath runs along the ridge, and the hills are the source of both the River Weaver and the River Gowy. A 143.0-acre (57.88 ha) of Peckforton Woods has been designated a Site of Special Scientific Interest. Bulkeley Hill is owned by the National Trust, and its wooded slopes include 12 acres (5 hectares) of semi-natural ancient woodland. Peckforton and Bulkeley Hills have also both been designated county sites of biological importance for their woodland and grassland habitats.

Peckforton Castle, a Victorian mansion built in the style of a medieval castle, stands at the northern end of the Peckforton ridge.
