= River Gowy =

Tributary of the River Mersey in Cheshire, England

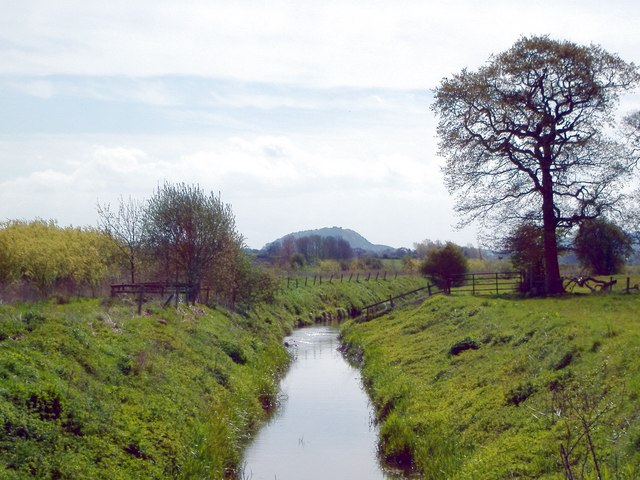
- The River Gowy at Foulk Stapleford

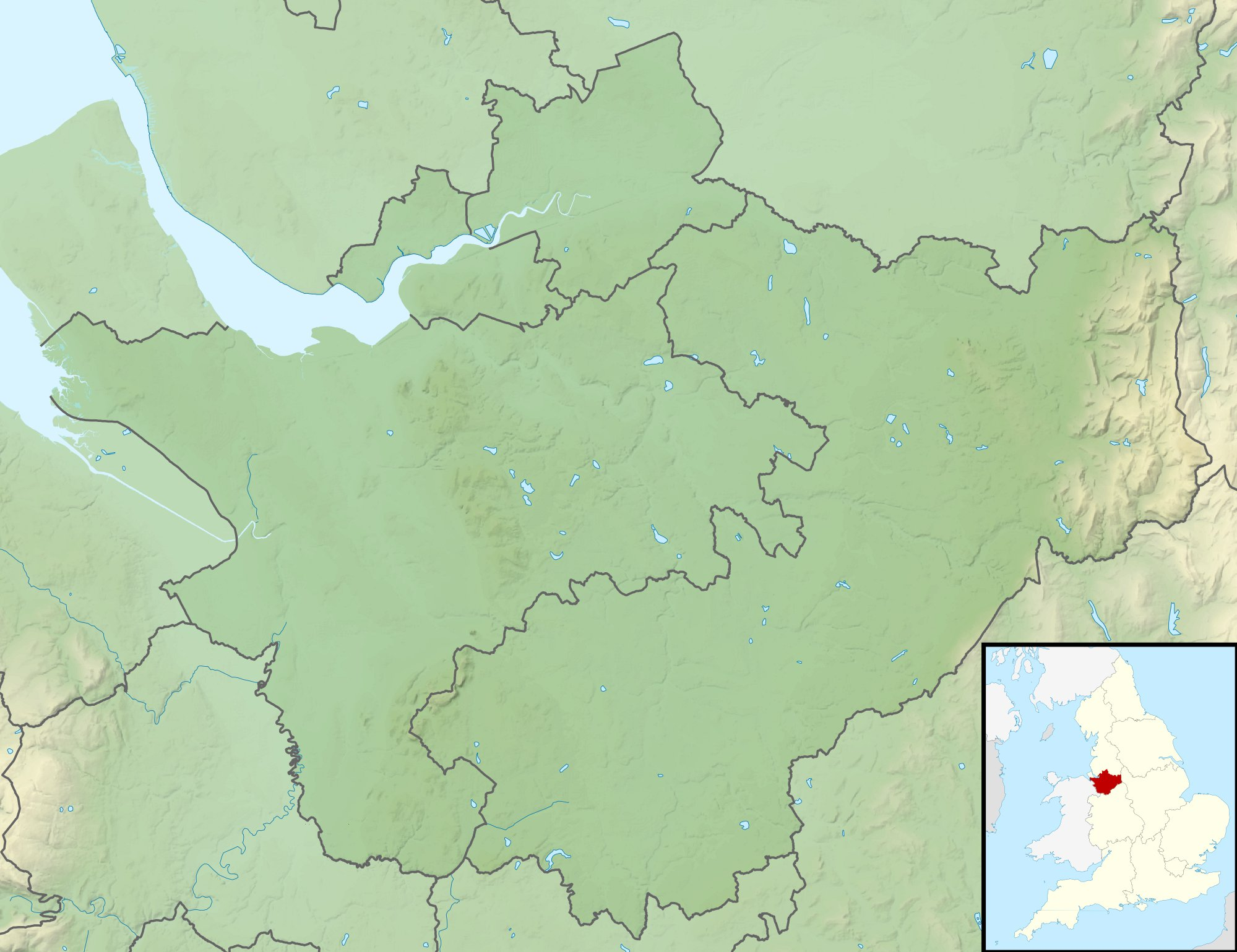
- Location of the mouth within Cheshire

Location
- Country: England
- County: Cheshire
- District: Cheshire West and Chester

Physical characteristics
- Source
  - location: near Peckforton
  - coordinates: 53.0988°N 2.6838°W
- Mouth
  - location: confluence with River Mersey, Stanlow Refinery
  - coordinates: 53.2914°N 2.8521°W
- Length: 32 km (20 mi)

The River Gowy is a river in Cheshire, England, a tributary of the River Mersey.

It rises in western Cheshire in the hills near Peckforton Castle, very close to the source of the River Weaver. While the Weaver flows south initially, the Gowy flows north and for several miles provides the valley used by the Shropshire Union Canal. It runs just to the east of Chester and passes through a syphon under the Manchester Ship Canal to meet the Mersey near Stanlow. Its total length is around 20 miles (32 km).

Perennially popular with fishermen and home to several rare invertebrates, it has been polluted in its lower reaches in recent decades, due in part to the oil refinery at Stanlow and the arrival of the nearby M53 and M56 motorways, leading to schemes by environmental groups to clean up the area and to restock the fish population.

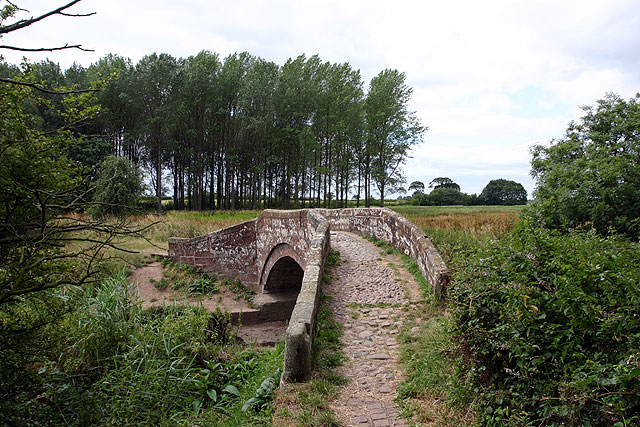
One of the 'Roman' bridges at Hockenhull Platts

The Gowy Meadows Nature Reserve, founded in 2002 and stretching from the A5117 to the M56, is an area of river valley peat covered with wet grassland or grazing meadows. This area of 160 hectares (395 acres), owned by Shell UK, has been created as a nature reserve by Cheshire Wildlife Trust. Surveys by the Environment Agency show that the Gowy's eel population has held up well despite a massive Europe-wide decline in numbers. The reasons for this are unclear but local anglers suggest that eel in the river may not follow normal migration patterns because of the partially closed nature of the river flow caused by the system of syphoning under the ship canal.

At one time the river provided power for up to 20 watermills. Today only a few remain: Bates Mill and Walk Mill (both in private ownership), Bunbury Mill (now owned by a Trust) and Trafford Mill. The latter is owned by United Utilities plc. Bunbury Mill is open to the public at times. Trafford Mill is being developed as a museum and an educational and training resource concentrating on conservation-related activities.

The river's length has been increased over the centuries as land has been reclaimed by draining the marshes. It was on the marshes at Gibbet’s Field near Mickle Trafford that James Brown and Thomas Price were hanged in January 1795 for the abduction and robbery of a mail boy.

== Tributaries ==
- Thornton Brook
- Mill Brook
- Back Brook
- Barrow Brook
- Milton Brook
- Waterless Brook
- Southley Brook
- Crimes Brook
