= Peckforton =

Civil parish in Cheshire, England

Coordinates: 53.102952°N 2.689385°W

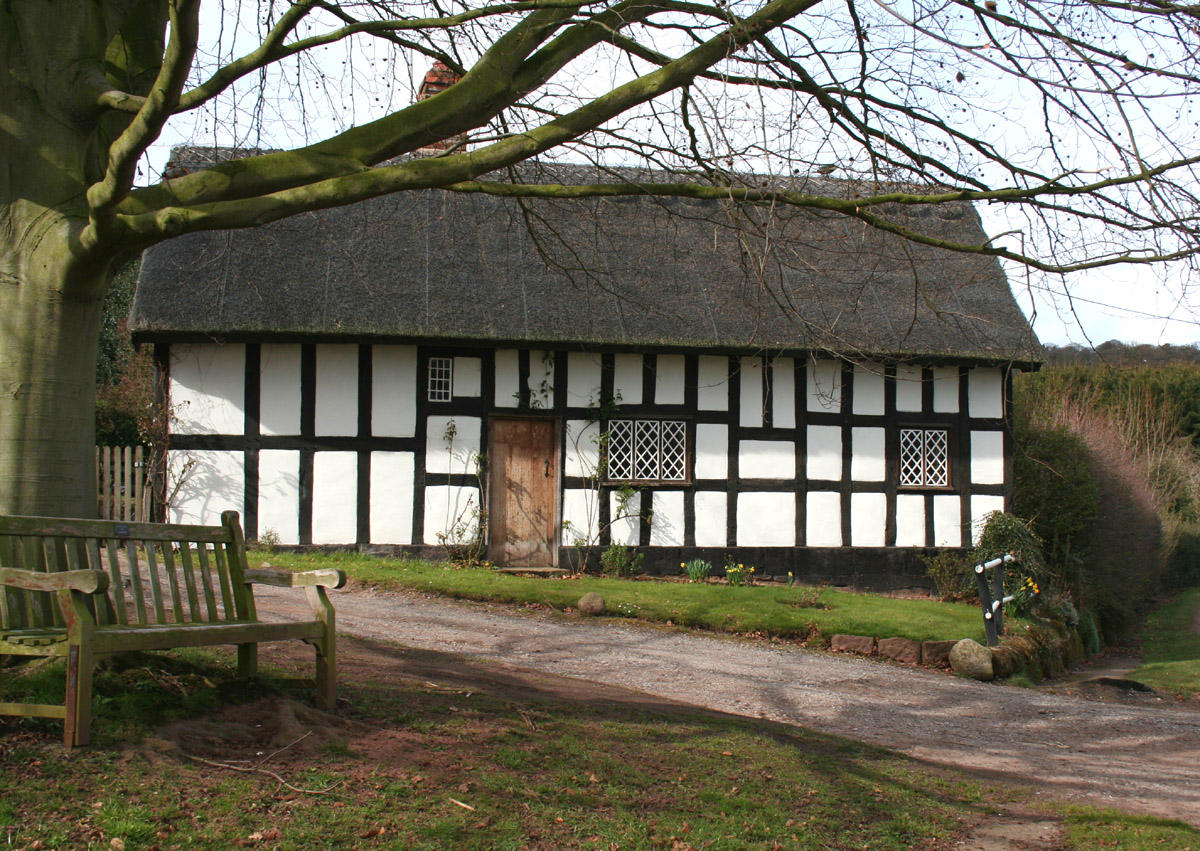
- Black and White Cottage, in Peckforton village centre

- Location within Cheshire
- Population: 269 (including Ridley, 2011)
- OS grid reference: SJ538564
- Civil parish: Peckforton
- Unitary authority: Cheshire East
- Ceremonial county: Cheshire
- Region: North West
- Country: England
- Sovereign state: United Kingdom
- Post town: TARPORLEY
- Postcode district: CW6
- Dialling code: 01270
- UK Parliament: Chester South and Eddisbury

Peckforton (/ˈpɛkfərtən/ PEK-fər-tən) is a scattered settlement (centred at SJ538564) and civil parish in the unitary authority of Cheshire East and the ceremonial county of Cheshire, England. The settlement is located 6.5 miles (10.5 km) to the north east of Malpas and 7.5 miles (12.1 km) to the west of Nantwich. The civil parish covers 1,754 acres (710 ha), with an estimated total population of 150 in 2006. The area is predominantly agricultural. Nearby villages include Bulkeley to the south, Beeston to the north, Higher Burwardsley to the west, Spurstow to the east and Bunbury to the north east.

The Peckforton Hills form the western part of the civil parish with high points at Peckforton Point (203 metres) and Stanner Nab (200 metres). They are the source of the Weaver and Gowy rivers. Part of Peckforton Woods, largely planted in 1922, form a Site of Special Scientific Interest. The hills have been quarried since the Roman era. Peckforton appears in the Domesday Book survey of 1086. The earliest surviving buildings date from the early 17th century.

Peckforton and the adjacent Beeston were part of an estate purchased by John Tollemache, Lord Tollemache in 1840. He had Peckforton Castle – a Victorian mansion designed by Anthony Salvin in imitation of a medieval castle – built at the northern end of the Peckforton ridge. Many of the local buildings were constructed for Lord Tollemache using brick in the 1860s and 1870s as part of the Peckforton Estate.

== History ==
The Peckforton Hills were quarried during the Roman era. Peckforton appears in the Domesday Book survey of 1086, when it was held by Wulfric (possibly Wulfric Spot). The survey lists land for two ploughs. Peckforton fell in the ancient parish of Bunbury in the Eddisbury Hundred.

Peckforton and the adjacent civil parish of Beeston were part of an estate purchased by John Tollemache, 1st Baron Tollemache, in 1840. Lord Tollemache built Peckforton Castle in 1844–50. Praised as a model landlord, he had over fifty farms and many cottages built on his Cheshire estate, at a cost of around £280,000. Labourers were encouraged to rent 3 acres (1.2 ha) of land to farm to supplement their income. The woods that surround the castle were largely planted in 1922. In 2008, the Tollemache family remained the major landowners in Peckforton, although the castle itself was sold in 1989.

== Governance ==
Peckforton has a parish meeting rather than a parish council. From 1974 the civil parish was served by Crewe and Nantwich Borough Council, which was succeeded on 1 April 2009 by the unitary authority of Cheshire East. Since 2024 Peckforton has been within the parliamentary constituency of Chester South and Eddisbury which is represented by Aphra Brandreth.

== Geography and transport ==
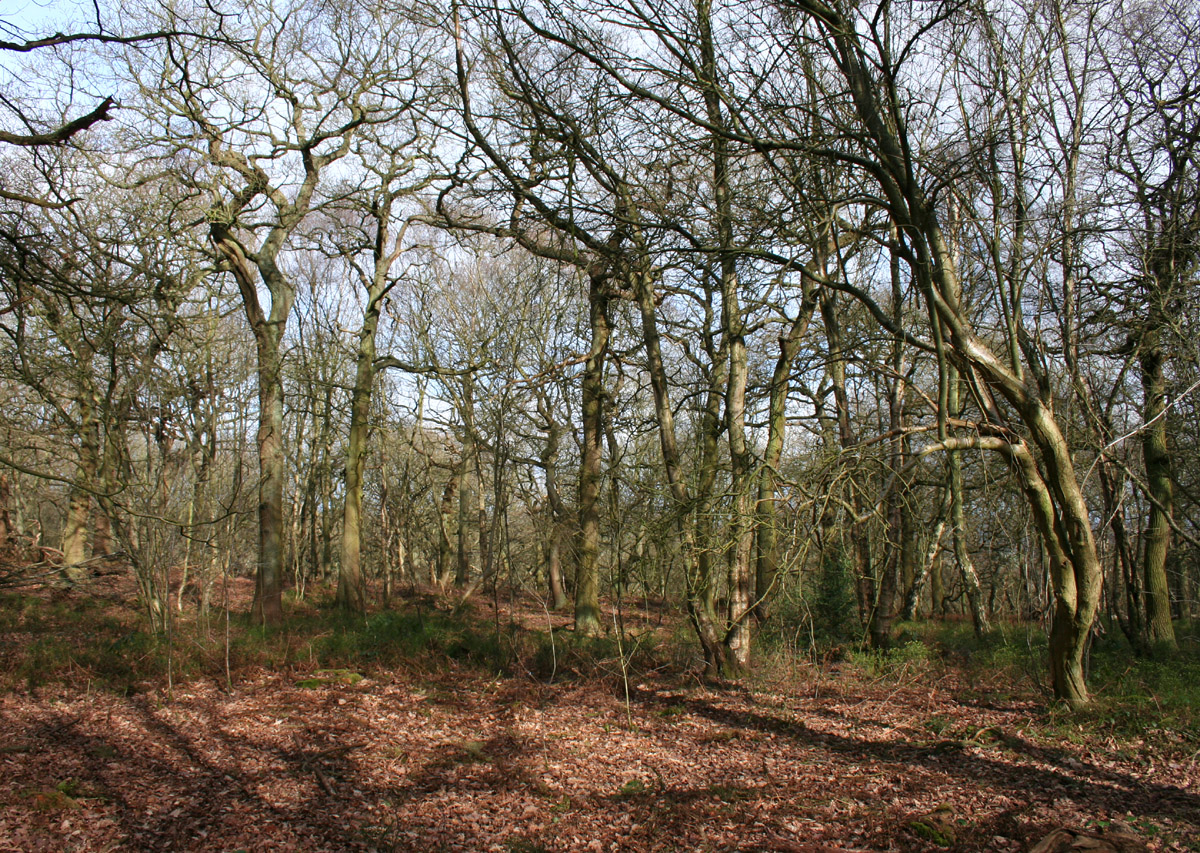
Peckforton Woods on Stanner Nab

The civil parish has a total area of 1,754 acres (710 ha). The sandstone ridge of the Peckforton Hills runs broadly north–south in the west of the civil parish, with high points at Peckforton Point (SJ529557; 203 metres) and Stanner Nab (SJ531573; 200 metres). A 57.88 hectares area of Peckforton Woods has been designated a Site of Special Scientific Interest, and the hills have also been designated county sites of biological importance for their woodland and grassland habitats. The Peckforton Hills are the source of the Weaver and the Gowy rivers; the Weaver flows southwards through the parish, while the Gowy flows northwards.

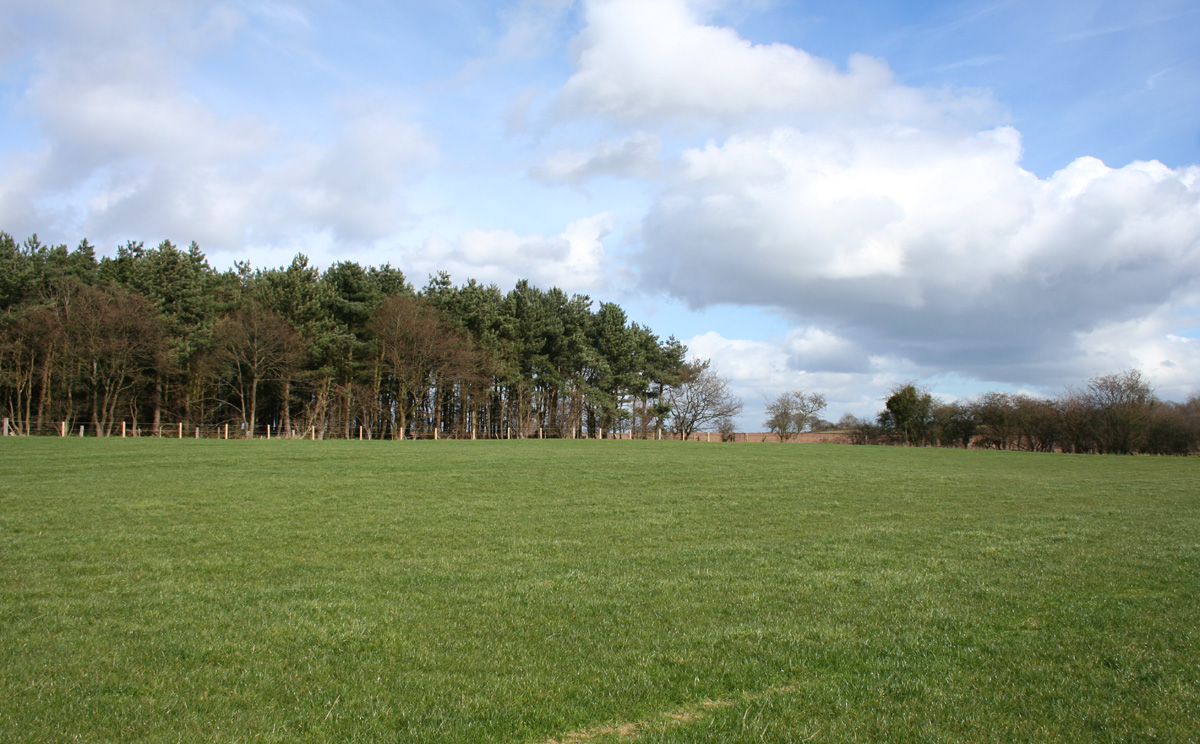
Farmland by Peckforton Moss

To the east of Stone House Lane, the land is gently undulating with an elevation mainly within the range of 75–100 metres. The land use in this part of the civil parish is agricultural, predominantly pasture with some arable land. This area also includes the woodland and plantations of Peckforton Moss (SJ542559), Peckforton Wood (SJ554560), Brickkiln Wood (SJ544574) and part of Willis's Wood (SJ542580), as well as Peckforton Mere (SJ541576) and many smaller ponds and meres.

The A49 forms part of the eastern boundary of the civil parish. Stone House Lane runs north–south through the parish, with Peckforton Hall Lane running eastwards from it. The Sandstone Trail long-distance footpath runs along the Peckforton ridge.

== Demography ==
In 2006, the total population of the civil parish was estimated as 150. The 2001 census recorded a population of 116 in 52 households. This represents a decline from historical population figures, which were 260 (1801), 286 (1851), 176 (1901) and 140 (1951).

== Peckforton Castle ==
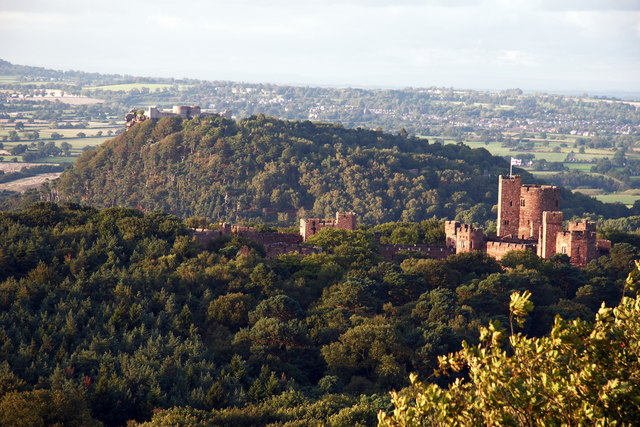
Peckforton and Beeston Castles from Stanner Nab

At the northern end of the Peckforton ridge stands the grade-I-listed Peckforton Castle (SJ533580), a Victorian replica of a medieval castle designed by Anthony Salvin in 1844–50 for John Tollemache. Built around a walled courtyard with battlements and towers, the castle stands opposite the genuinely medieval Beeston Castle, and is surrounded by a dry moat. George Gilbert Scott called it "the very height of masquerading". Not used as a residence since the Second World War, the castle has been used as a film and television location, and as a venue for civil weddings and live-action fantasy role playing. The castle was sold in 1989, and subsequently converted into an hotel.

Also by Salvin are the castle's small private chapel and the gatehouse on Stone House Lane. Both, like the castle, are in rock-faced stone. The gatehouse consists of an archway and circular turret with a two-storey lodge attached. Both buildings are listed at grade II*.

== Other landmarks ==
=== Elephant and castle carving ===
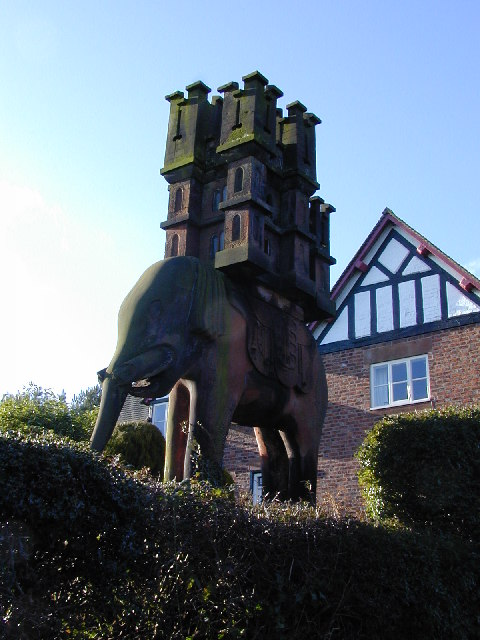
Elephant and castle carving

A red sandstone carving depicting an elephant bearing a castle stands in a garden on Stone House Lane in Peckforton village. It dates from around 1859 and is listed at grade II. It was carved by John or William Watson, a local stonemason then working on Peckforton Castle who also carved stone lions now at Spurstow and Tattenhall. The elephant and the castle are each carved from a single piece of stone, which derives from the same quarry as Peckforton Castle. The elephant has a tasselled saddle, supporting the castle which has three tiers, with a turreted gatehouse and a keep with turrets at the corner. Some of the castle windows are glazed.

The original purpose of the carving is unclear. The device formed part of the crest of the Worshipful Company of Cutlers and is often associated with public houses, but there has never been a pub called The Elephant and the Castle in Peckforton. An elephant also appears in the arms of the Corbett family, local landowners before 1626. According to one source, the carving was originally intended as a beehive, although there is no evidence it has ever been used as one.

=== Listed buildings ===
Peckforton has a diverse collection of listed buildings. Probably the earliest remaining buildings in the civil parish are Manor Farm Cottage and Yew Tree Cottage, grade-II-listed timber-framed cottages dating from the early 17th century. Black and White Cottage on Stone House Lane is a single-storey, timber-framed, thatched cottage dating from the late 17th century with an attached byre under the same roof; the cottage is listed at grade II* for its unusually well-preserved interior.

Other black-and-white cottages include Garden Cottage and Hillside Cottage in the village, and Hill Lane Cottage on Hill Lane. Rock Cottage is unusual in being constructed in sandstone, while Smithy Cottage is a timber-framed cottage infilled with a mixture of brick and sandstone. On Peckforton Gap in the south of the civil parish stands The Gap, another stone cottage. All date from the late 17th century and are listed at grade II.

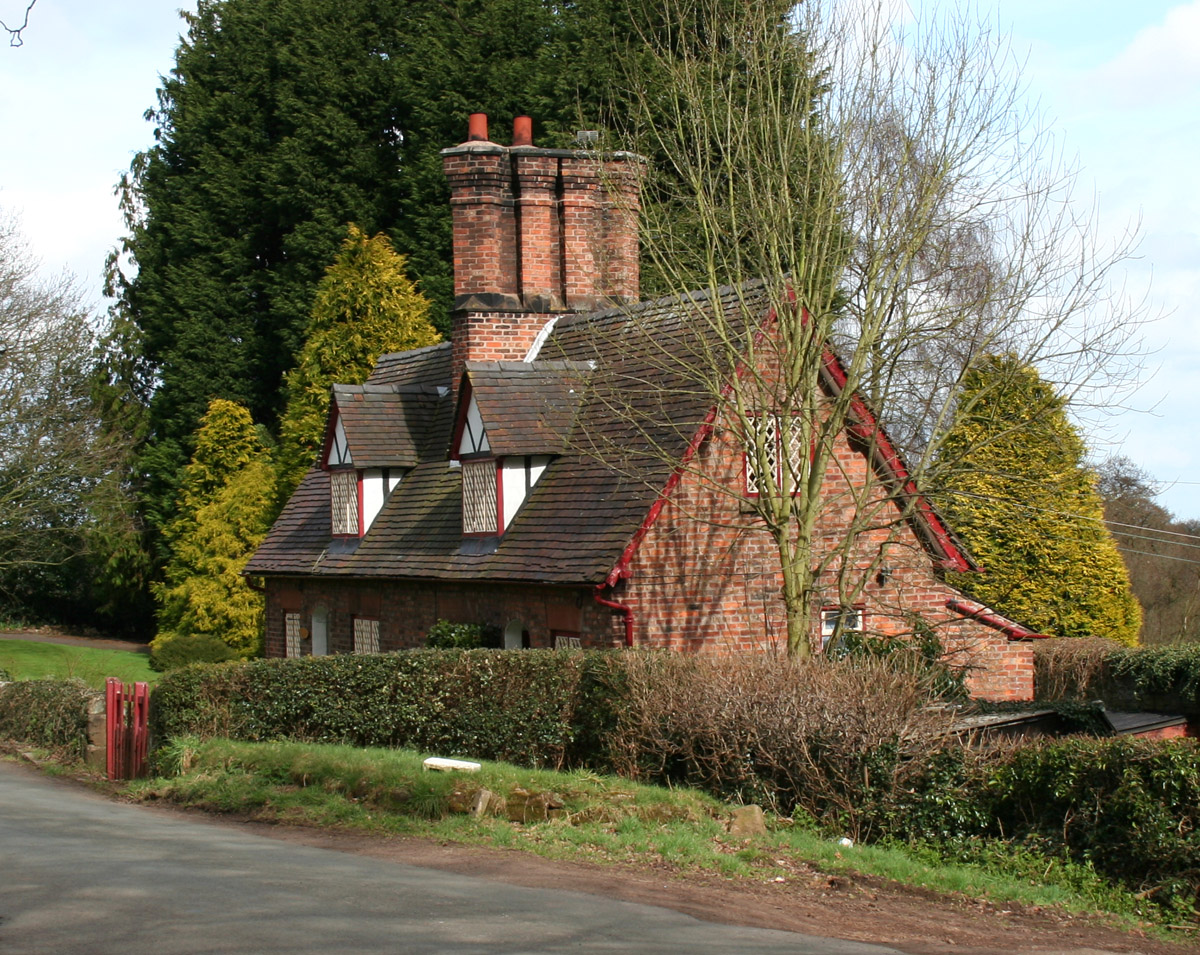
Fountain Cottages, part of the Peckforton Estate

To the east of the village on Peckforton Hall Lane stands Peckforton Hall (SJ545565), a grade-II*-listed farmhouse dating from the late 17th century. In red brick with a slate roof, the hall has twin gabled bays with a later ungabled wing. The nearby former farm building of the same date is timber-framed with a mixture of stone, brick and oak boarding; it is also listed at grade II.

Several former Peckforton Estate cottages, built for John Tollemache in around 1860, are listed at grade II. Constructed in red or brown brick, they typically have a single storey with an attic and feature lozenge windows and prominent chimney stacks. Examples include Fountain Cottages, Green Cottage and Mill Beck Cottage.

Manor Farm (SJ540564) stands on Peckforton Hall Lane at the east of the village and is typical of farmhouses built for the Peckforton Estate. The farmhouse dates from around 1870 and is in red brick with three bays, lozenge windows and timber studding to the gables. Both the farmhouse and the adjacent farm building of the same date are listed at grade II. Hillside Farm (SJ533556) on Stone House Lane south of the village is another former estate farm, also dating from 1870. The farm house and adjacent farm building are grade II listed.

== Education ==
There are no educational facilities within the civil parish. The parish falls within the catchment areas of Bunbury Aldersey Church of England Primary School in Bunbury and Tarporley High School in Tarporley.

== See also ==
- Listed buildings in Peckforton
