= Peckforton Castle =

Grade I listed English country house in Cheshire East, United Kingdom

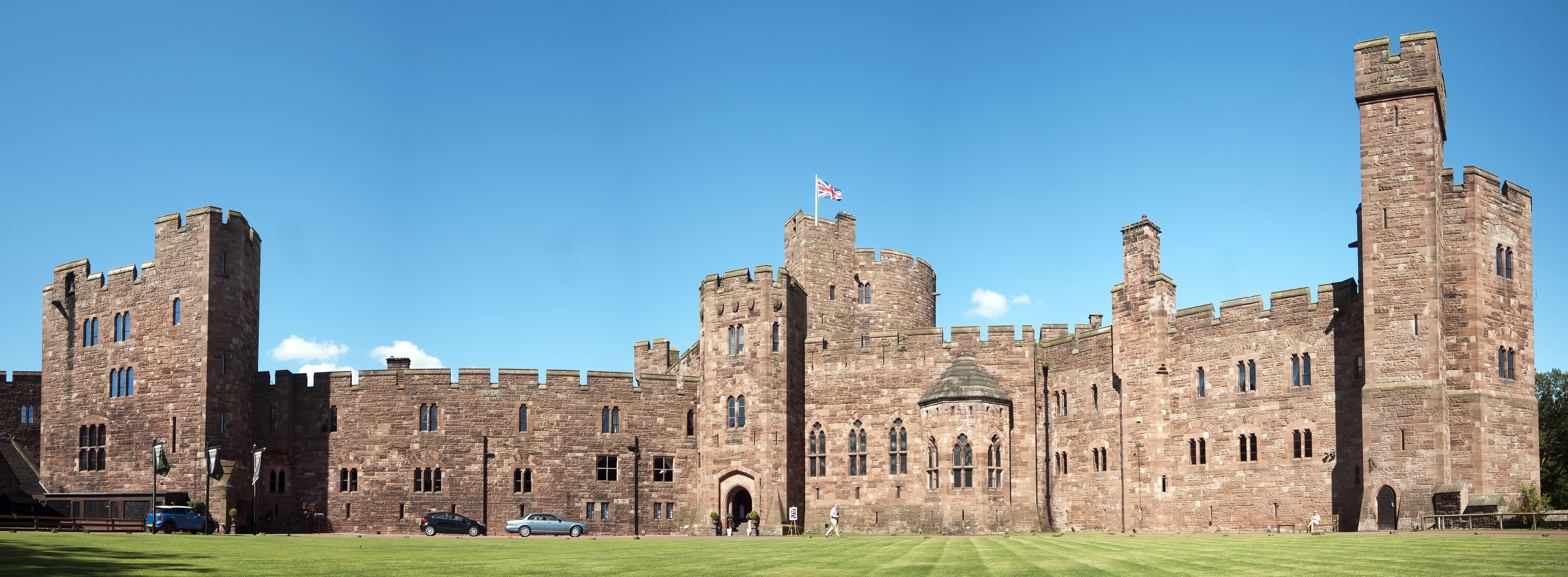
- Peckforton Castle from the courtyard

- Location in Cheshire
- 53.1175°N 2.6990°W
- Location: Peckforton, Cheshire, England
- OS grid reference: SJ 533 580

History
- Built: 1844–50
- Built for: John Tollemache, 1st Baron Tollemache

Site notes
- Elevation: 469.2 feet (143 m)
- Architect: Anthony Salvin
- Architectural style: Gothic Revival

Listed Building – Grade I
- Official name: Peckforton Castle
- Designated: 10 June 1952
- Reference no.: 1135729

Peckforton Castle is a Victorian country house built in the style of a medieval castle. It stands in woodland at the north end of Peckforton Hills one mile (2 km) northwest of the village of Peckforton, Cheshire, England. It is recorded in the National Heritage List for England as a designated Grade I listed building. The house was built in the middle of the 19th century as a family home for John Tollemache, a wealthy Cheshire landowner, estate manager, and member of parliament. It was designed by Anthony Salvin in the Gothic style. During the Second World War it was used as a hostel for physically disabled children.

The Tollemache family used the castle for occasional gatherings, but otherwise it was unused until 1969. From 1969 to 1980 the castle was leased by the 4th Lord Tollemache to an American, George W. Barrett, and it again became a private residence and closed to the public.

During the 1970s and 1980s it was used as a location for shooting films and television programmes. The castle was bought in 1988 by Evelyn Graybill, who converted it into a hotel. In 2006 it was purchased by the Naylor family, who expanded its use to include hosting weddings, conferences and other functions.

== Location ==
Peckforton Castle stands in a wooded area near the northern extremity of Peckforton Hills at an elevation of 469.2 feet (143 m). The land falls steeply downwards to the north and the west of the castle, and the Sandstone Trail, a long-distance footpath, runs along the base of these slopes. The ruins of Beeston Castle stand on a separate steeply sloping hill 0.75 miles (1 km) to the north. The village of Beeston is 0.75 miles (1 km) to the northeast and the village of Peckforton is 1 mile (2 km) to the southeast. Access is via the road between Beeston and Peckforton.

== History ==
=== Early history ===
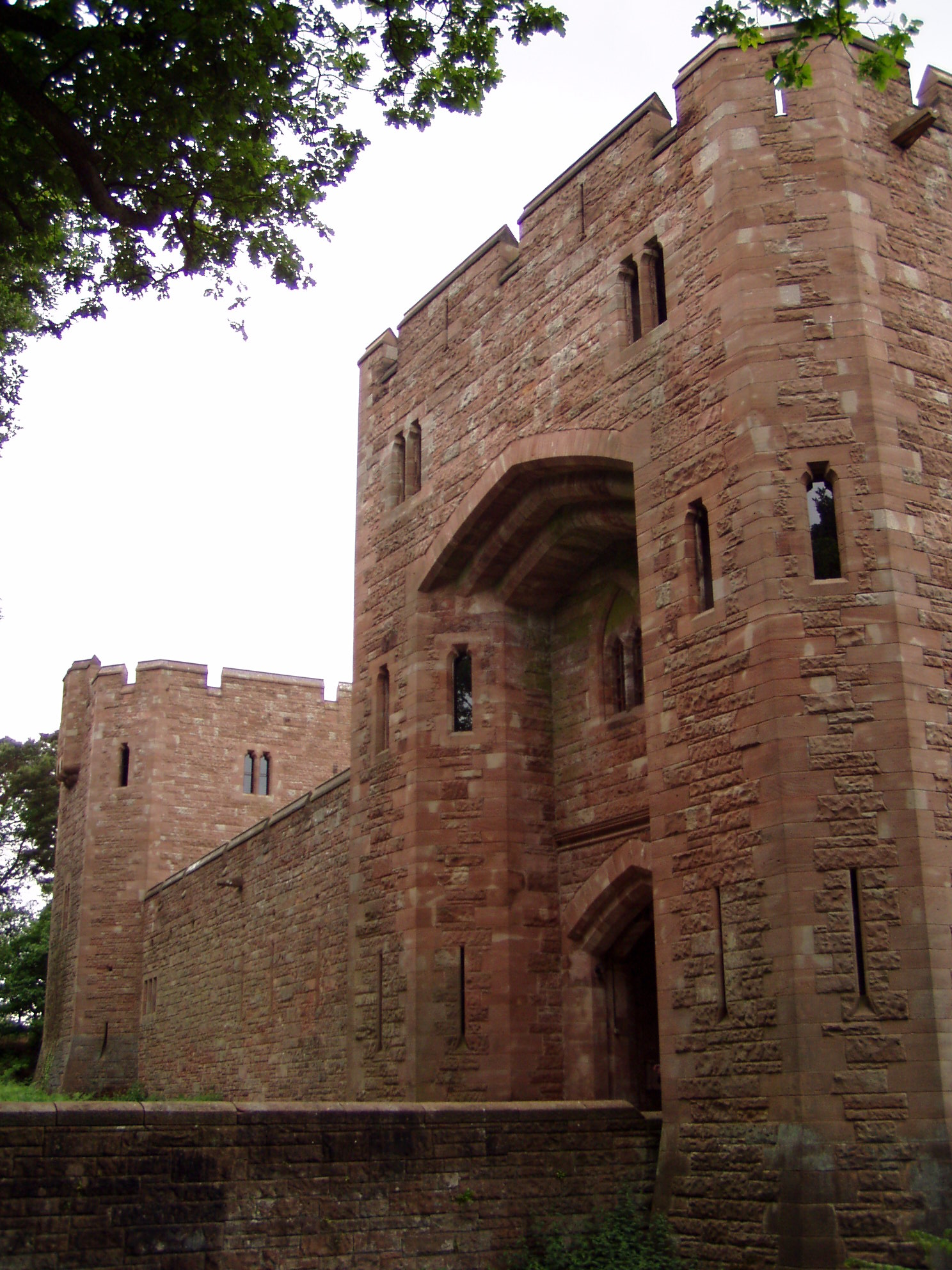
View of the front gate of Peckforton Castle

Peckforton Castle was built between 1844 and 1850 for John Tollemache, the largest landowner in Cheshire at the time, who was described by William Ewart Gladstone as "the greatest estate manager of his day". Tollemache's first choice of architect was George Latham of Nantwich, but he was not appointed, and was paid £2,000 in compensation. Instead Tollemache appointed Anthony Salvin, who had a greater reputation and more experience, and who had already carried out work on the Tollemache manor house, Helmingham Hall in Suffolk. The castle was built by Dean and Son of Leftwich, with Joseph Cookson of Tarporley acting as clerk of works. Stone was obtained from a quarry about 1 mile (2 km) to the west of the site, and a railway was built to carry the stone. The castle cost £60,000.

Although it was built as a family home its design was that of a medieval castle. It has a gatehouse, a portcullis, a dry moat, external windows that are little more than arrow slots, and large towers. In 1851 The Illustrated London News said that it "seems to exhibit the peculiar beauties of Carnarvon Castle without its inconveniences" and in 1858 Sir George Gilbert Scott called it "the largest and most carefully and learnedly executed Gothic mansion of the present" and that it was "the very height of masquerading". It is regarded as "the last serious fortified home built in England" and "it was executed to the highest standards and is one of the great buildings of its age".

There has been debate about the motives for building a more-or-less complete medieval-style castle in the 19th century. Although he was a great estate manager, Tollemache was also perceived as "a man of considerable eccentricity". Dr Jill Allibone is of the opinion that he might have been protecting himself and his family from the political troubles of the time. In a defensive building he would be able to protect himself against any revolution by the masses from nearby Manchester or Liverpool. A possible practical reason for building such a solid residence rather than an Italianate-style villa was to provide shelter from the adverse weather conditions which could affect the Cheshire plain. However Durdey comes to the conclusion that the decisive factors were to use his "vast inheritance" to provide himself with a house that was "impressive, dominant and suitable for Cheshire's greatest landowner".

=== Later history and present use ===
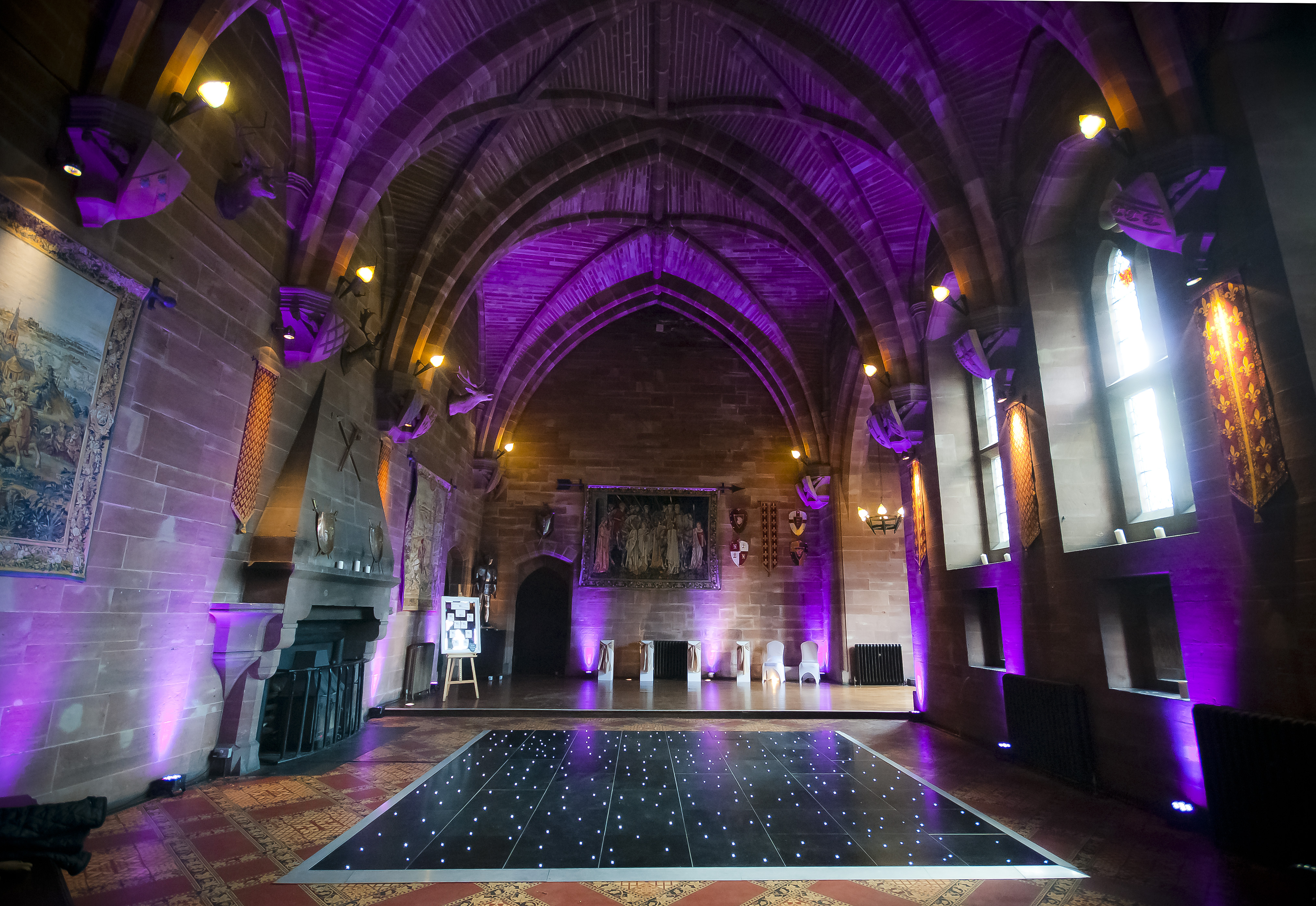
A formal room set up for a wedding reception

Before moving into the castle in the 1890s, Wilbraham Tollemache, 2nd Baron Tollemache, added central heating and electric light. In 1922 a large scheme of afforestation was started on the Peckforton Hills, and the resulting woodland has been granted the status of a Site of Special Scientific Interest. Bentley Tollemache, 3rd Baron Tollemache, grandson of Wilbraham Tollemache, and his family left Peckforton at the outbreak of the Second World War in 1939.

During the war the castle was used as a hostel for physically handicapped children who had been evacuated from the London area. Bentley Tollemache died in 1955 and, as he had no sons, the estate passed to his cousin, John Tollemache. From 1969 to 1980 the castle was leased to an American, George W. Barrett, and used as a private home.

During the 1970s, 1980s and early 1990s, the castle was used as a location for shooting films and television programmes. These include the Doctor Who serial The Time Warrior, broadcast in 1973–74, and a 1991 movie of Robin Hood starring Patrick Bergin and Uma Thurman. From 1982 to 1986, Treasure Trap, one of the world's first live action role-playing games, took place on the site. In 1988 the castle was purchased by an American, Evelyn Graybill, for £1 million. She renovated most of the building and secured planning permission to convert it into a hotel.

In 2006 a member of the Naylor family was married in the castle, and the family subsequently bought it. Peckforton is now used as a hotel and for corporate events and weddings. The building was severely damaged by fire in June 2011 during a wedding, the cost of the damage being in the region of £6 million. In December 2011 the bridegroom admitted to a charge of arson.

== Architecture ==
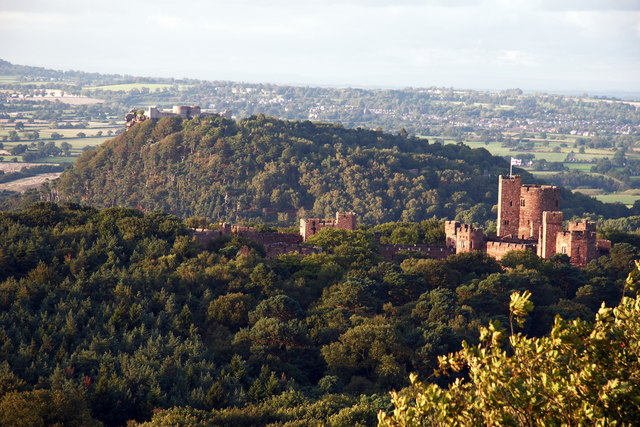
Peckforton Castle is in the right foreground. The medieval Beeston Castle is on the hill beyond at left.

=== Castle ===
==== External ====
The castle is faced with red sandstone, and has lead, asphalt and tile roofs. It is mainly in three storeys with a five-storey tower. The buildings are arranged around a ward with the principal accommodation on the north side. It is surrounded by a dry moat which is bridged at the gatehouse. To the west of the inner ward are the stables, the coach house, a rectangular bell tower and the kitchens and service area. To the north is the great hall range which consists of 18 bays. Behind the entrance to the hall is the circular main tower. At the east end of the gallery wing is the octagonal library tower. The outer walls of the castle have full-height slender turrets at the changes in direction. Corbel tables support part of the battlements. The walls contain arrow slots, and in the gatehouse is a garderobe. The flat roof has a crenellated parapet. The castle is a Grade I listed building.

==== Internal ====
The porch leads into the great hall which has a Minton tile floor and a large stone chimney piece. In the east wing is the long gallery which has oak panelling, a chimney-piece and a panelled ceiling. Behind the long gallery is an irregularly-shaped billiard room and the drawing room. To the south of these is the library. Behind the great hall is the main staircase. The circular tower at the north-west corner contains the octagonal dining room with a Minton tile floor, two fireplaces, and a vault of eight radial ribs running to a central boss. The room contains an oak sideboard with a carved Green Man. Below the dining room is a wine cellar. On the fifth floor of the circular tower is a room designed for playing rackets, which is approached by a stone spiral staircase.

=== Garden ===
The castle had no formal garden, but at the bottom of the drive were kitchen gardens which included vegetable gardens, an orchard, extensive glass houses and a large orangery. At one time, 17 gardeners were employed.

=== Chapel ===
On the east side of the ward is the family's private chapel, a Grade II* listed building. It was also designed by Salvin and is constructed of rock-faced sandstone with a tile roof. Its plan consists of a two-bay nave, a south aisle, a vestry, and a narrower and lower single-bay chancel. On the gable ends of the nave and chancel are stone cross finials. Over the chancel arch is a cruciform stone bellcote. Inside the chapel an arcade of three Gothic arches separates the south aisle from the nave. The reredos is made of oak and is inscribed with the Lord's Prayer and the Ten Commandments. The choirstalls and the benches in the nave are carved with poppyheads. The baptistry at the west end contains a carved stone font with a carved oak cover. Although it is described as a modest building, the chapel is considered to "complete the ensemble" of the castle.

=== Entrance lodge ===
The entrance lodge to the southeast of the castle is also listed at Grade II*. It was designed by Salvin and is constructed in red brick and stone with a tile roof. It consists of an archway with a round turret behind and a two-storey lodge to the left.

== See also ==
- Grade I listed buildings in Cheshire West and Chester
- Listed buildings in Peckforton
- Castles in Great Britain and Ireland
- List of castles in England
