= Listed buildings in Ridley, Cheshire =

Ridley is a civil parish in Cheshire East, England. It contains two buildings that are recorded in the National Heritage List for England as designated listed buildings. Of these, one is listed at Grade II*, the middle grade, and the other is at Grade II. The parish is almost entirely rural, its listed buildings consisting of the gatehouse of a former country house, and a school.

== Key ==
Grade	Criteria
II*	Particularly important buildings of more than special interest
II	Buildings of national importance and special interest

== Buildings ==
Name and location	Photograph	Date	Notes	Grade
Gatehouse, Ridley Hall; 53.08807°N 2.67792°W	—	c. 1530	The gatehouse is all that survives of the original Ridley Hall that burned down in 1700. It is built in stone and brick and has a slated roof, and consists of an archway with a floor above. At the top of the arch is an achievement containing the coat of arms of the Egerton family, flanked by terms, with scrolls, animals, and musicians.	II*
Ridley School; 53.08556°N 2.68527°W	—	1876–77	The school was designed by Thomas Bower in Gothic style. It is built in sandstone with a tiled roof. The school is in a single storey with a three-bay front, and to the east is a two-storey single-bay teacher's house, together forming a T-shaped plan. On the school is a bellcote, and the windows are mullioned, or mullioned and transomed.	II
