= Listed buildings in Bickerton, Cheshire =

Bickerton is a civil parish in Cheshire East, England. It contains four buildings that are recorded in the National Heritage List for England as designated listed buildings, all of which are at Grade II. This grade is the lowest of the three gradings given to listed buildings and is applied to "buildings of national importance and special interest". Apart from the village of Bickerton, the parish is entirely rural. The listed buildings consist of a timber-framed barn, the chimney of the engine house of a closed copper mine, a war memorial, and a church.

Name and location	Photograph	Date	Notes
Barn, Yew Tree Farm; 53.07583°N 2.71333°W	—	Late 17th century	The lower part of the barn is timber-framed with brick nogging on a stone plinth, and the upper part is weatherboarded. The roof is of corrugated metal. The barn has a front of three bays.
Chimney; 53.08317°N 2.72223°W		Early 19th century	The chimney served the engine house of a pump used to drain water from a copper mine. It is constructed in sandstone, and has a square plan. The chimney is in two stages, the lower stage being vertical, and the upper part tapering.
Holy Trinity Church; 53.0769°N 2.7327°W		1839	The church was designed by Edmund Sharpe on land given by Sir Philip Grey Egerton. It is built in sandstone with a slate roof. The chancel was added in 1875–76 and a baptistry in 1911. There is a bellcote on the west gable.
War memorial 53.07730°N 2.73262°W		1919	The war memorial is in Darley Dale sandstone and consists of a Celtic-style wheel-head cross about 4 metres (13 ft) high. It has an angular tapering shaft with chamfered edges, and the front of the head has interlace carving in relief. The shaft stands on a rectangular plinth on a chamfered base of three steps. The sides of the plinth are carved with inscriptions and the names of those lost both World Wars.
