= List of Sites of Special Scientific Interest in Cheshire =

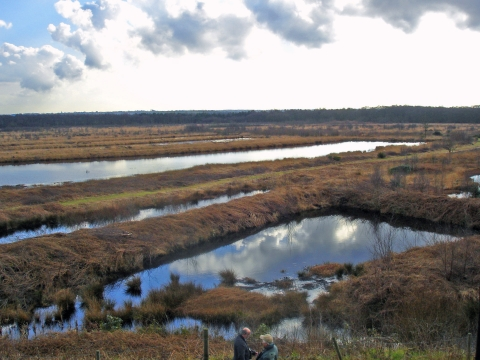
Mosslands, such as Risley Moss, are one of the major habitat types in Cheshire

There are 63 Sites of Special Scientific Interest (SSSIs) in Cheshire, England, covering a total area of 19,844 hectares (49,035 acres). Of these, 51 have been designated for their biological interest, 7 for their geological or geomorphological features, and 5 for both.

SSSIs are governed by the Wildlife and Countryside Act 1981, which mandates that sites be selected for their "flora, fauna, or geological or physiographical features". The body responsible for designating biological SSSIs in England is Natural England, which took over the role of designating and managing SSSIs from English Nature on its creation in 2006. Earth sciences SSSIs are notified separately by the Joint Nature Conservation Committee across the entire UK via Geological Conservation Review. Natural England, like its predecessor bodies, uses a system of areas termed "Areas of Search", which broadly correspond with the 1974–1996 counties, and for consistency the same approach is followed here. In the case of Cheshire, the Area of Search differs from the modern ceremonial county boundary. Since the 1990s, nature conservation in England has also focused on 120 natural areas: regions defined by natural features rather than by administrative boundaries. The Cheshire Area of Search encompasses four natural areas.

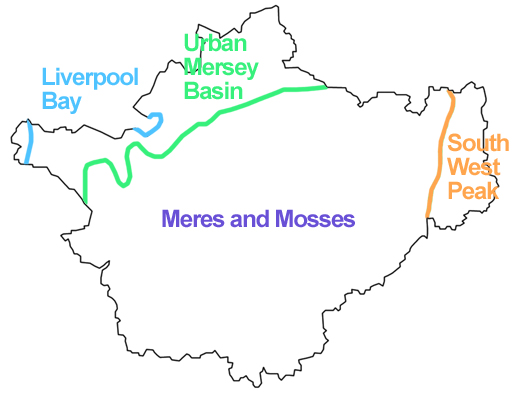
Sketch map showing the broad locations of the four natural areas

The majority of the SSSIs fall within the Meres and Mosses natural area, which covers the bulk of the county, extending into Shropshire and Staffordshire to the south. This region is dominated by the Cheshire Plain, a wide expanse of flat or gently undulating farmland which rarely rises above 100 metres in elevation. Despite intensive agricultural use, diverse wetland habitats survive including mosses (bogs), swamps, fens, meres and thousands of ponds. Flashes, originating in subsidence after salt extraction, contain examples of inland salt marsh, an extremely rare habitat internationally. Ancient woodland is sparse throughout this area, but is found on the slopes of the Mid Cheshire Ridge and in river valleys towards the north of the county. The lowland heath habitat is very rare, occurring only at a handful of sites. The Mid Cheshire Ridge rises abruptly in the middle of the plain, with a high point of 227 metres; its Triassic sandstones are exposed at the Raw Head geological site.

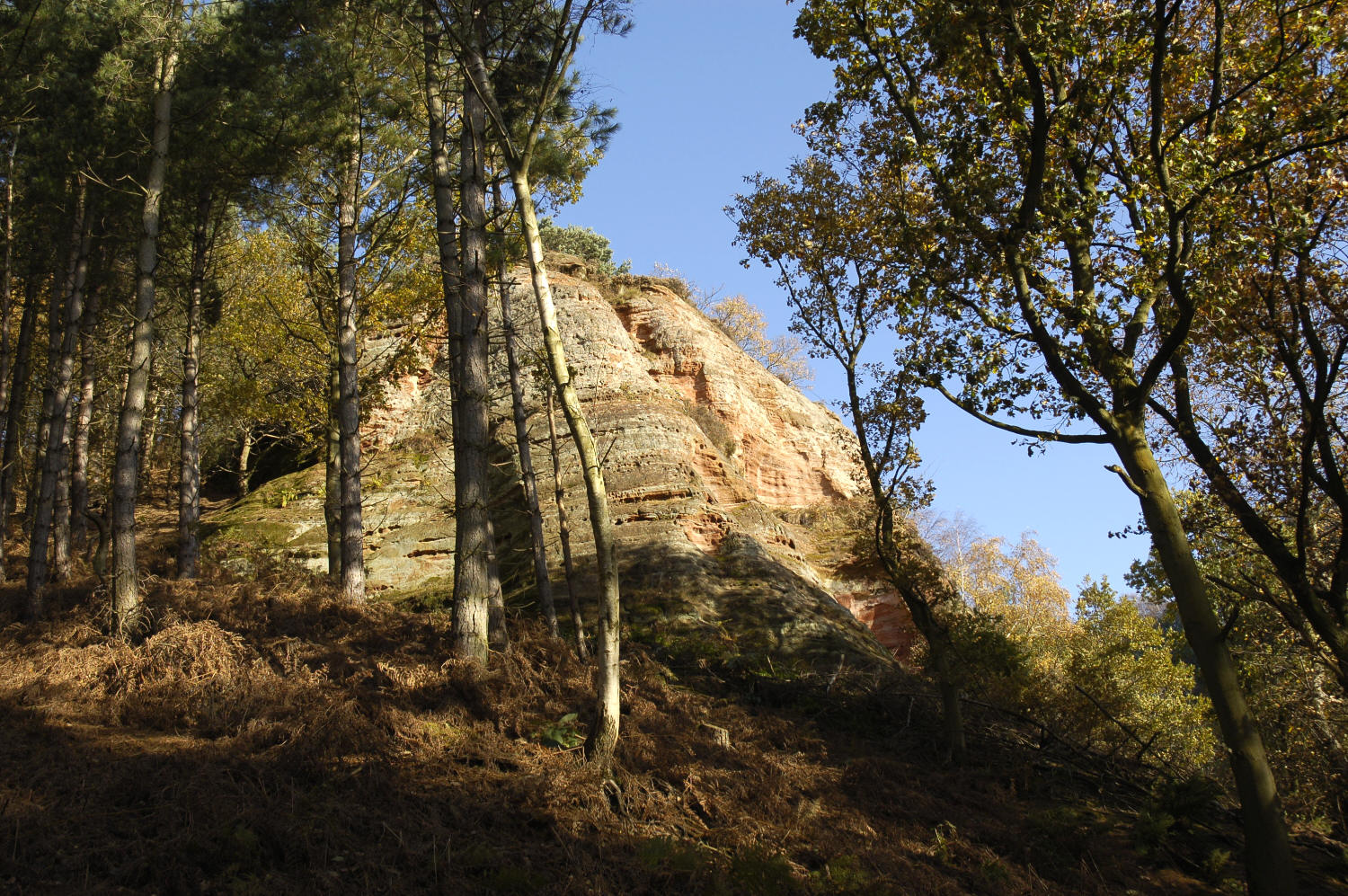
Raw Head is one of the area's geological SSSIs

Two extensive sites, Goyt Valley and Leek Moors, lie at the eastern edge of the county and the south-western end of the Pennines, within the South West Peak natural area of the Peak District. At a significantly higher elevation than the other Cheshire SSSIs and underlain by millstone grit and shale, they contain a variety of upland habitats, predominantly heather moorland, grassland and blanket mire.

Ten SSSIs are located in Warrington and Halton and the former borough of Ellesmere Port & Neston, in the north-west of the county. These fall within the Urban Mersey Basin natural area, which also covers Greater Manchester and Merseyside. Although the area as a whole is one of the most densely populated regions in Europe, much of the area within Cheshire is farmland. Semi-natural habitats here include ancient woodland, raised bog and freshwater wetland. The Rixton Clay Pits site represents former industrial land, and railway cuttings expose geological features. Finally, the Liverpool Bay coastal region contains two estuaries, the Mersey and Dee, which are Cheshire's largest SSSIs.

== Sites ==
Site name	Reason for designation		Area^{[A]}		Grid reference^{[B]}	Year in which notified	Map^{[C]}	Citation^{[D]}
Site name	Biological interest	Geological interest	Hectares	Acres	Grid reference^{[B]}	Year in which notified	Map^{[C]}	Citation^{[D]}
Abbots Moss	✓		38.4	94.8	SJ597690	1984	Map	
Alderley Edge		✓	93.6	231.2	SJ848776	1951	Map	
Bagmere	✓		26.9	66.3	SJ795643	1963	Map	
Bar Mere	✓		12.8	31.5	SJ536478	1979	Map	
Beechmill Wood and Pasture	✓		6.2	15.4	SJ540768	1979	Map	
Betley Mere	✓		29.6	73.2	SJ747480	1963	Map	
Bickerton Hill	✓		91.0	224.8	SJ498530	1979	Map	
Black Lake, Delamere	✓		1.7	4.3	SJ537709	1963	Map	
Brookhouse Moss	✓		10.1	24.9	SJ806617	1979	Map	
Chapel Mere	✓		11.8	29.1	SJ540518	1987	Map	
Comber Mere	✓		65.0	160.5	SJ585442	1963	Map	
Dane-In-Shaw Pasture	✓		8.2	20.2	SJ877625	1990	Map	
Danes Moss	✓		51.3	126.8	SJ905704	1985	Map	
Dee Cliffs, Farndon		✓	2.0	5.0	SJ414542	1979	Map	
Dee Estuary	✓		5,241.2	12,951.2	SJ240804	1954	Map	
Dunsdale Hollow	✓		6.9	17.0	SJ513763	1987	Map	
Flaxmere Moss	✓		7.0	17.2	SJ556723	1965	Map	
Flood Brook Clough	✓		5.1	12.6	SJ532800	1979	Map	
Frodsham Railway and Road Cuttings		✓	1.3	3.3	SJ520780	1979	Map	
Gannister Quarry		✓	1.6	4.0	SJ869592	1985	Map	
Gleads Moss	✓		2.8	6.9	SJ821685	1979	Map	
Goyt Valley	✓		1,332.6	3,292.9	SK028746	1951	Map	
Hallwood Farm Marl Pit	✓		0.1	0.3	SJ343759	1986	Map	
Hatch Mere	✓		13.3	32.7	SJ551721	1951	Map	
Hatherton Flush	✓		1.9	4.8	SJ671482	1985	Map	
Hatton's Hey Wood, Whittle's Corner and Bank Rough	✓		23.7	58.5	SJ570770	1979	Map	
Holcroft Moss	✓		18.1	44.7	SJ685932	1991	Map	
Holly Banks^{[E]}	✓		9.3	23.1	SJ815659	1979	Map	
Inner Marsh Farm	✓		22.5	55.6	SJ307733	1998	Map	
Leek Moors	✓	✓	3,970.8	9,812.1	SK010649	1954	Map	
Lindow Common	✓		17.7	43.7	SJ834811	1963	Map	
Linmer Moss	✓		2.4	5.8	SJ547707	1994	Map	
Little Budworth Common	✓		54.4	134.3	SJ585655	1979	Map	
Madams Wood	✓		9.5	23.4	SJ877650	1990	Map	
Mersey Estuary	✓		6,714.5	16,591.9	SJ395818	1951	Map	
Norbury Meres	✓		23.7	58.6	SJ559492	1979	Map	
Oak Mere	✓		68.8	169.9	SJ574677	1986	Map	
Oakhanger Moss	✓		14.4	35.6	SJ767550	1994	Map	
Peckforton Woods	✓		57.9	143.0	SJ531576	1984	Map	
Pettypool Brook Valley	✓		46.7	115.3	SJ617702	1951	Map	
Plumley Lime Beds	✓		23.3	57.5	SJ707750	1963	Map	
Quoisley Meres	✓		28.3	70.0	SJ548455	1963	Map	
Raw Head		✓	13.5	33.4	SJ508544	1979	Map	
Red Brow Cutting		✓	0.2	0.4	SJ567816	1991	Map	
Risley Moss	✓		83.8	207.1	SJ667917	1986	Map	
River Dane^{[E]}		✓	295.8	730.8	SJ808661	1994	Map	
River Dee (England)	✓	✓	371.5	917.9	SJ407658	1996	Map	
Rixton Clay Pits	✓		13.7	33.7	SJ685901	1979	Map	
Roe Park Woods	✓		35.4	87.5	SJ858583	1990	Map	
Rostherne Mere	✓	✓	152.5	376.8	SJ743842	1984	Map	
Sandbach Flashes	✓	✓	157.1	388.2	SJ726607	1963	Map	
Sound Heath	✓		4.8	11.9	SJ620479	1963	Map	
Tabley Mere	✓		44.9	110.9	SJ723768	1963	Map	
Tatton Meres	✓		90.3	223.2	SJ755799	1963	Map	
Taylor's Rough & Wellmeadow Wood	✓		6.5	16.0	SJ493453	1979	Map	
The Mere, Mere	✓		19.4	48.0	SJ732818	1985	Map	
Warburton's Wood and Well Wood	✓		6.9	17.0	SJ554761	1979	Map	
Well Rough and Long Plantation	✓		8.6	21.2	SJ455443	1979	Map	
Wettenhall and Darnhall Woods	✓		45.3	111.9	SJ649626	1979	Map	
Wimboldsley Wood	✓		16.4	40.6	SJ672643	1979	Map	
Witton Lime Beds	✓		16.4	40.5	SJ660749	1979	Map	
Woolston Eyes	✓		269.8	666.7	SJ662885	1985	Map	
Wybunbury Moss	✓	✓	23.2	57.4	SJ696501	1951	Map	

== Notes ==
All tabulated data are sourced from the Natural England website, and were last updated on 1 March 2010.

^{A} Data rounded to one decimal place. Area in acres converted from hectare value.

^{B} Grid reference is based on the British national grid reference system, also known as OSGB36, and is the system used by the Ordnance Survey.

^{C} Link to maps using the Nature on the Map service provided by Natural England.

^{D} Natural England citation sheets for each SSSI.

^{E} The River Dane and Holly Banks SSSIs overlap.
