= Delamere Forest =

Forest in Cheshire, England

Delamere Forest Park
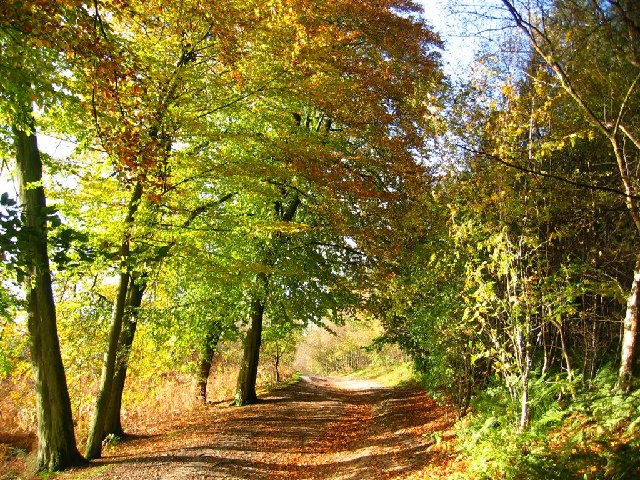
- Deciduous woodland at Delamere Forest in Autumn

- Location within Cheshire
- Type: Forest park
- Location: Cheshire
- OS grid: SJ547704
- Coordinates: 53.2291°N 2.6778°W
- Area: 972 hectares (2,400 acres)
- Elevation: c.75–175 metres (246–574 ft)
- Operator: Forestry England
- Open: 8am–8pm (visitor centre)
- Parking: Six on-site car parks
- Public transit: Delamere railway station
- Website: https://www.forestryengland.uk/delamere-forest

Delamere Forest is a large wood in the village of Delamere in Cheshire, England. The woodland, which is managed by Forestry England, covers an area of 972 hectares (2,400 acres) making it the largest area of woodland in the county. It contains a mixture of deciduous and evergreen trees.

Delamere, which means "forest of the lakes", is all that remains of the great Forests of Mara and Mondrem which covered over 60 square miles (160 km^{2}) of this part of Cheshire. Established in the late 11th century, they were the hunting forests of the Norman Earls of Chester. Order was maintained under forest law. However this governance limited the agricultural potential of the area for centuries. It was not until ownership passed to the Crown in 1812 that the ancient ordinances were abolished. In 1924 the woodland came under the control of the Forestry Commission.

The area also includes Old Pale hill, the high point of the northern mass of the Mid Cheshire Ridge, and Blakemere Moss, a lake around 1 kilometre (0.62 mi) in length. Black Lake, a rare example of quaking bog or schwingmoor, has been designated a Site of Special Scientific Interest (SSSI) and forms part of an international Ramsar site; Linmer Moss has also been designated an SSSI for its fenland habitat. The white-faced darter, a species of dragonfly rare in the UK, and marsh fern and white sedge, wetland plants that are rare in Cheshire, are found here.

Delamere Forest is a popular recreational area that is used by approximately 750,000 visitors each year, including walkers, cyclists, mountain bikers and horse riders. It is also an outdoor concert venue.

== History ==
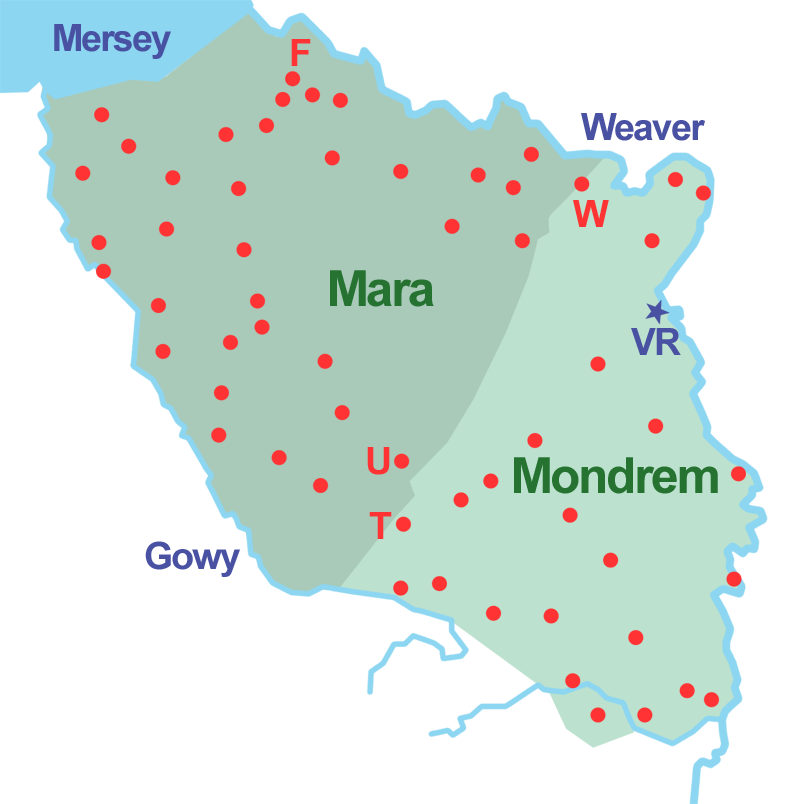
The Forests of Mara and Mondrem (c. 1277–1536). Red dot: township within the forest; F: Frodsham; T: Tarporley; U: Utkinton; VR: Vale Royal Abbey; W: Weaverham

=== Hunting forest ===
The twin medieval Forests of Mara and Mondrem were created within the county palatine of Cheshire by the Norman Earls of Chester in the late 11th century. However the area might have earlier been an Anglo-Saxon hunting forest. Covering more than 60 square miles (160 km^{2}), the forest stretched from the Mersey in the north to Nantwich in the south, and from the Gowy in the west to the Weaver in the east. Between 1277 and 1536, the forests encompassed more than 60 townships or villages. In this context, "forest" means an area outside the common law and subject to forest law; it does not imply that the area was entirely wooded, and the land remained largely in private ownership. Game was hunted with dogs and included wild boar, and red, fallow and roe deer. During the early Norman period, the penalties for killing game were blinding, mutilation or execution; although these punishments were gradually replaced by fines.

The original forest was a predominantly oak-mixed woodland, but other species included elm, lime, yew, chestnut, ash, silver birch, hazel, willow and alder. The forest area also encompassed heath and wetland, as well as pasture, arable land and even small settlements. Agriculture was, however, allowed within the forest boundaries only under severe restrictions; assarting, or enclosing and clearing new land for agriculture, was prohibited until 1215.

As large areas of Mondrem were slowly cleared of woodland, the northerly Forest of Mara remained wooded well into the 14th century. It retained a population of wild boar and wolves.

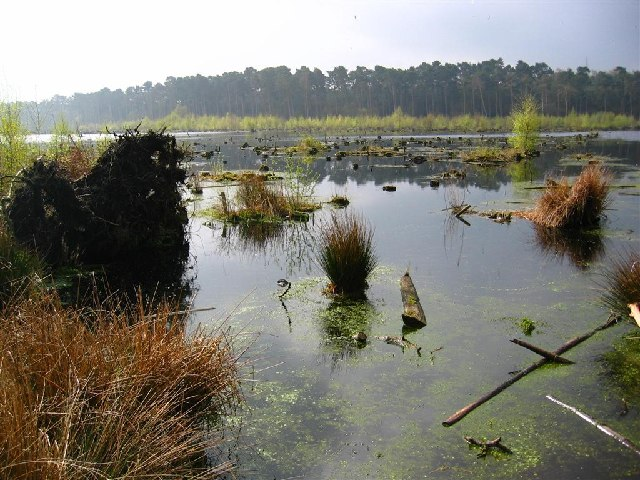
Blakemere Moss in 2004, six years after it was flooded

=== Later history ===
The remaining part of the southern part of the Forest of Mara remained classed as a hunting forest until 1812 when an Enclosure Act was passed disafforesting the remaining forest (that is, returning its legal status to ordinary land) and transferring ownership of the remnant half to the Crown and half to surrounding major landowners. In April 1821, the King's Bench determined that Delamere was one of four new parishes within the old Forest of Mara during a case about a pauper from Oakmere. The Forestry Commission, which was established in 1919, took over the management of Delamere Forest in 1924; the land was managed for timber production. Its management area occupies 16 percent of the former medieval forests. Since 1968, the Forestry Commission has worked with successive local authorities (now Cheshire West and Chester) to promote recreational usage of the area.

==== Blakemere Moss ====
Blakemere Moss was drained in around 1815, supposedly by prisoners from the Napoleonic Wars. During the 19th century, it was unsuccessfully planted with oak, and later with Scots pine. The Forestry Commission planted the moss with pine and western hemlock during the 1940s, which proved uneconomic. In 1996 as part of a landscape planning exercise for Delamere Forest a hydrological survey was commissioned to look at the feasibility of clear-felling the area that is now Blakemere Moss. Once the hydrological survey confirmed that it was possible to re-water the site, clear-felling took place in 1998 and the moss was allowed to re-water by damming the drainage points. The restored moss now provides a habitat for a variety of wildlife, particularly waterfowl. Following the success of the project, it was announced in January 2010 that a further 33 hectares (82 acres) of drained fenland at four sites in the Delamere Forest area would be rewatered as part of Natural England's "Wetland Vision" scheme.

== Geography and geology ==
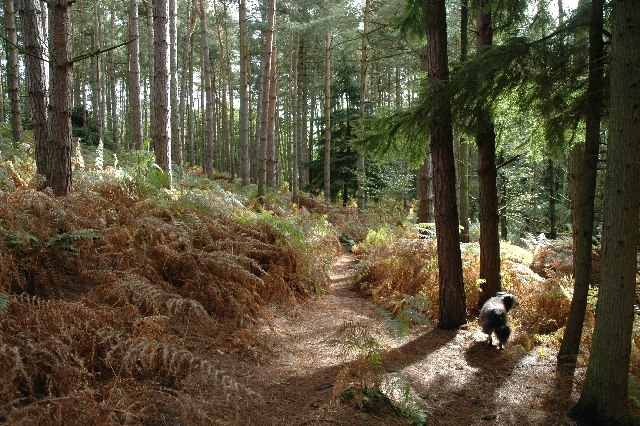
Coniferous plantation

Delamere Forest forms part of the Mersey Forest, an initiative to increase woodland coverage in areas close to urban communities. Nearly all the Forestry Commission land is open access land under the Countryside and Rights of Way Act 2000. A few small additional areas contiguous with the Forestry Commission land are also wooded.

The Mid-Cheshire Railway Line runs east–west through Delamere Forest; Delamere railway station is located at SJ555704, around ½ mile (800 m) from the Linmere Visitor Centre. The B5152 road runs north–south through the forest, and Ashton Road runs east–west. The National Cycle Network Cheshire Cycleway (Regional Route 70) follows Ashton Road. The nearest town is Frodsham, to the north-west; nearby settlements (anti-clockwise from the south) include Delamere, Cuddington, Norley, Kingsley, Mouldsworth and Kelsall.

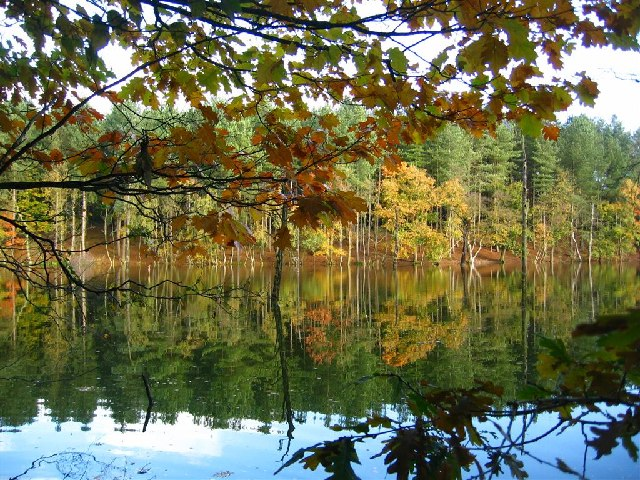
Dead Lake

=== Mouldsworth Gap ===
The majority of the modern Delamere Forest falls within the Mouldsworth Gap, a break in the Mid Cheshire Ridge which runs north–south through the centre of Cheshire. This region originated at the end of the last ice age, when glacial meltwaters formed a vast lake in the West Cheshire basin which burst through the sandstone ridge, and deposited large amounts of sand and gravel across an extensive outwash fan on the eastern side of the ridge. The soils are very varied, including brown earths, podsols, peats and gleys. One valley adjacent to the railway line has eight different soil types within a small area, and hosts a soil trail.

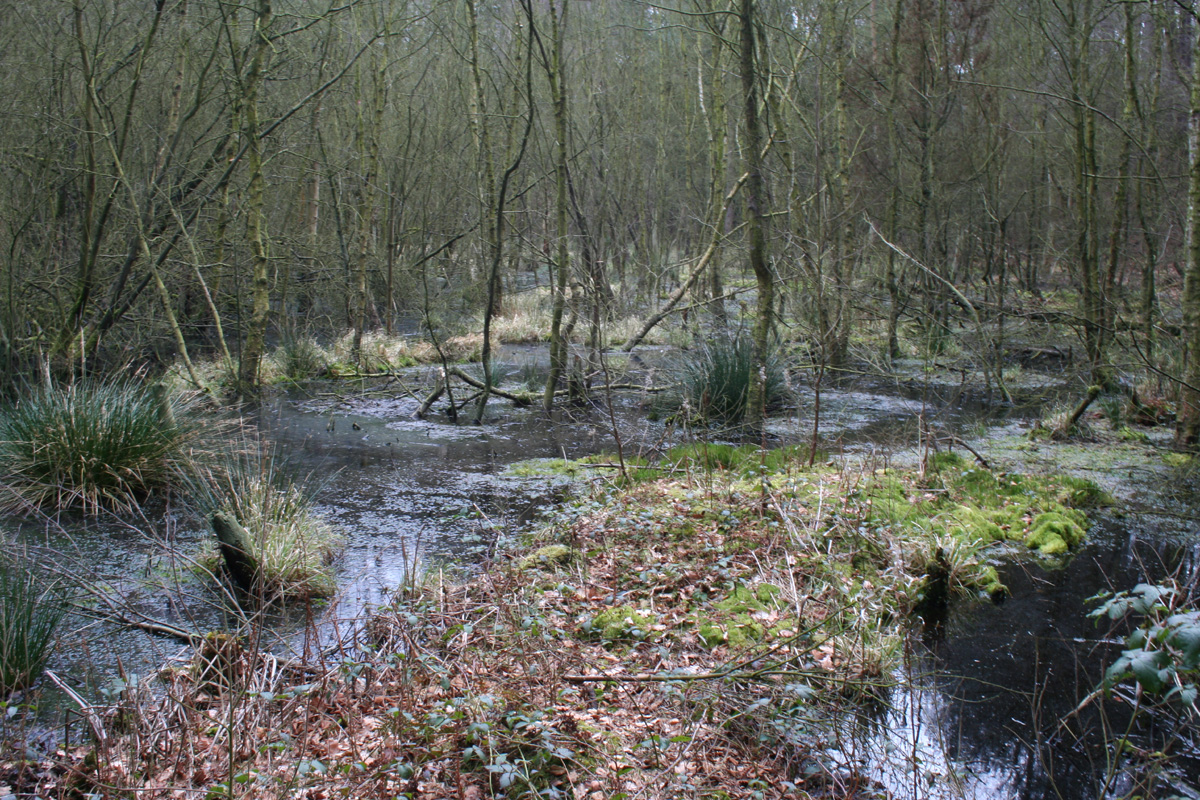
Typical wetland, near Hunger Hill

This part of Delamere Forest is undulating in character, with elevations predominantly in the range 60–90 metres. It is composed of numerous hummocks and peatland basins, some of which are glacial in origin while others have been created by sand extraction. The basins form lakes and mosses (bogs) within the forest, the largest of which is Blakemere Moss, which originated in two glacial kettle holes and is now a lake around 1 km in length. Other sizeable wetlands include Black Lake, Dead Lake and Linmer Moss. This forest area has several named local high points, including Hart Hill, Hunger Hill and Manley Hill.

=== Old Pale ===
The Old Pale hill (176 metres; SJ543696) stands towards the south of the Forestry Commission-owned area; it forms the high point of the northern mass of the Mid Cheshire Ridge. The summit, Pale Heights, has a trig point and three transmitter masts which carry radio, television and telephone signals. There is a view point with views of twelve counties and metropolitan boroughs: Cheshire, Cumbria, Derbyshire, Greater Manchester, Lancashire, Merseyside, Shropshire and Staffordshire in England, and Conwy, Denbighshire, Flintshire, Powys and Wrexham in Wales.

== Ecology ==
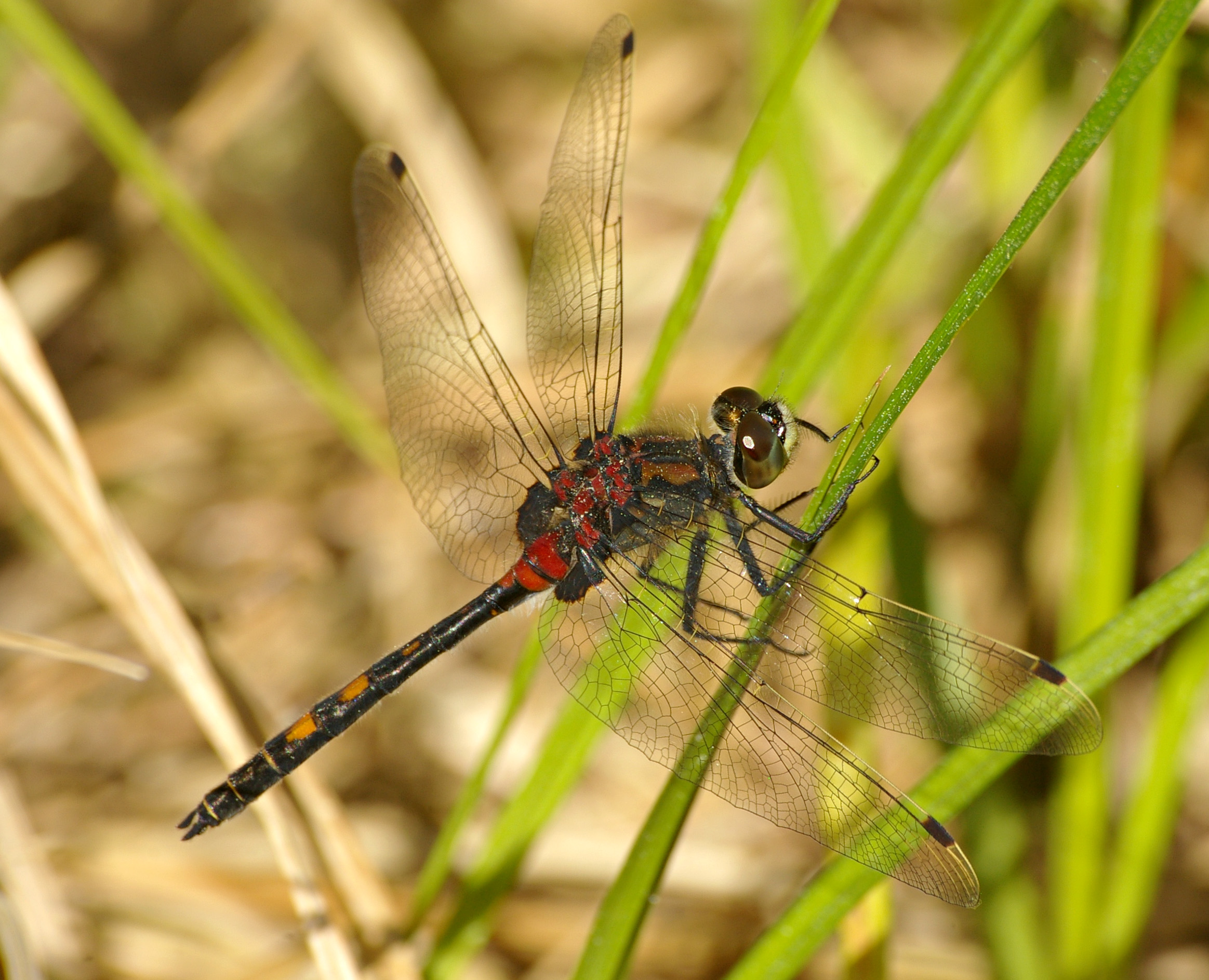
White-faced darter

Delamere Forest encompasses broadleaved and mixed woodlands, blocks of coniferous plantation, as well as grassland and wetland. The area provides a habitat for numerous woodland bird species, including nuthatches, treecreepers, common crossbills, Eurasian siskins, tawny owls and great spotted and green woodpeckers. Dragonflies such as the southern hawker can be seen in the wetland areas; the nationally scarce white-faced darter has been observed at several sites within the forest, including Black Lake. Butterflies such as the small tortoiseshell are common in the Old Pale area. Adders have been observed in the woodland, and mammals seen here include badgers, foxes and bats.

=== Sites of Special Scientific Interest ===
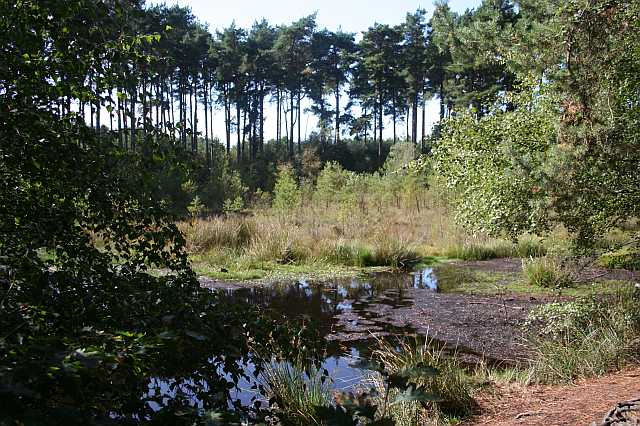
Black Lake

Two Sites of Special Scientific Interest (SSSIs) lie within the area of Delamere Forest owned by the Forestry Commission. Black Lake (SJ537709) is an example of the rare quaking bog or schwingmoor habitat, a type of bog in which bog vegetation forms a raft which floats on top of water. The site is particularly notable for including the very earliest stages in quaking bog development, although all stages are present, from open water to largely consolidated schwingmoor in the process of colonisation by Scots pine. In addition to Sphagnum species, common sundew and the locally rare white sedge are present. The site is managed by Cheshire Wildlife Trust and forms part of the Midland Meres and Mosses Ramsar site.

Linmer Moss (SJ546706) is unusual within Delamere Forest in having a fen environment which is not dominated by Sphagnum species. The vegetation is predominantly tussock sedge and reedmace. Marsh fern and white sedge, which are rare in Cheshire, are found here; other species include cuckooflower, marsh bedstraw, marsh cinquefoil and Sphagnum squarrosum. The site has experienced rapid changes in water levels during its history, and contains the trunks of birch trees which died when the area flooded. It is now being colonised by alder and willow.

Multiple other wetland SSSIs fall within the historical bounds of Delamere Forest, including Hatch Mere and Flaxmere Moss, which lie immediately outside the Forestry Commission boundary, as well as Abbotts Moss, Oak Mere and Pettypool Brook Valley. Little Budworth Common SSSI and the woodland around Abbotts Moss are considered to be among the closest modern representatives of the forest before human settlement in the area.

== Recreational uses ==
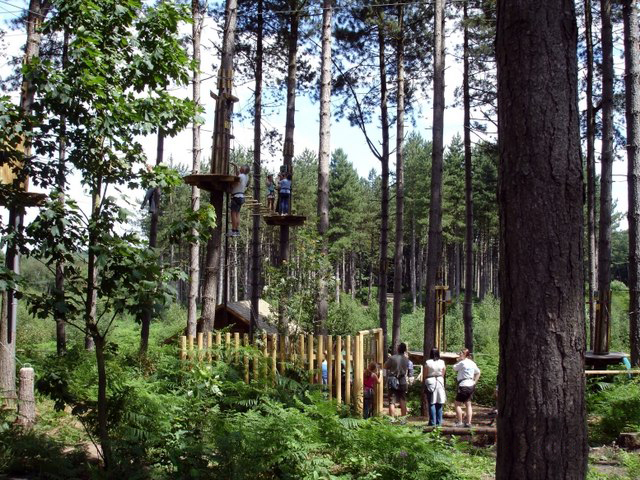
Part of the Go Ape course

Delamere Forest is a popular recreational area, drawing visitors mainly from nearby urban areas. Three long-distance footpaths meander through the forest, the Sandstone Trail, Delamere Way and Baker Way. Two waymarked circular walking trails of 1.7 and 2.7 miles (2.7 and 4.3 km) and two waymarked cycling trails of 4 and 7 miles (6.4 and 11.3 km) start near the Linmere Visitor Centre; the cycling trails are also open to walkers. There are two easy-access circular trails which are suitable for wheelchair users and pushchairs; one starts at Barnsbridge Gates car park and leads to Blakemere Moss (0.75 miles (1.2 km) in length), the other explores Old Pale hill from the Linmere Visitor Centre. Numerous non-waymarked footpaths are also available for both cyclists and walkers. There is a large area of dirt cycle jumps on Manley Hill for mountain biking enthusiasts.

Other activities include horse riding, jogging, orienteering, bird watching and nature study. Britain's largest Go Ape facility opened in Delamere Forest in 2006; it includes numerous zip wires, Tarzan swings, tightropes and nets high in the treetops. Delamere Forest is the venue for the northern Hellrunner cross-country race, and the Sandstone Trail Race finishes in the forest. A parkrun takes place weekly on Saturdays; the course is one loop of Blakemere Moss on the forest's trails.

Since 2003, the Old Pale area of the forest has served as a music venue, playing host to performers including Ian Brown, The Charlatans, Jools Holland, Status Quo, Sugababes, Paul Weller, The Zutons, Tears for Fears, Doves and Elbow. The forest has also been used for open-air theatre.

Delamere Forest's new visitor centre, a timber-framed building, includes a cafe, event spaces, and a cycle hub, and was completed in August 2020. The centre was developed by Willmott Dixon on behalf of Forestry England. It also features a large outdoor covered seating area, accessible toilets, and a 500-space car park.

== See also ==
- List of Sites of Special Scientific Interest in Cheshire
- List of parks and open spaces in Cheshire
