= Black Lake Nature Reserve =

Nature reserve in Cheshire, England

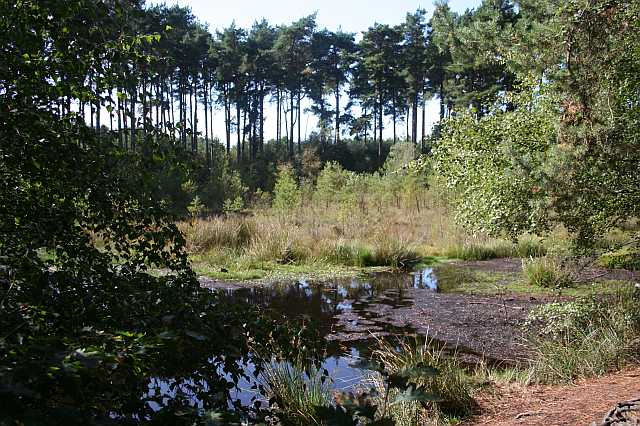

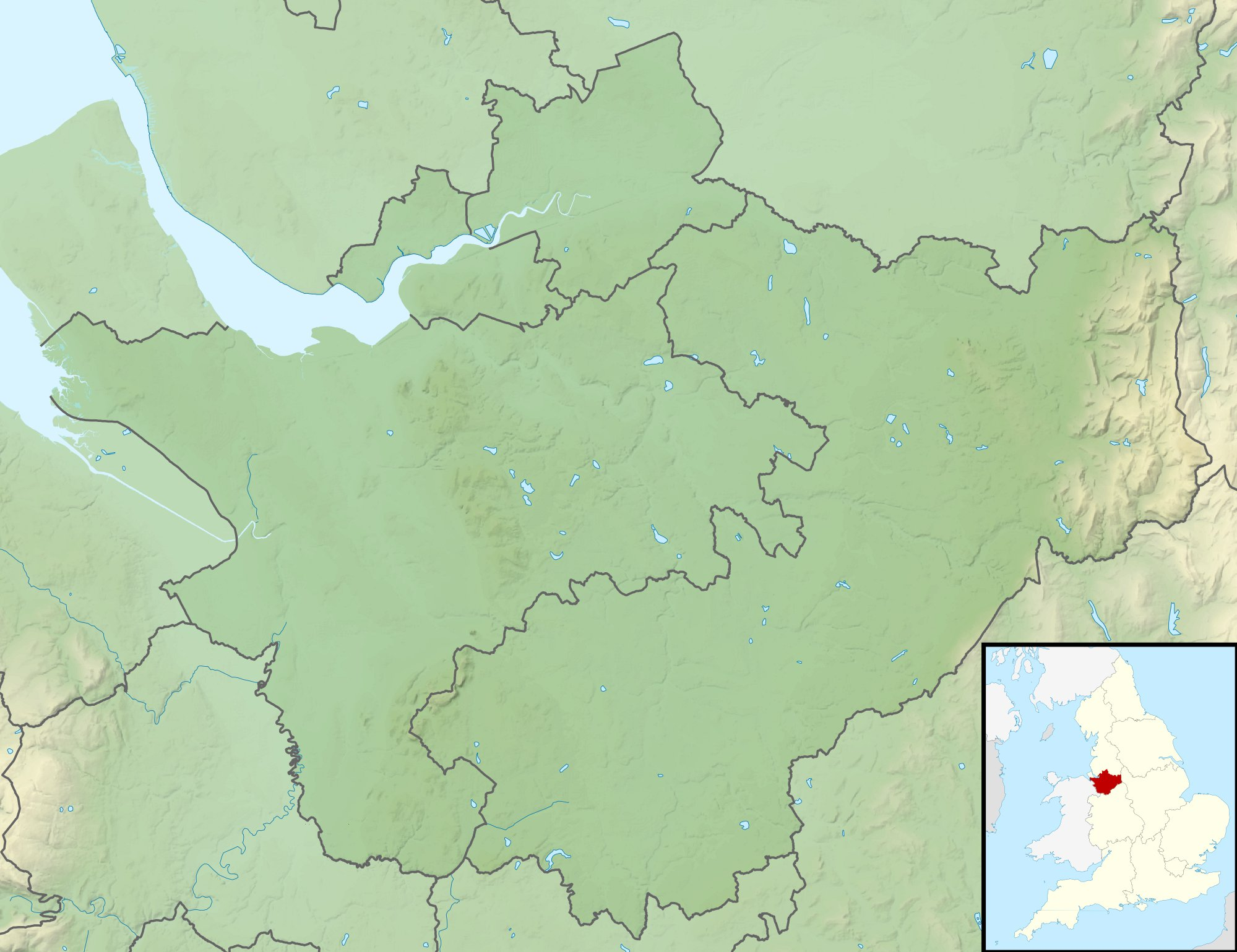
- Location within Cheshire
- Interactive map of Black Lake Nature Reserve
- Type: Nature reserve and SSSI
- Location: Delamere Forest, Cheshire
- OS grid: SJ537709
- Coordinates: 53.2333°N 2.6944°W
- Area: 0.4 hectares (0.99 acres)
- Elevation: 75m
- Operator: Cheshire Wildlife Trust
- Open: any reasonable time

Black Lake is a nature reserve in Delamere Forest, Cheshire, England. It lies in the southwestern corner of the forest, just south of the Manchester–Chester railway. It is managed by the Cheshire Wildlife Trust (CWT) on behalf of the Forestry Commission, and as a Site of Special Scientific Interest (SSSI) is monitored by Natural England.

The site is designated as an SSSI because "it represents a very early stage of a Schwingmoor type basin fen and occurs in association with dystrophic open water." A Schwingmoor or quaking bog occurs when plants such as Sphagnum mosses and cotton grass Eriophorum sp. colonise the surface of a waterbody and form a floating mat of vegetation; at Black Lake the Sphagnum raft covers around half the lake surface. The SSSI (which includes the surrounding catchment area) covers an area of 1.74 hectares (4.3 acres); the CWT reserve is 0.40 hectares (0.99 acres) in area.

The site is also noted for its uncommon dragonflies, which formerly included the white-faced darter (Leucorrhinia dubia).

== History ==
The depression containing Black Lake was created by the melting of an ice-block at the end of the last Ice Age some 10,000 years ago. The lake was enlarged as a duck pond in the 1820s. By the 1940s it was completely covered by Sphagnum moss, and in 1973 had developed a hummocked appearance and had been colonised by young trees. The building of a crushed-limestone road nearby changed the acidity of the conditions and the moss Sphagnum cuspidatum, which hosted the nymphs of the white-faced darter, disappeared. In 1995 the limestone material was removed, and the raft of vegetation began to recover, but the white-faced darter has not been recorded since 1997.

== Key species ==
The following species of dragonflies and damselflies have been recorded at Black Lake: white-faced darter (Leucorrhinia dubia, last recorded 1997), brown hawker (Aeshna grandis), four-spotted chaser (Libellula quadrimaculata), common darter (Sympetrum striolatum), black darter (Sympetrum danae), large red damselfly (Pyrrhosoma nymphula) and common blue damselfly (Enallagma cyathigerum).

Unusual plants for the area include common sundew (Drosera rotundifolia), white sedge (Carex curta), common cottongrass (Eriophorum angustifolium) and wild cranberry (Vaccinium oxycoccos).
