= Abbotts Moss Nature Reserve =

Nature reserve in Cheshire, England

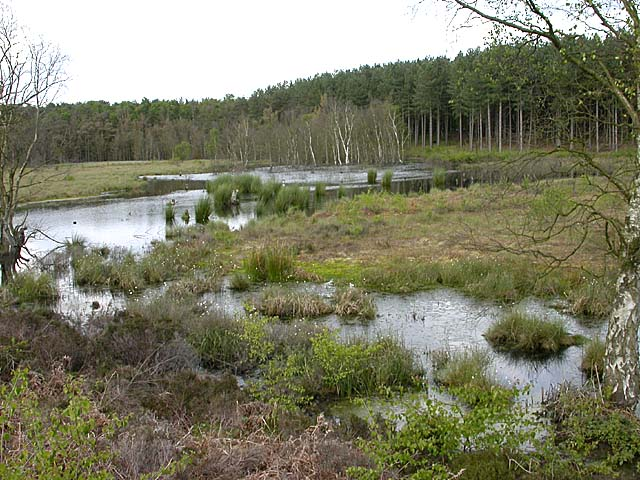
- Shemmy Moss

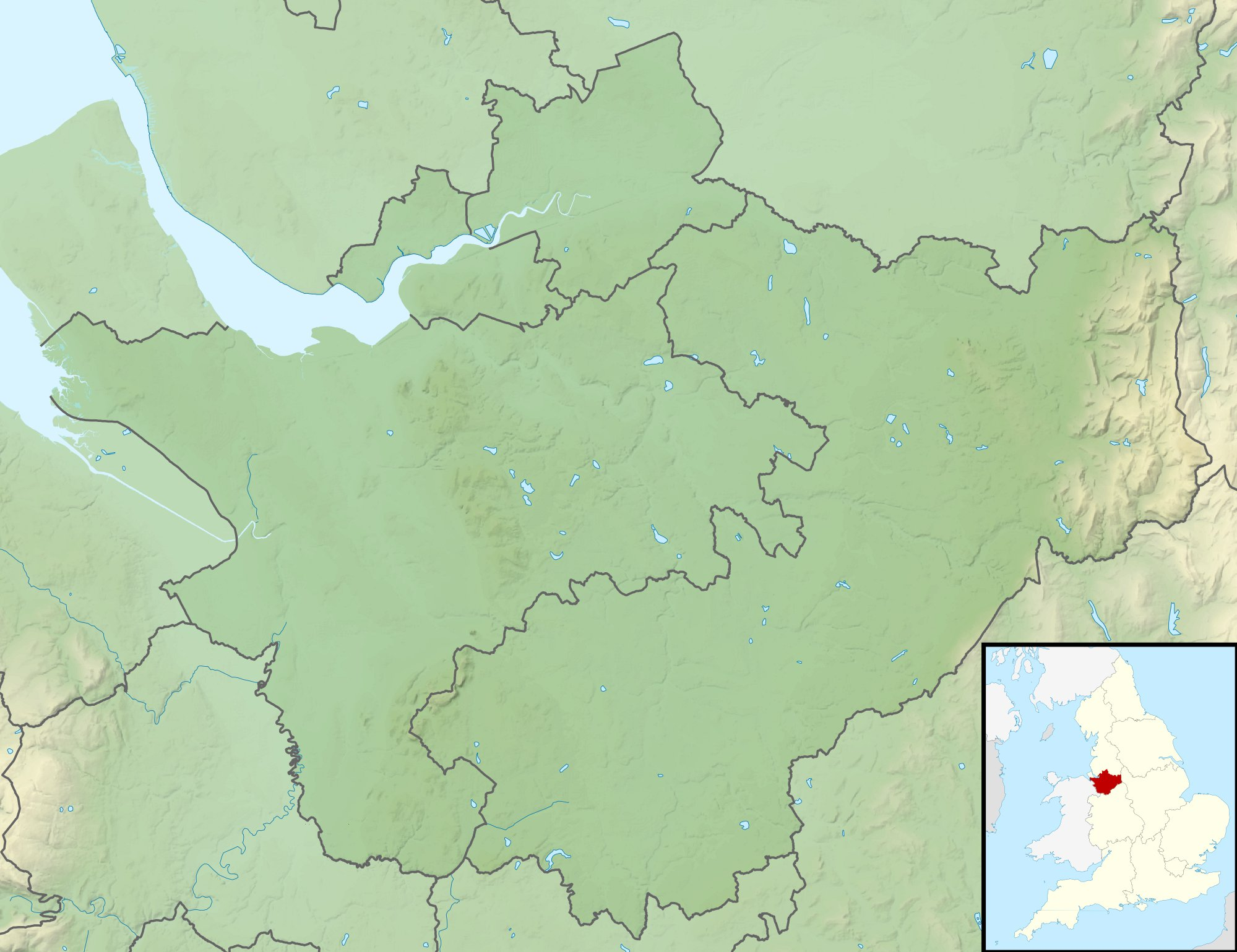
- Location within Cheshire
- Interactive map of Abbotts Moss Nature Reserve
- Type: Nature reserve and SSSI
- Location: Delamere Forest, Cheshire
- OS grid: SJ595688
- Coordinates: 53.2154°N 2.6078°W
- Area: 12 hectares (30 acres)
- Elevation: 75m
- Operator: Cheshire Wildlife Trust
- Open: any reasonable time

Abbotts Moss is a 12-hectare (30-acre) nature reserve near Delamere Forest, northwest of Winsford, Cheshire. It is managed by the Cheshire Wildlife Trust under lease from the Forestry Commission and lies within a larger Site of Special Scientific Interest (SSSI). The reserve is south of the A556 road near Sandiway and is divided in two by the Whitegate Way, a former railway line now used as a footpath and bridleway.

== Notability and key species ==
The SSSI citation notes that the site is an acidic wetland of particular importance because of two mature Schwingmoors, namely South Moss and Shemmy Moss. A Schwingmoor or quaking bog occurs when plants such as Sphagnum mosses and cotton grass Eriophorum sp. colonise the surface of a waterbody and form a floating mat of vegetation.

Locally uncommon plants growing here include common cottongrass Eriophorum angustifolium, cranberry Vaccinium oxycoccos, round-leaved sundew Drosera rotundifolia, crowberry Empetrum nigrum, hare’s-tail cottongrass Eriophorum vaginatum, bog rosemary Andromeda polifolia, white beak-sedge Rhynchospora alba and the carnivorous lesser bladderwort Utricularia minor.

Dragonflies include the nationally rare white-faced darter Leucorrhinia dubia and the locally uncommon downy emerald Cordulia aenea and black darter Sympetrum danae. Abbotts Moss is one of only two sites in Cheshire where adders Vipera berus are found. Eurasian woodcock Scolopax rusticola breed, as do common redstart Phoenicurus phoenicurus and tree pipit Anthus trivialis. Over 150 species of spider have been recorded within the reserve.
