= Danes Moss Nature Reserve =

Nature reserve in Cheshire, England

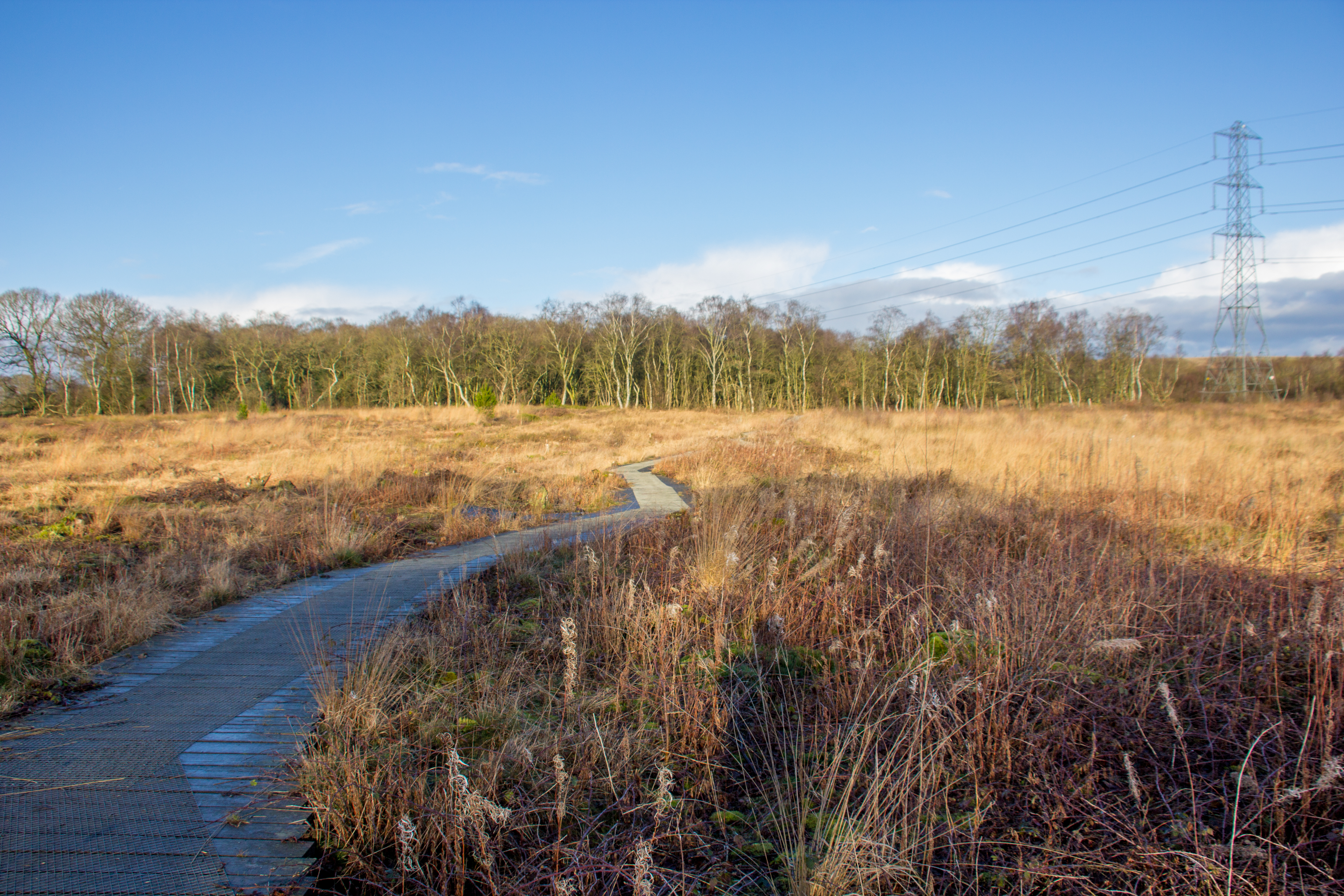
- A path across the lowland bog, leading to the wooded area

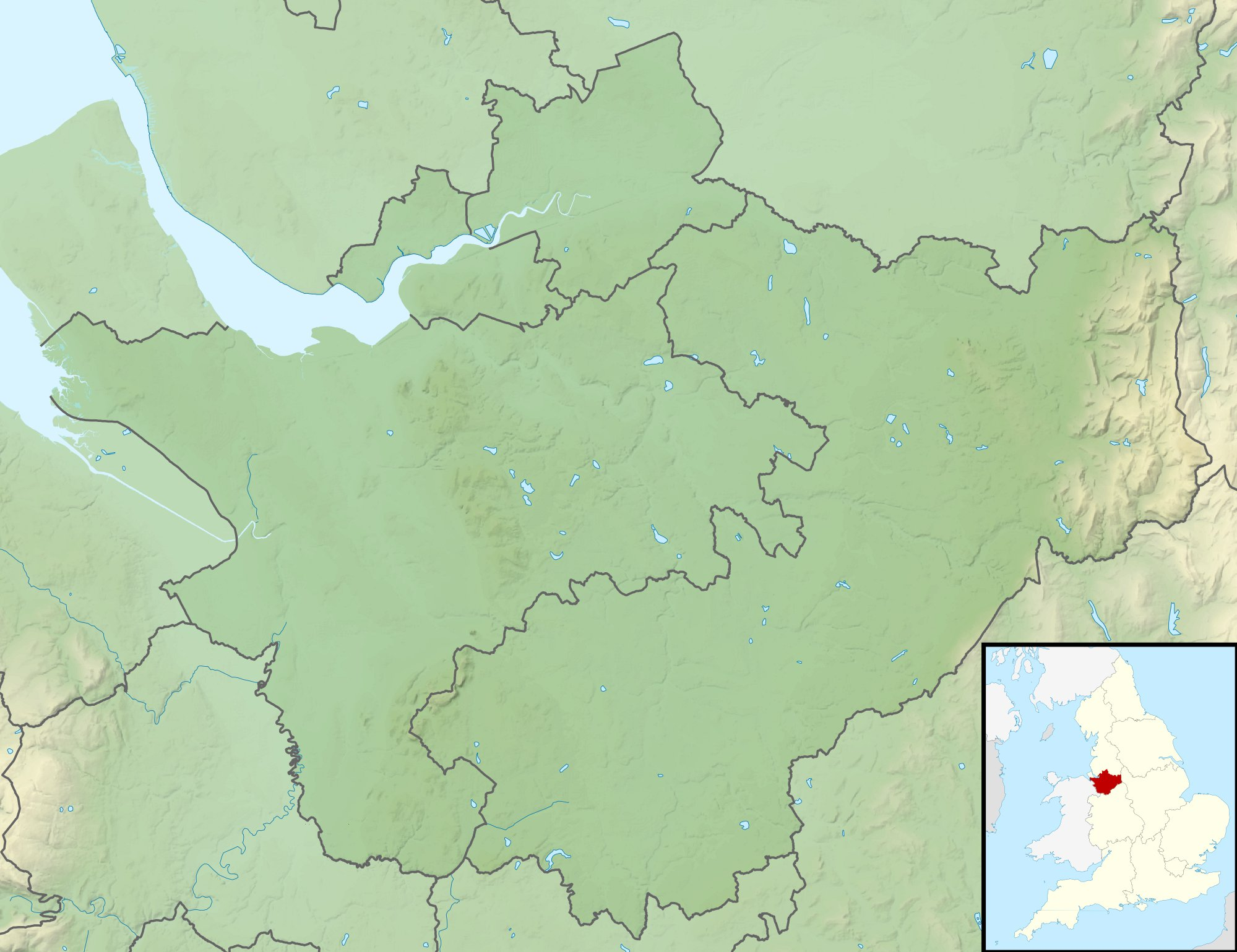
- Location within Cheshire
- Interactive map of Danes Moss Nature Reserve
- Type: Nature reserve and SSSI
- Location: near Macclesfield, Cheshire
- OS grid: SJ907704
- Coordinates: 53.23°N 2.14°W
- Area: 13.4 hectares (33 acres)
- Elevation: 160m
- Operator: Cheshire Wildlife Trust
- Open: at all times

Danes Moss Nature Reserve is a 13.4-hectare (33-acre) nature reserve south of Macclesfield, Cheshire, England. A Site of Special Scientific Interest, it is managed by the Cheshire Wildlife Trust.

Danes Moss is a lowland raised bog, a rare and threatened habitat in the United Kingdom. The SSSI citation describes it as "the largest example in Cheshire of a cut-over raised mire...a valuable example of a habitat now rare in lowland England", noting that the peat is up to 5 metres (16 ft) deep, a substantial thickness. Seven species of Sphagnum moss are found here. Locally uncommon plants include round-leaved sundew (Drosera rotundifolia), marsh cinquefoil (Potentilla palustris), bottle sedge (Carex rostrata), common lousewort (Pedicularis sylvatica) and fen bedstraw (Galium uliginosum) and the nationally rare Labrador-tea (Rhododendron tomentosum).

The reserve is also known for its insects. Eleven species of dragonflies and damselflies have been recorded, including the black darter (Sympetrum danae) (Britain's smallest dragonfly) and the four-spotted chaser (Libellula quadrimaculata). They are joined by 19 species of butterfly, including the green hairstreak (Callophrys rubi).
