= Hatchmere =

Nature reserve in Cheshire, England

Hatch Mere Nature Reserve
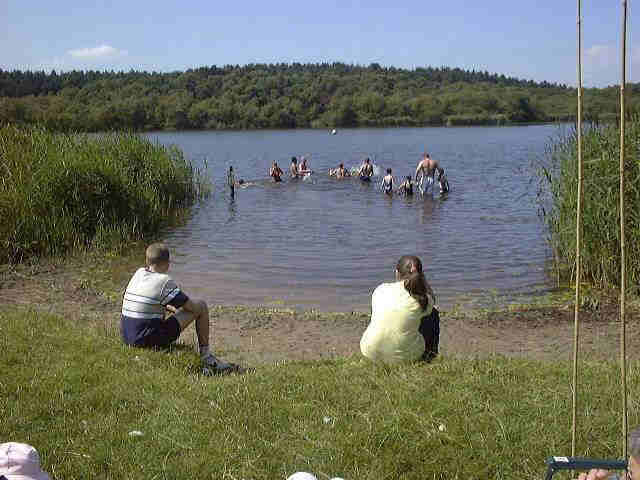
- Swimmers in Hatchmere

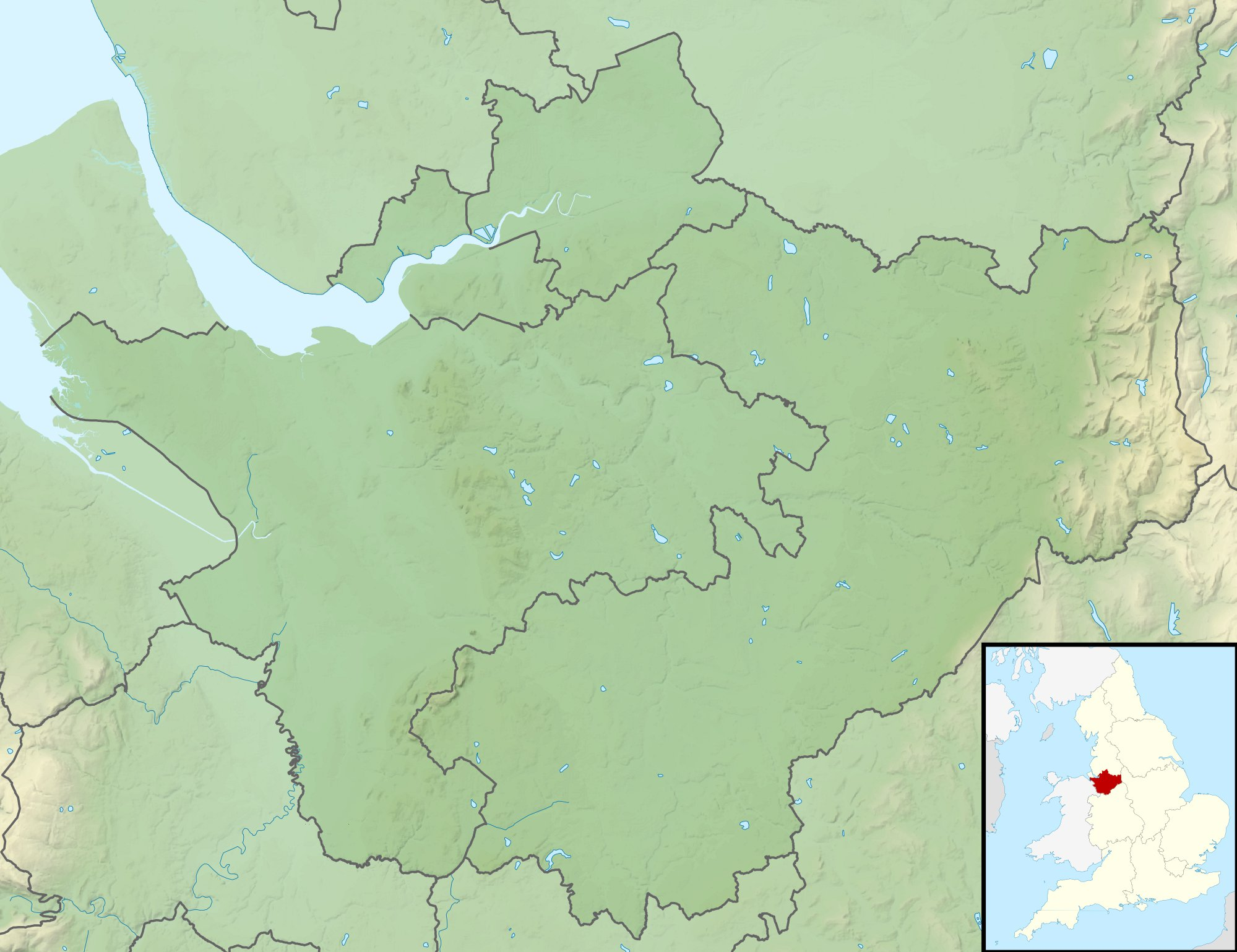
- Location within Cheshire
- Type: Nature reserve and SSSI
- Location: Delamere Forest, Cheshire
- OS grid: SJ537709
- Coordinates: 53.244°N 2.672°W
- Area: 12.6 hectares (31 acres)
- Elevation: 80m
- Operator: Cheshire Wildlife Trust
- Open: any reasonable time

Hatchmere is a small mere and nature reserve in Delamere Forest, southeast of Frodsham, Cheshire, England. It is also the name of a hamlet near the village of Norley.

== Nature reserve ==
Hatch Mere Nature Reserve covers 12.6 hectares (31 acres). It lies within a Site of Special Scientific Interest (SSSI), and is managed by the Cheshire Wildlife Trust.

According to the SSSI citation "Hatch Mere is an example of a mere with moderate fertility and well developed floating and emergent vegetation. It is an unusual mere because of the surrounding vegetation which consists largely of acidic heath and bog communities." The mere is a good example of a kettle hole, of which there are several in the Delamere area. Some are flooded as here whilst others are dry or contain peat mosses. The mere originated as a detached mass of glacial ice that melted in situ towards the end of the last ice age.

Notable animal species include the Hairy Dragonfly Brachytron pratense, Variable Damselfly Coenagrion pulchellum and a rare caddisfly, Potomophylax rotundipennis. Rare plants for the area include Tufted Sedge Carex elata and Bog Myrtle Myrica gale.

There were several campaigns to maintain public access to the lake after it was bought by the Wildlife Trust in 1998. Initially the Trust fenced off the only access point to the lake suitable for swimmers. A pressure group, the Friends of Hatchmere, was formed, and eventually the Wildlife Trust backed down and agreed to allow swimming in the lake. The Hatchmere campaign was instrumental in the forming of the River and Lake Swimming Association, a group that promotes open water swimming in the United Kingdom. Wild swimming in Hatchmere has been banned by the lake's owners since November 2019.

Angling is permitted on the lake under the membership of Prince Albert Angling Society and anglers have purpose-built platforms from where they have to fish from which each requires a key provided by the society. Fish present in the lake include bream, tench, pike, roach as well as some breeds of carp.

In late 2020, a pair of Eurasian beavers were released into a fenced 10-acre enclosure at the northwest end of the mere.
