= Hunter's Wood Nature Reserve =

Nature reserve in Cheshire, England

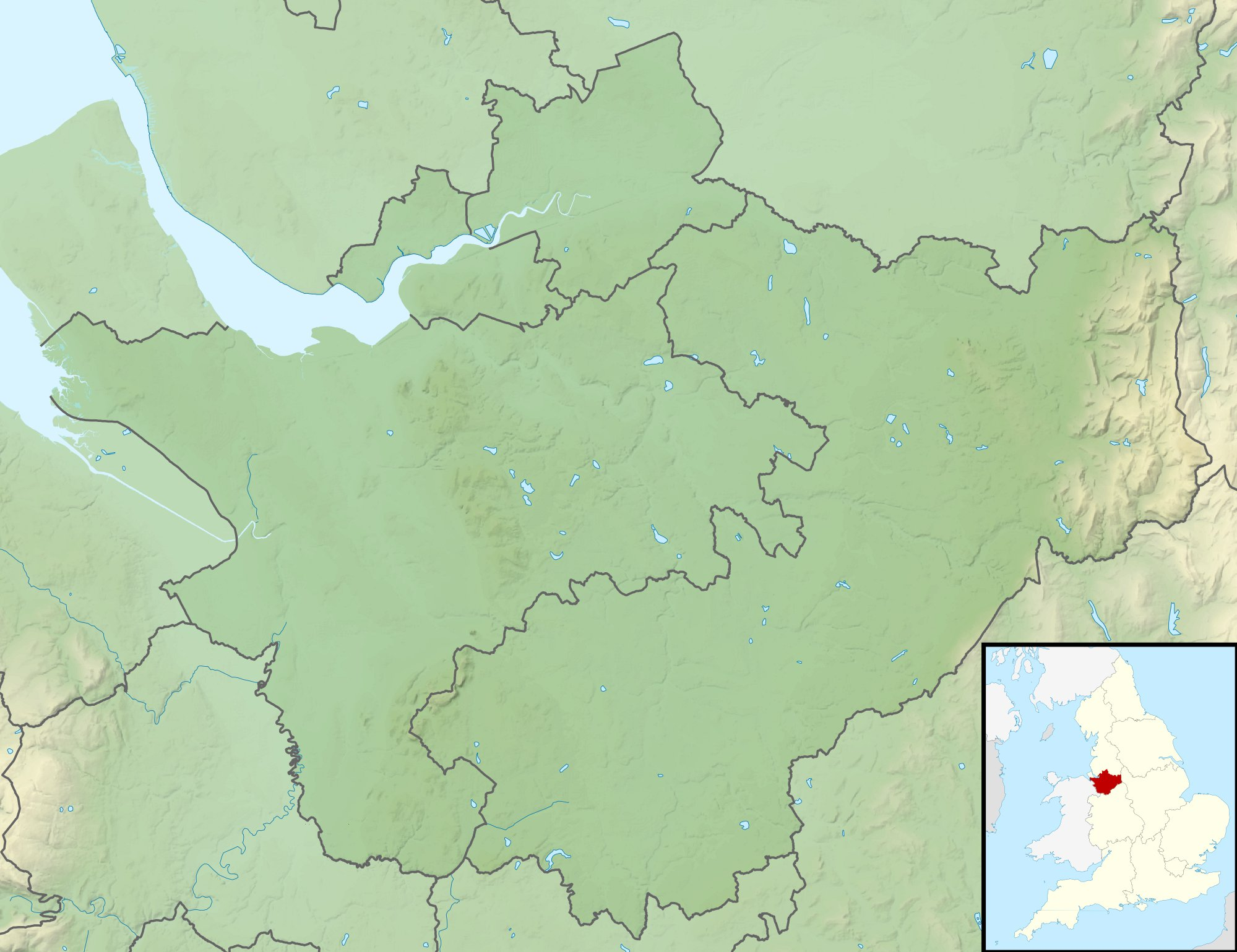
- Location within Cheshire
- Type: Nature reserve
- Location: Kingsley, Cheshire
- OS grid: SJ554763
- Coordinates: 53.282°N 2.671°W
- Area: 0.6 hectares (1.5 acres)
- Elevation: 15m
- Operator: Cheshire Wildlife Trust
- Open: any reasonable time

Hunter's Wood Nature Reserve is a nature reserve near Kingsley, Cheshire, England, managed by the Cheshire Wildlife Trust.

Hunter's Wood is a relatively new piece of woodland, originally planted on what was rough pasture on the southern bank of the River Weaver in 1999. There are small fragments of ancient woodland west, north and east of the reserve, some of them within the Warburton's Wood Nature Reserve, also managed by the Wildlife Trust. Hunter's Wood is intended to form a wildlife corridor linking these fragments, with the hope that specialist plants from the ancient woodland will eventually colonise. To this end, seeds were collected from surrounding areas and, in addition, 250 ash trees were planted.
