= Brookheys Covert Nature Reserve =

Nature reserve in Greater Manchester, England

Coordinates: 53.4095°N 2.3894°W

Brookheys Covert Nature Reserve is a Site of Special Scientific Interest and nature reserve managed by the Cheshire Wildlife Trust. It is located at SJ 742 904 in Greater Manchester.

Brookheys covert is an ancient semi-natural woodland dominated by oaks, with frequent ash, birch and rowan. Canopy cover varies throughout the reserve, and is at its most dense to the centre of the wood, away from the surrounding farmland. The understory is dense in places and is dominated by hazel, with frequent holly elder. Areas of bare ground and leaf litter are found throughout, and are associated with the most shaded parts of the wood. There are several inter-connected marl pit ponds present throughout the woodland. Some hold water while others remain as damp depressions, only holding water seasonally. Aquatic vegetation is limited to a small number of ponds, and includes common duckweed, iris and water violet. Most ponds are heavily shaded and are subject to fluctuating water levels, however, recent ditch and woodland management has helped improve their wildlife value.
