= Warburton's Wood Nature Reserve =

Nature reserve in Cheshire, England

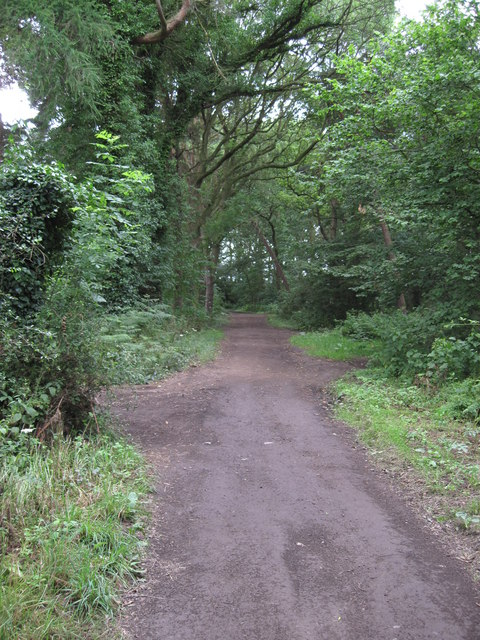

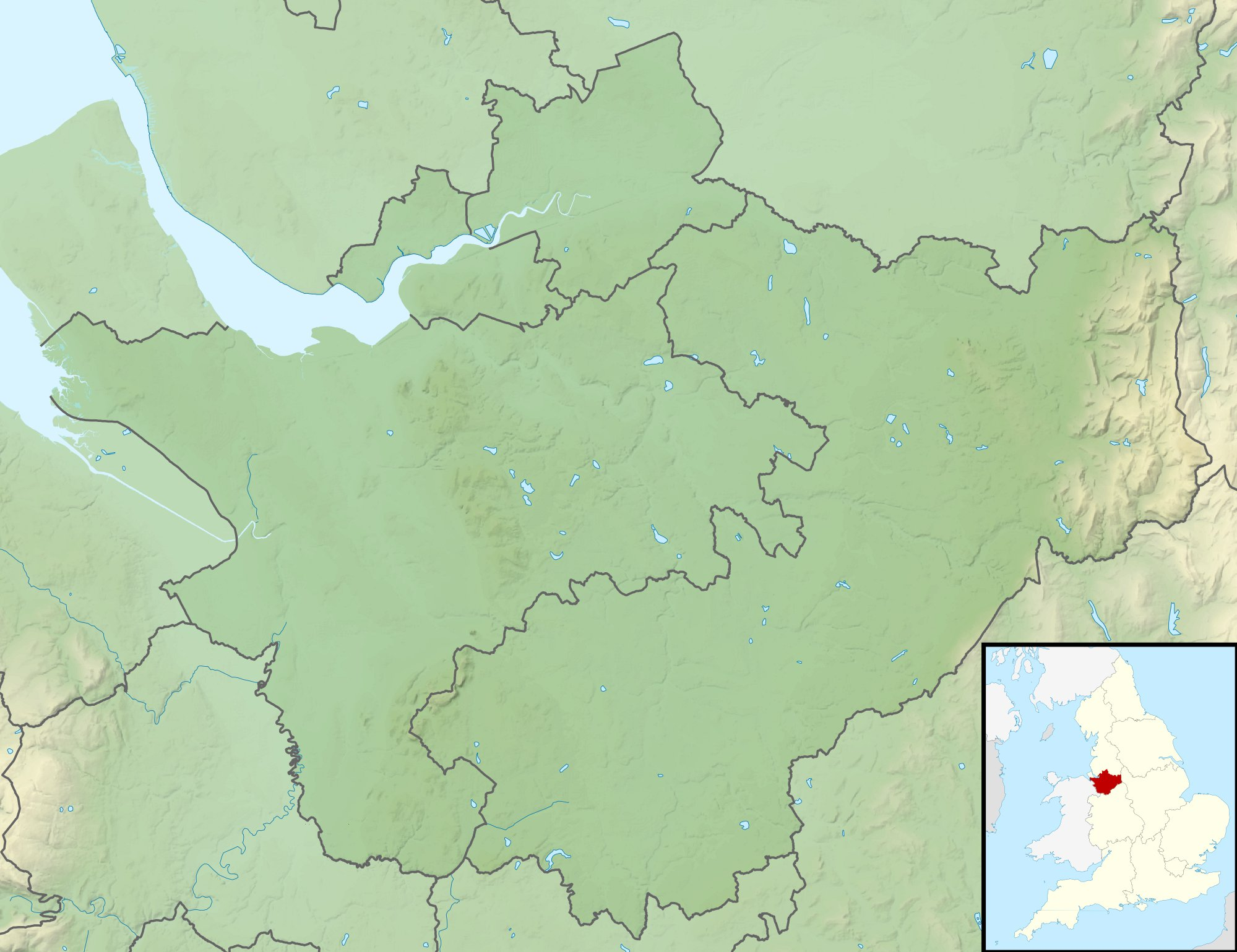
- Location within Cheshire
- Type: Nature reserve and SSSI
- Location: Kingsley, Cheshire
- OS grid: SJ555762
- Coordinates: 53.2813°N 2.6681°W
- Area: 3 hectares (7.4 acres)
- Elevation: 15 metres (49 ft)
- Operator: Cheshire Wildlife Trust
- Open: any reasonable time

Warburton's Wood Nature Reserve is a nature reserve near Kingsley, Cheshire, England, managed by the Cheshire Wildlife Trust.

The reserve consists of semi-natural woodland either side of a clough, or small valley, containing a tributary of the River Weaver. Together with Well Wood, a similar clough woodland to the east, it forms part of the Warburton's Wood and Well Wood Site of Special Scientific Interest, which covers a larger area of 8.1 hectares (20 acres).

Trees include familiar species such as pedunculate oak (Quercus robur), ash (Fraxinus excelsior) and hazel (Corylus avellana), but also small-leaved lime (Tilia cordata) and wild service-tree (Sorbus torminalis), which are uncommon in Cheshire.

The Wildlife Trust also owns the adjacent Hunter's Wood Nature Reserve, on which trees have been planted to act as a wildlife corridor, and with the hope that specialist plants from the ancient woodland will eventually colonise.
