= Dane-In-Shaw Pasture =

Protected area in Cheshire, England

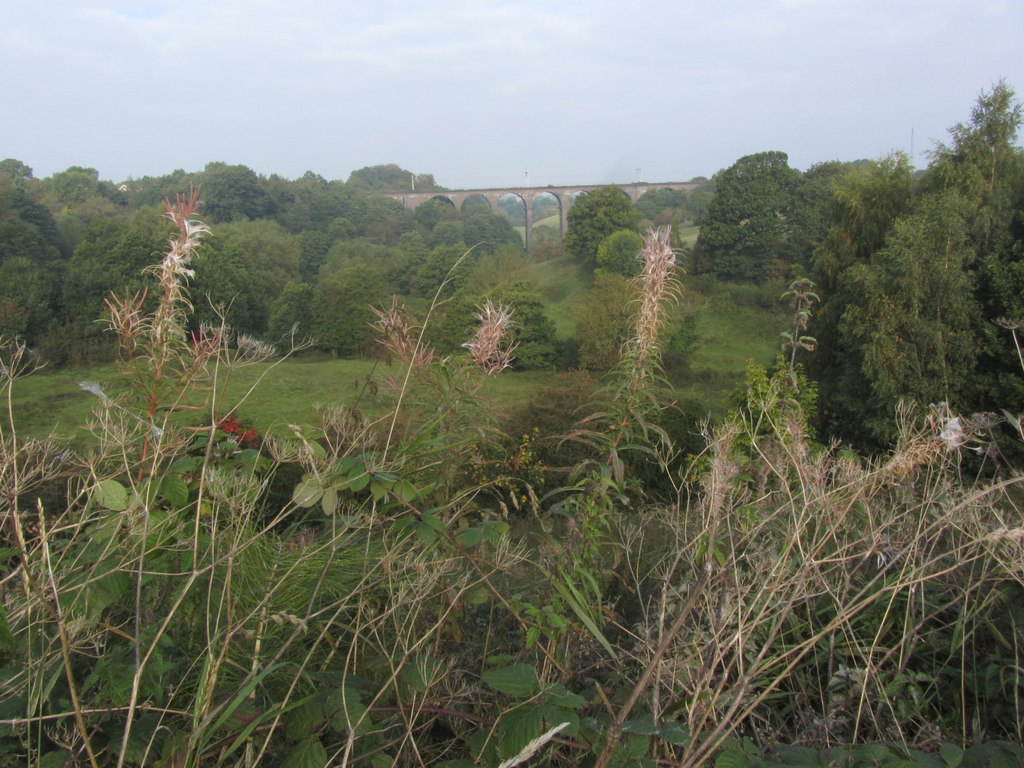
Railway viaduct near Dane-in-Shaw Pasture

Dane-in-Shaw Pasture is a Site of Special Scientific Interest (SSSI) in Cheshire, England. It is located on the eastern edge of the town of Congleton. The southern boundary of this protected area is near Macclesfield Canal. The northern boundary of this protected area is near the Stafford to Manchester Railway line. A stream called Dane-in-Shaw Brook flows through this protected area. This area of pasture is protected because of the diversity of plant species present.

Dane-in-Shaw Pasture SSSI can be accessed using the Biddulph Valley Way. This pasture has been publicised within the Coronation Meadows Project.

== Biology ==
Plant species in this pasture include common knapweed, oxeye daisy, yellow rattle, devil’s-bit scabious, meadowsweet, great willowherb, ragged-robin, water avens and common spotted-orchid. There are also patches of heather.

Butterfly species in this protected area include common blue and small heath.

== Geology ==
The substrates underlying this protected area include sands (including glacial sands) and bands of boulder clay. Meanders in Dane-in-Shaw Brook expose these different substrates.

== Land ownership ==
All land within Dane-in-Shaw Pasture SSSI is owned by the local authority.
