= Prince Albert Angling Society =

Angling club based in Cheshire, England

The Prince Albert Angling Society is a fishing club in England that is based in the County of Cheshire, founded in 1954 by a dozen anglers while fishing a local canal. In 2002 the Prince Albert had over 8,000 members with a 3–year waiting list, making it one of Europe's leading fishing clubs. The club oversees more than 200 waters, including still and river coarse fishing, Salmon and Trout fishing and even Sea trout fishing. The Prince Albert also allows groups to help maintain good standards of fisheries in return for off–season fishing tickets.

The president of the Prince Albert is William Bromley-Davenport ESQ. The 6 honorary life members are H.Ogden, J.A.Turner, J.T.Lovatt, C.Swindells, P.Gregory and R.Biddulph.
