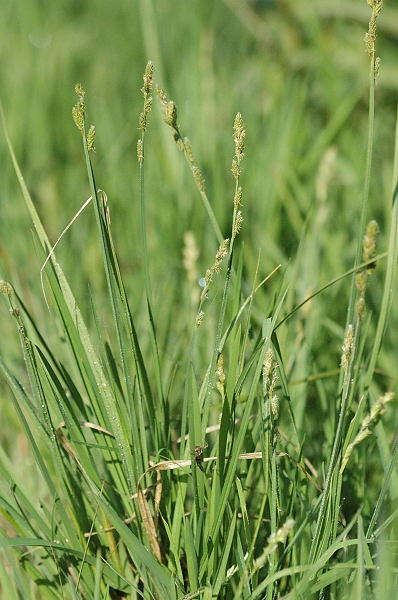

Scientific classification
- Kingdom: Plantae
- Clade: Tracheophytes
- Clade: Angiosperms
- Clade: Monocots
- Clade: Commelinids
- Order: Poales
- Family: Cyperaceae
- Genus: Carex
- Subgenus: Carex subg. Vignea
- Section: Carex sect. Canescentes
- Species: C. canescens

Binomial name
- Carex canescens L.

= Carex canescens =

Species of grass-like plant

Carex canescens L. (syn. C. cinerea Poll.; C. curta Gooden.) is a perennial species of plants in the family Cyperaceae growing in damp forests and wetlands. It is widespread across much of Europe, Asia, Australia, New Guinea, North America, Greenland and southern South America.

The plant has been found as an invasive species in Sphagnum peatlands disturbed by peat extraction in southern Patagonia.

Subspecies

- Carex canescens subsp. canescens – Europe, Asia, Australia, North America, New Guinea
- Carex canescens subsp. disjuncta (Fernald) Toivonen – eastern Canada, eastern United States
- Carex canescens var. robustior Blytt ex Andersson – Argentina, Chile, Falkland Islands
