= Little Budworth Common =

Protected area in Cheshire, England

Coordinates: 53.185873°N 2.6209996°W

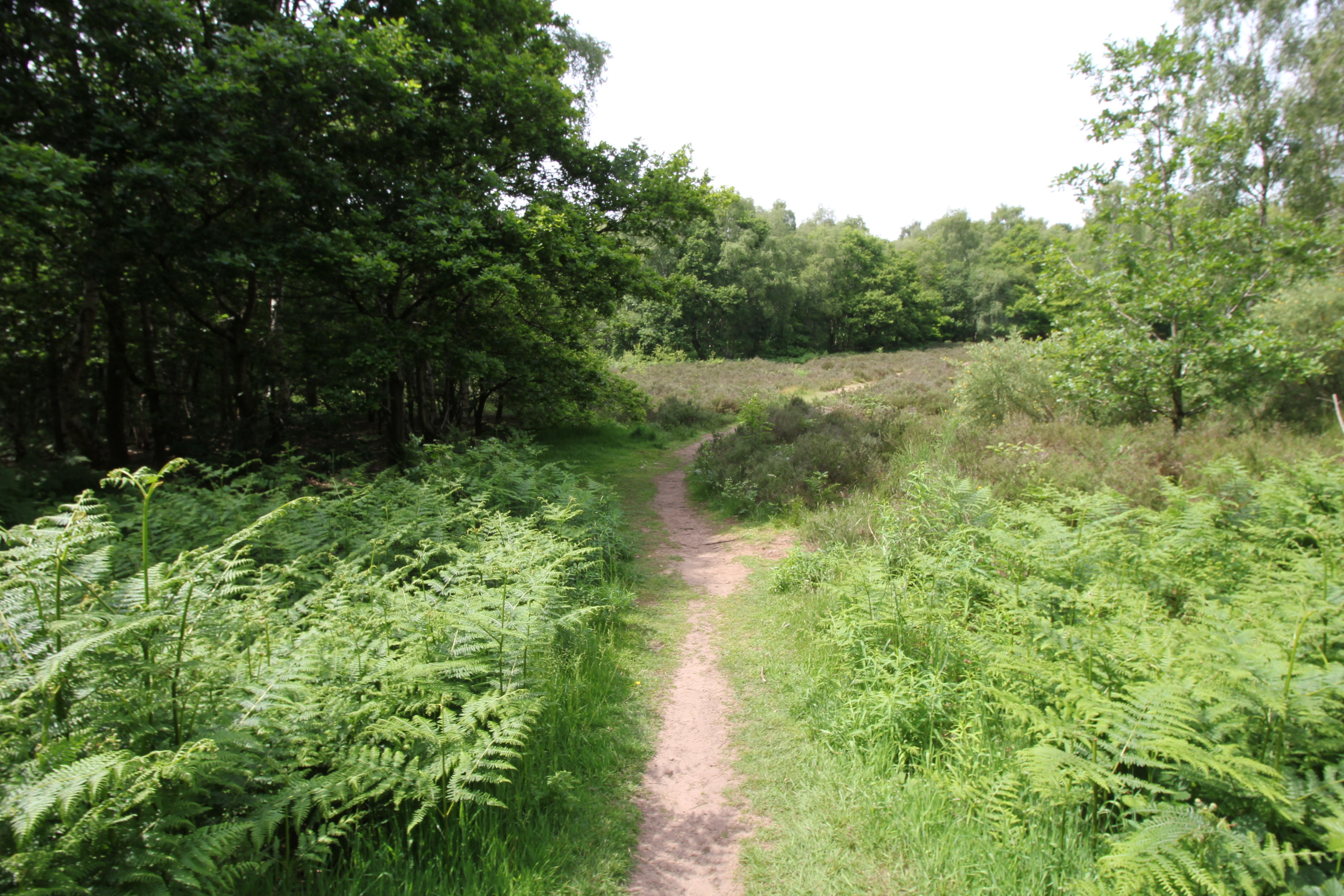
Little Budworth Common

Little Budworth Common also referred to as Little Budworth Country Park is a Site of Special Scientific Interest (SSSI) in Cheshire, England. It is located 5km west of the town of Winsford. This area is protected because of the lowland heath and bog habitats present.

Wooded areas have wooden carved artwork and children's play areas.

== Biology ==
The plants dominating dry heathland habitats are heather and bilberry. Other plant species include bell-heather, cross-leaved heath, gorse, harebell, cranberry and sundew. In wooded areas, tree species include pedunculate oak and rowan.

Research at Little Budworth Common has shown how growth of heather is affected by soil nitrogen.

== Land ownership ==
All land within Little Budworth Common SSSI is owned by the local authority.
