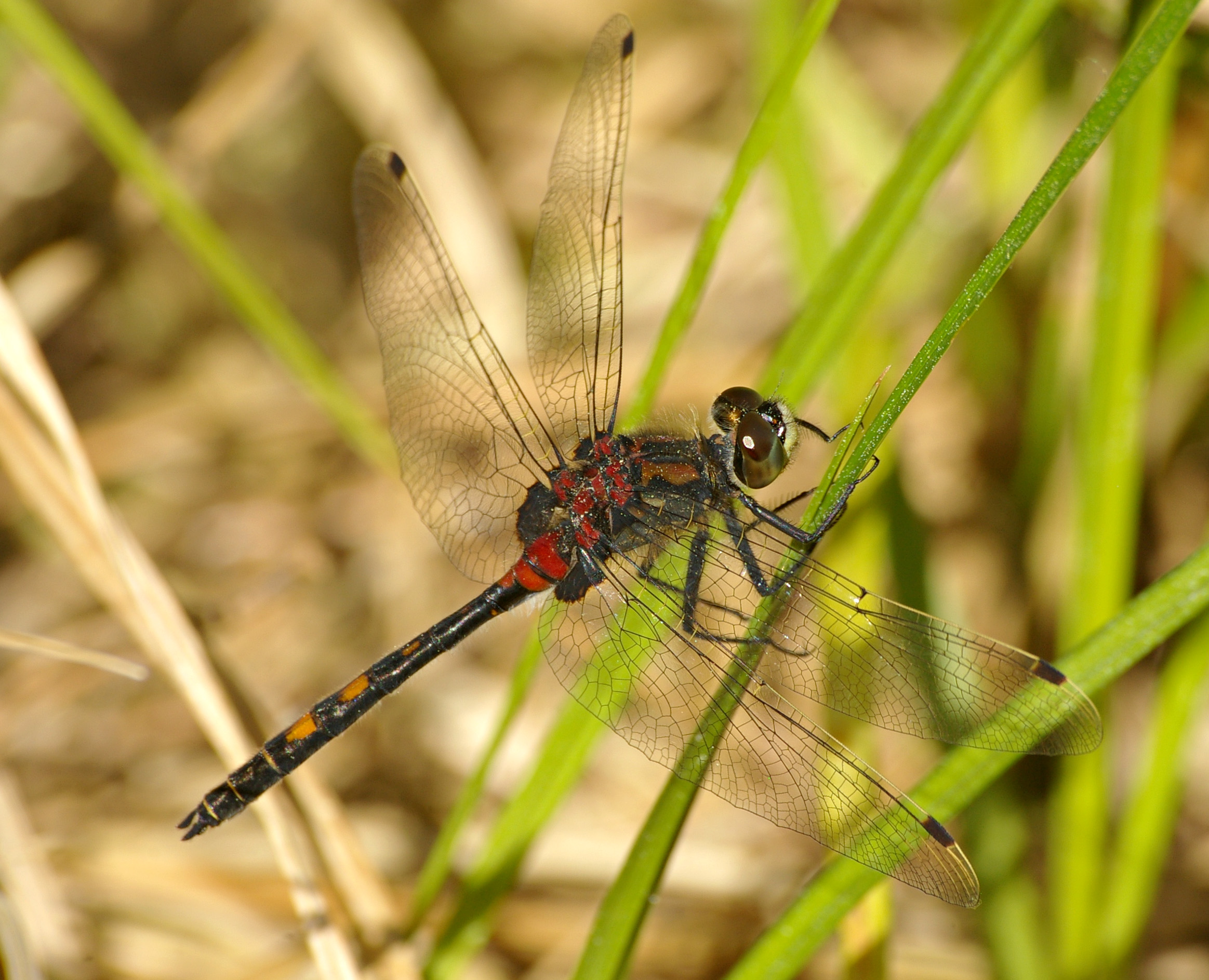
- Male
- Female

Conservation status
- Least Concern (IUCN 3.1)

Scientific classification
- Kingdom: Animalia
- Phylum: Arthropoda
- Clade: Pancrustacea
- Class: Insecta
- Order: Odonata
- Suborder: Anisoptera
- Superfamily: Libelluloidea
- Family: Libellulidae
- Genus: Leucorrhinia
- Species: L. dubia

Binomial name
- Leucorrhinia dubia (Vander Linden, 1825)

= White-faced darter =

Species of dragonfly

The white-faced darter or small whiteface (Leucorrhinia dubia) is a dragonfly belonging to the genus Leucorrhinia in the family Libellulidae, characterised by red and black markings and a distinctive white patch on the head. It is found in wetlands and peat bogs from northern Europe eastwards to Siberia, and the adults are active from around April till September, which is known as the "flight period". It breeds in acidic bodies of water, laying its eggs in clumps of sphagnum moss that provide a safe habitat for larval development. The larvae are particularly vulnerable to predation by fish, and so are usually found in lakes where fish are not present. L. dubia is listed as a species of least concern (LC) by the IUCN Red List, however, it is potentially threatened by habitat destruction, pollution, and climate change.

== Description ==
This species has a predominantly black body, usually 33–37 mm (1.3–1.5 in) in length - the abdomen is 21–27 mm (0.83–1.06 in) long and the hindwing is 23–28 mm (0.91–1.10 in) long. Mature males have striking red and orange markings on the abdomen and thorax which become darker with age, whereas young males and females have pale yellow markings. All individuals have a conspicuous white frons at the front of the head. The wings have a brown patch at the base and noticeable black pterostigma. It may be confused with similar species, including the black darter (Sympetrum danae), ruddy darter (Sympetrum sanguineum) and common darter (Sympetreum striolatum), however is usually distinguishable by its white face patch.

== Distribution ==
This dragonfly's range extends from western Europe to Japan, and it is commonly found in western, northern and eastern Europe at higher altitudes, but is rare in southern Europe and the United Kingdom. In recent decades, this species has been observed as far afield as Russia and China, however the vast majority of sightings have occurred in central and northern Europe. In Britain, the majority of individuals of this species are found in the highlands of Scotland, with key populations located in Inverness-shire and Ross-shire. In England, a few isolated populations occur in Cheshire and Cumbria, where biodiversity action plans have been set up to protect them, and as far south as Chartley Moss National Nature Reserve in Staffordshire. However, when British populations are considered overall, this species has been in decline over the past 35 years.

== Habitat ==
Adult individuals of L. dubia can utilise scrub and woodland habitat for roosting and foraging. The larvae require terrestrial areas of water, such as marshes, wetlands and peat bogs, that generally have vegetation growing at the water's edge. Peat bogs form a particularly important habitat, since they provide acidic conditions necessary for the growth of sphagnum moss, which provides a source of food and shelter.

== Life history ==
=== Larval stage ===
Like all other species of dragonfly, the larvae of this species grow by moulting (in which the exoskeleton is shed) several times during development. In the early stages of development, larvae preferentially inhabit sphagnum moss, which may provide a reliable source of food because the moss can trap organic matter that would otherwise sink to the bottom of the water. As well as fish, many waterfowl, amphibians, and other invertebrates will prey upon dragonfly larvae, so the mats likely also provide a safe hiding place from predators. The larvae are able to change colour depending on whether the moss they are inhabiting is brown or green, which would help to visually disguise them from predators. The acidification of ponds and lakes due to airborne pollution may in fact benefit L. dubia and other species that prefer acidic conditions, as this can result in a greater occurrence of sphagnum moss. Larvae will actively forage throughout both the day and night, however have been shown to capture more prey during the night. Larvae will also cannibalise their conspecifics, particularly in the absence of an abundant food source (zooplankton), and can be threatened by predation from other species of dragonflies. Larger individuals will generally cannibalise smaller individuals, and it is believed that this functions as a way of controlling population numbers.

The larvae generally do not thrive in environments where fish predators are present, and in some case appear to be more vulnerable to predation compared to other species of dragonflies, possibly due to their active foraging behaviour. An active foraging strategy means the larvae purposely swim to different parts of their habitat in search of prey, as opposed to a passive "sit and wait" strategy exhibited by some other species of dragonfly. They rely primarily upon visual cues to locate prey, and will consume anything that isn't too large or powerful for them to handle. They are therefore more likely to occur in areas of water where fish are absent. Since fish are less likely to occur in relatively smaller bodies of water, since these are at greater risk of becoming oxygen deficient during the winter, it has been suggested that adult dragonflies may choose where to lay their eggs by judging the size of a lake. The larvae have, however, been shown to exhibit phenotypic plasticity in the presence of predators, which means that larvae in danger of predation are able to grow longer dorsal and lateral spines as a defence mechanism.

=== Reproductive stage ===
Individuals of this species typically take 1–3 years to reach adulthood. The adults breed in acidic pools where sphagnum moss is present. The male holds a small territory near a body of water, and copulation with the female often begins over the water before they settle on the ground for about 30 minutes. The female drops the eggs amongst submerged moss or stems of cottongrass that grow along the edge of the water. Adult dragonflies emerge between May and early July in Great Britain; the exact timing depends on the latitude and weather. When the larvae have developed sufficiently and are ready to emerge as adults, they climb out of the water up a plant stem and shed their exoskeleton one final time. Males become sexually mature 4–12 days after emergence, and females a few days later; can generally be seen during their "flight period" from April till September.

== Conservation ==
=== Status ===
L. dubia is listed as a species of least concern (LC) by the IUCN Red List, meaning that it is not currently considered to be threatened by extinction. This categorisation applies to the species when all populations are considered across its entire range. However, it is red-listed in a number of European countries within its range, including Germany, Austria, Switzerland and the UK. Greater research and monitoring is currently required on population distribution and trends, to better understand how this species will fare in the future. Most of the recent scientific research has been conducted in central and northern Europe, and less is known about eastern populations in Siberia, where L. dubia is rarely seen.

=== Threats ===
L. dubia is vulnerable to alteration and destruction of its habitat, primarily due to water pollution, industrialisation, and development for agriculture. It is protected by the Wildlife and Countryside Act 1981 in the United Kingdom, where 95% of lowland peat bogs have been destroyed, and it is also covered by Biodiversity Action Plans in some British counties. Conservation reintroduction programmes have been shown to be a successful method for restoring populations to suitable sites, and in 2010 it was reintroduced to Witherslack Mosses in Cumbria, after 13 years of restoration management.

Isolated, fragmented populations are at an increased risk of local extinction due to a lack of exchange of genetic variation, resulting in potential inbreeding depression and increased impact of sudden, random events such as disease outbreaks. Populations of L. dubia in the UK, the Pyrenees and the Alps have been found to be more genetically distinct than other European populations, and may therefore be considered priorities for conservation, as they are likely to retain important genetic variation for adapting to changing climate conditions.

A rise in average annual temperatures caused by global warming could negatively impact L. dubia by allowing invasive species such as the scarlet dragonfly (Crocothemis erythraea) to occupy habitats further north of their natural range. Although the growth rate of L. dubia doesn't appear to be affected by temperature, C. erythraea can grow faster at higher temperatures, causing L. dubia to suffer higher levels of competition and mortality.

Due to the particular sensitivity of the larval stage to the presence of fish, this species could be threatened by the practice of artificially stocking lakes with fish for the purpose of recreational fishing. The process of liming acidified lakes, to increase their pH and restore fish populations, also poses a threat by reducing the amount of sphagnum moss present. Acidic lakes where fish are naturally absent could be of high conservation value for this species.
