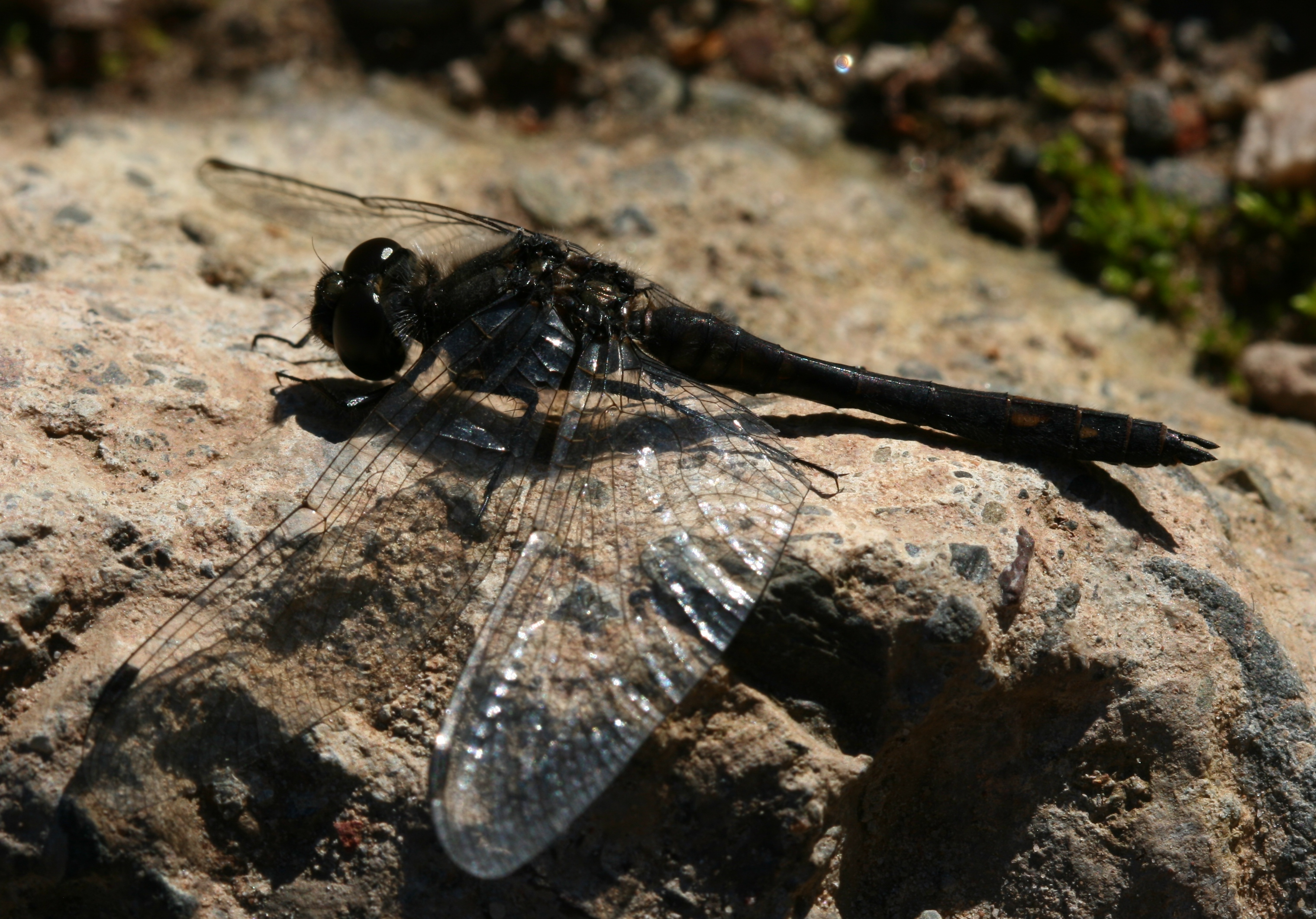
- Male
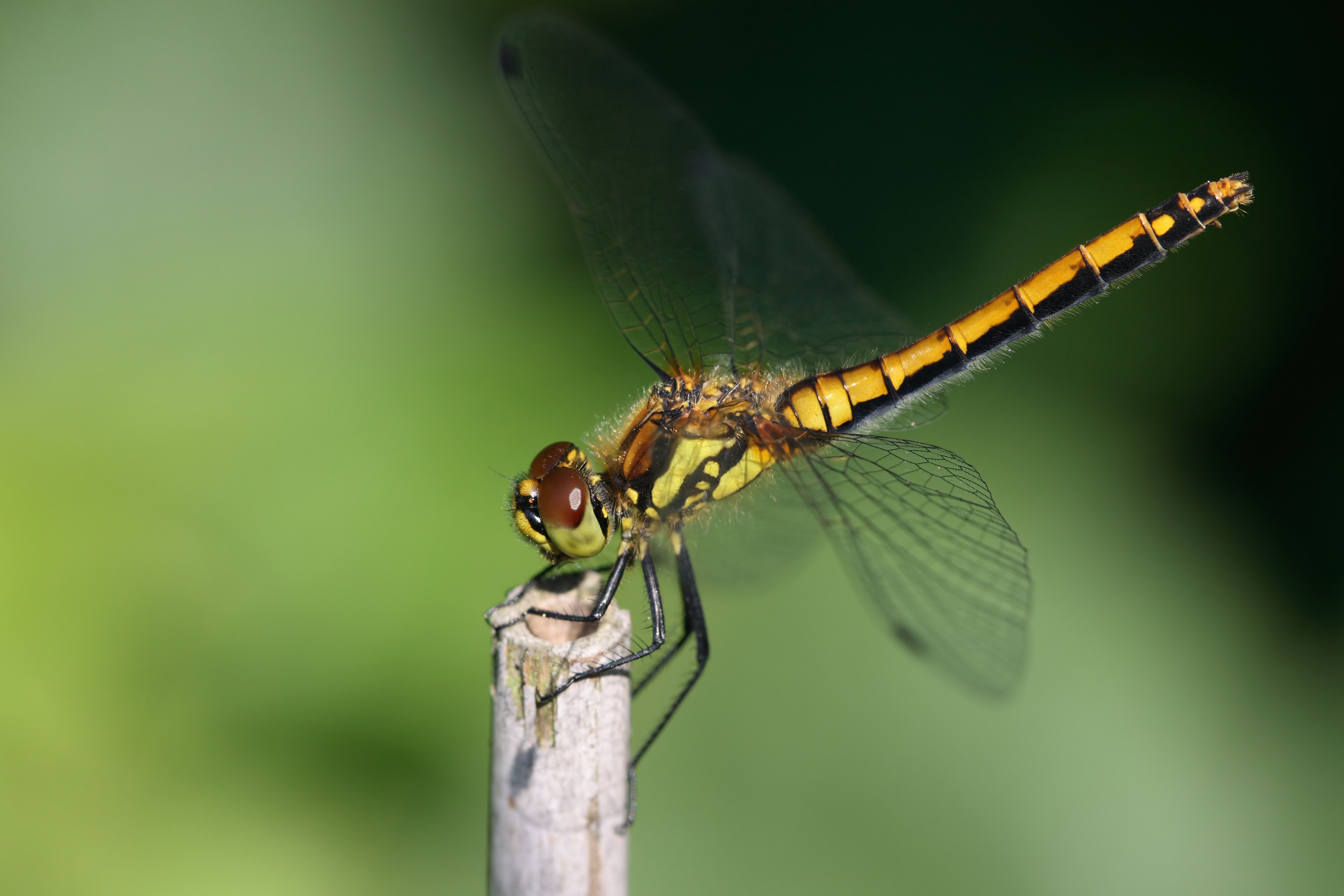
- Female

Conservation status
- Least Concern (IUCN 3.1)

Scientific classification
- Kingdom: Animalia
- Phylum: Arthropoda
- Class: Insecta
- Order: Odonata
- Infraorder: Anisoptera
- Family: Libellulidae
- Genus: Sympetrum
- Species: S. danae

Binomial name
- Sympetrum danae (Sulzer, 1776)
- Range of S. danae

Synonyms
- Libellula danae Sulzer, 1776; Libellula nigra Vander Linden, 1825; Libellula nigricula Eversmann, 1836; Libellula scotica Donovan, 1811; Libellula veronensis Charpentier, 1825; Sympetrum arcticum Matsumura, 1911; Sympetrum verum Bartenev, 1915

= Sympetrum danae =

Species of dragonfly

Sympetrum danae, the black darter or black meadowhawk, is a dragonfly with a northern Holarctic distribution in northern Europe, northern Asia, and northern North America. It is a very active late summer insect typical of heathland and moorland bog pools.

Members of the genus Sympetrum are known as darters in Europe, and as meadowhawks in North America.

== Description ==
At 29–34 mm (1.1–1.3 in) long and with a 20–30 mm (0.8–1.2 in) hindwing, it is one of the smallest species of Sympetrum, and Britain's smallest resident dragonfly. Both sexes have black legs and pterostigmata. The abdomen is narrowest near the base, widening towards the tip.

The male has a mainly black thorax and abdomen. In younger males, the thorax has three diagonal yellow side marks separated by a bold black panel, and the abdomen has yellow marks on the side, that darken with age; fully mature males are entirely black. It is the only species of Sympetrum with no red on the males.

Females and teneral (newly emerged) males are patterned black and yellow, with three diagonal yellow bars on the thorax and an extensively yellow upper side of the abdomen, becoming browner with age.

The wings are transparent with a network of fine black veins, and a small black bar on the front edge of each wing near the tip, and a very broad base to the hind wings. The flight is weak and fluttering compared to other Sympetrum species. Despite this, males in particular disperse widely, and may turn up far from suitable breeding habitat. Adults are present from mid June to mid November, with the peak period mid July to mid September.

== Breeding ==
This species is restricted to acidic shallow pools, lake margins, and ditches in lowland heath and moorland bogs, usually with bog-mosses and rushes. Eggs are laid in flight by dipping the tip of the abdomen into the water. The eggs hatch the following spring and the larvae develop very rapidly, emerging after as little as two months.

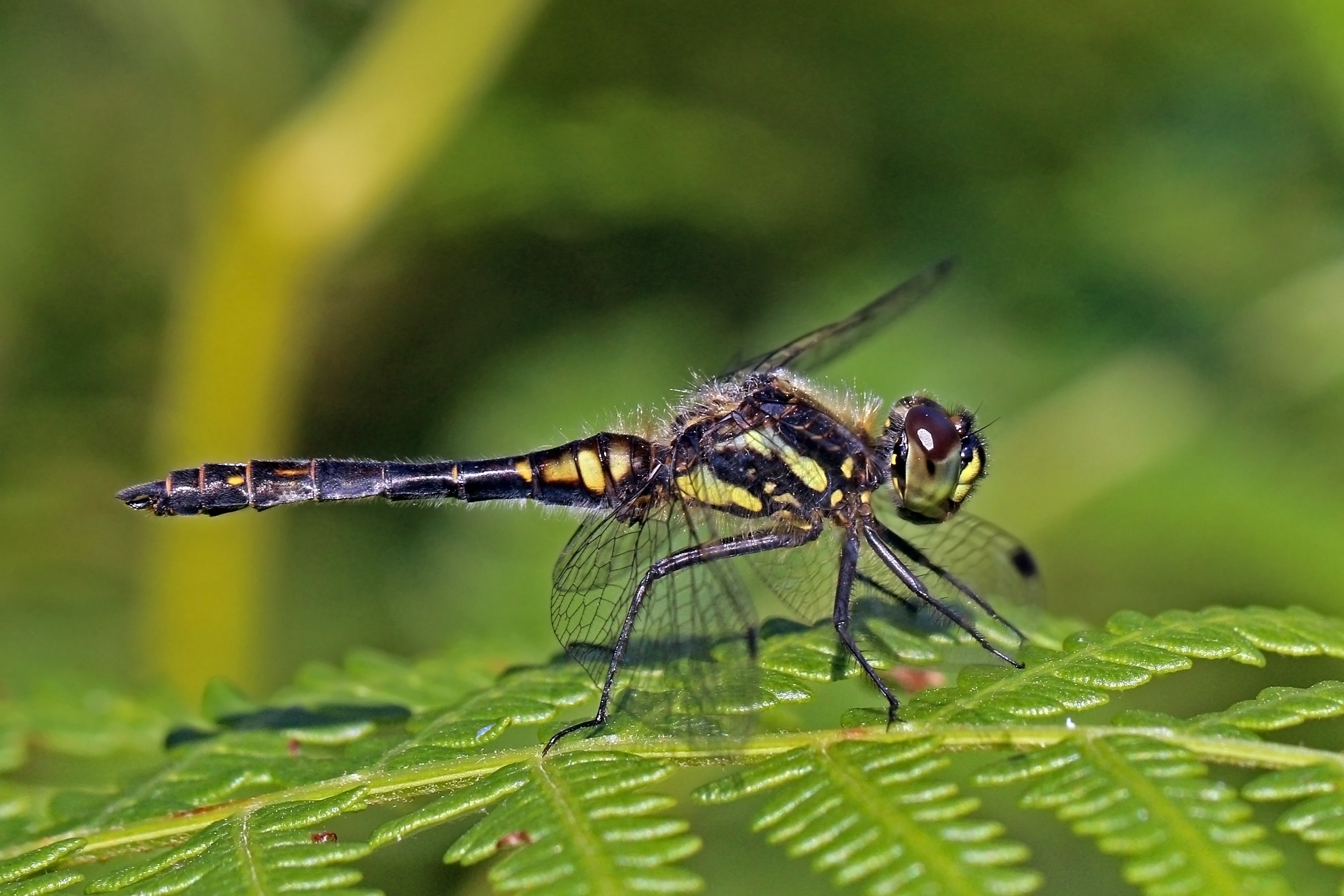
Recently emerged young male with extensive yellow still present

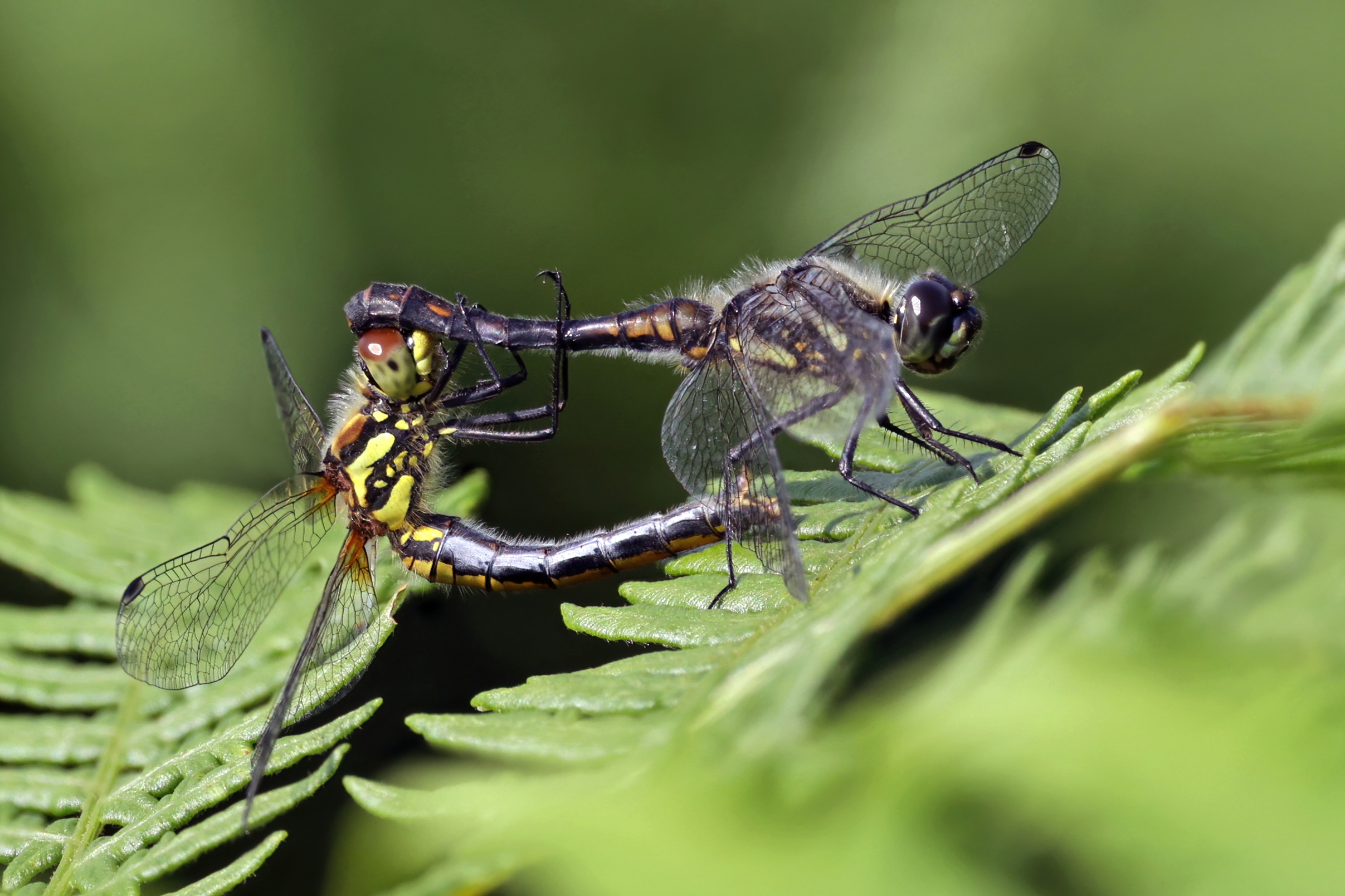
about to mate

Males basking in the sun

Females tend to choose where to lay their eggs based on the appearance of the site. Females also base the location of their oviposition on temperature. The females tend to gravitate more towards cooler climates rather than warmer climates. They are also likely to choose an oviposition site that contains little to no predators within the surrounding area.

== Population and conservation ==
In the British Isles, this dragonfly is very locally distributed in the lowlands, but is more widespread in the north and west, and in Ireland. It is locally very abundant on wet moorlands, and this could trigger dispersal. Records from the south coast suggest that immigration from the continent occurs. Its main threats are climate change with increasing temperature and irregular rainfall patterns damaging its bog habitats, development, drainage, agriculture, and peat extraction.

== Diet ==
The immatures feed on various organisms that can be found in aquatic environments. Some of their prey items include fly larvae, mosquito larvae, mayfly larvae, shrimp, and small fish. Adults feed on smaller, typically flying, insects, including mosquitoes, flies, moths, and mayflies. Much of their diet consists of insects from the order Diptera.

== Reproductive structures ==
One factor that distinguishes the female dragonfly from the male is the presence of two spermatheca, this trait is absent in males. Females also obtain spherical bursa copulatrix. Male dragonflies, on the other hand, possess copulatory organs that aid them during sperm competition. During this process, the males have the capability of removing the sperm of previous mates from the female and replacing it with their own sperm. Males can also be distinguished by their genitalia which is uniquely four-segmented.

== Development ==
The development of Sympetrum danae is divided into seven different phases. The first phase begins with newly developed eggs. When eggs are first laid they are white, but after approximately 18 hours, they become greyish. The second phase takes place four days later when the structure of the yolk alters. It is then followed by the third stage on the eighth day. During this stage, the germ plate becomes visible to the naked eye. The fourth stage occurs on the tenth day. This is when segmentation throughout the body becomes noticeable. Then, on the second week the fifth stage occurs. The eyes, mouthparts, and antennae develop during this particular stage. Many days later, on the 189th day, the sixth stage takes place and the embryo flips 180 degrees. Lastly, the seventh stage. This happens on the 197th day and it is when development is complete. The dragonfly typically hatches from its shell 217 days after it was oviposited.

== Female versus male activity ==
Males are typically more active in the morning hours. They spend most of their mornings in search of females to mate with. Their activity lessens in the afternoon. Females are the opposite; they tend to be more dormant in the early hours and more active at night. Males are likely to be more active near ponds and bodies of water. Conversely, females tend to be less active when near the water and prefer to be in areas with overgrown plants and grasses. Females typically only go to the water when they are in search of a mate or if they are laying their eggs. Unlike females, the males have two different types of flight, search flight and patrol flight.
