= Cheshire Wildlife Trust =

English wildlife conservation charity

Cheshire Wildlife Trust (CWT) was founded by volunteers in 1962 as the Cheshire Conservation Trust, and took its current name in 1991. It is one of 46 independent Wildlife Trusts in the United Kingdom. Its area covers Cheshire and neighbouring parts of Greater Manchester and Merseyside. That area is made up of Cheshire East, Cheshire West and Chester, Halton, Warrington, Stockport, Tameside, Trafford and Wirral.

== Background ==
The Trust's headquarters are at Bickley Hall Farm, near Malpas. The 210 acres (85 ha) organic working farm is also used as an education centre and for conservation grazing.

CWT is a charitable company, registered with the Charity Commission (no. 214927) and Companies House (no. 00738693). It is governed by a volunteer board of trustees, who are elected at its annual general meeting each November. As of 2026, the chief executive is Charlotte Harris and the chair is Charles Neame. Felicity Goodey has been president since 2011, and Richard Walker has been patron since 2020.

The Trust has around 17,600 members. In the financial year ending 31 March 2025, it employed 54 staff, was supported by about 550 volunteers, and had an income of about £4.3 million.

== Strategy and aims ==
The Trust's work is guided by a ten-year strategy to 2030, which it describes as a plan for a "Wilder Cheshire". The strategy is organised around three aims.

=== Bringing wildlife back ===
In line with the wider Wildlife Trusts movement, the Trust supports the "30 by 30" target of protecting and managing at least 30% of land and sea for nature by 2030. In the Cheshire region this would amount to around 90,000 hectares, compared with an estimated 5% of land currently managed for nature. Its other stated aims include doubling woodland cover in Cheshire by 2030 and restoring all of the peatland in its care.

The Trust is expanding the area of land it manages, often by buying sites of low wildlife value and restoring them. Recent acquisitions include Greenbooth, Aldred's Lea and Picton Pastures. Its species recovery work includes reintroducing the white-faced darter dragonfly to Delamere, keeping a family of beavers in an enclosure at Hatchmere, conserving natterjack toads at Red Rocks, and helping curlew and other wading birds in the south-west Peak District. It also runs a plant nursery that grows native trees and wildflowers for meadow and woodland creation.

=== Empowering everyone to take action ===
The Trust aims to involve individuals, schools, businesses, farmers and community groups in nature recovery. It cites research suggesting that action by one in four people can shift wider public behaviour. Programmes include a Wilder education network for schools and the Wild Network of community groups.

=== Responding to the climate emergency ===
The Trust promotes nature-based solutions to climate change. These include peatland, saltmarsh, fen and woodland restoration, natural flood management and tree planting. It campaigns for these solutions to be included in local planning and net zero strategies, and for a national Nature Recovery Network. Its marine work, carried out with neighbouring Wildlife Trusts, covers the Wirral coast, the Dee and Mersey estuaries and the Irish Sea.

== Nature Reserves ==
Cheshire Wildlife Trust manages 39 nature reserves totaling over 620 hectares, including:

- Abbots Moss
- Aldred's Lea
- Bagmere
- Bickley Hall Farm
- Blakenhall Moss
- Black Lake
- Cleaver Heath
- Cotterill Clough
- Crown Farm Nature Reserve
- Danes Moss
- Eastwood Nature Reserve
- Fox Hill
- Foxes Wood
- Gowy Meadows
- Greenbooth Nature Reserve
- Hatchmere
- Hockenhull Platts
- Holcroft Moss
- Hunter's Wood
- Intake Wood
- Kerridge Hill
- Knutsford Heath
- Limekiln Wood
- Marbury Reedbed
- New Ferry Butterfly Park
- Owley Wood
- Patrick's Wood
- Picton Pastures
- Poors Wood
- Pumphouse Wood
- Saltersford Farm Nature Reserve
- Saltersley Moss
- Sean Hawkins Meadow
- Swettenham Valley
- Thornton Wood
- Trentabank Nature Reserve
- Warburton's Wood
