= Naylor (surname) =

Naylor is an English surname. Notable people with the surname include:

- Benjamin Naylor (1830–1905), New Zealand gold rush-era merchant
- Bernie Naylor (1923–1993), Australian rules footballer
- Bo Naylor (born 2000), Canadian baseball player
- Brian Naylor (racing driver) (1923–1989), British racing driver
- Brian Naylor (broadcaster) (1931–2009), Australian broadcaster
- Charles Naylor (1806–1872), American politician
- Charles Legh Naylor (1869–1945), British composer and organist
- Christopher Naylor (disambiguation)
- David Naylor (born 1954), Canadian medical researcher
- Dillon Naylor (born 1968), Australian cartoonist
- Dominic Naylor (born 1970), English footballer
- Don Naylor (1910–1991), American radio personality
- Doug Naylor (born 1955), British writer
- Drew Naylor (born 1986), Australian baseball player
- Earl Naylor (1919–1990), American baseball player
- Edward Naylor (1867–1934), English organist and composer
- Emily Gaddum (née Emily Naylor, born 1985), English-born New Zealand field hockey player
- Glenn Naylor (born 1972), English footballer
- Gloria Naylor (1950–2016), American novelist
- Grant Naylor, pseudonym for collaborations of Rob Grant and Doug Naylor
- Guillermo Naylor (1884–1976), Argentine polo player
- Hattie Naylor, English playwright
- Henry Naylor (born 1966), British comedian
- Jac Naylor, fictional character in the television series Holby City
- Jack Naylor (1919–2007), American inventor
- James Nayler or Naylor (1618–1660), English Quaker leader
- Jerry Naylor (1939–2019), American singer
- Jimmy Naylor (1901–1983), English footballer
- Joan Naylor, mother of Richard Boyle, 1st Earl of Cork
- John Naylor (disambiguation)
- Josh Naylor (born 1997), Canadian baseball player
- Kenneth Naylor (1937–1992), American linguist and Slavist
- Lee Naylor (disambiguation)
- Lynne Naylor (born 1953), American animator
- Mark Naylor (born 1957), English high jumper
- Martyn Naylor (born 1977), English footballer
- Matt Naylor (born 1983), Australian field hockey player
- Mya-Lecia Naylor (2002–2019), English actress and singer
- Nick Naylor, fictional character in some of Christopher Buckley's novels
- Phyllis Reynolds Naylor (born 1933), American author
- Reg Naylor (1897–1945), Australian rules footballer
- R. H. Naylor (1889–1952), British astrologer
- Richard Naylor (born 1977), English footballer
- Rikki Naylor, True Blood character
- Robert Naylor (disambiguation)
- Rollie Naylor (1892–1966), American baseball player
- Scott Naylor (born 1972), English rugby league player and coach
- Sean Naylor, Canadian journalist
- Stuart Naylor (born 1962), English footballer
- Terry Naylor (born 1948), English footballer
- Thomas Naylor (1936–2012), American economist
- Thomas Naylor (politician) (1868–1958), British politician
- Tom Naylor (born 1991), English footballer
- Tony Naylor (born 1967), English footballer
- Walter Naylor (1891-?), British naval aviator
- William Naylor, British television producer
- Zoe Naylor (born 1977), Australian actress

== See also ==
- Nayler, surname
- Taylor (surname)
