= Nicholas Campion =

English astrologer and writer

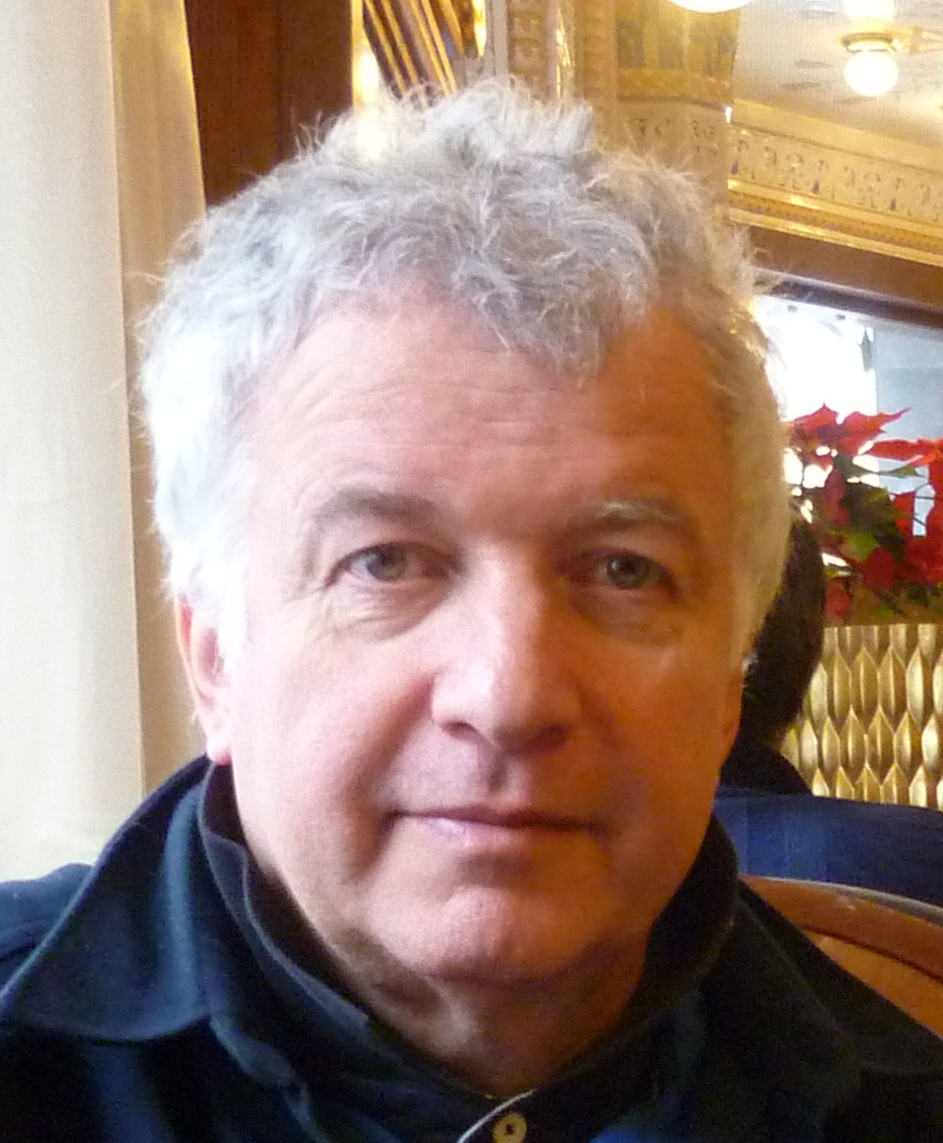
- Campion in 2010
- Born: 4 March 1953 (age 73); Bristol, England
- Education: Queens' College, Cambridge; SOAS; University of the West of England
- Scientific career
- Fields: History of astrology; Cultural astronomy
- Workplaces: Bath Spa University; University of Wales Trinity Saint David; Kepler College
- Website: www.uwtsd.ac.uk/staff/nicholas-campion//

Nicholas Campion (born 4 March 1953) is a British astrologer and historian of astrology and cultural astronomy. He is the author of a number of books and currently pursues an academic career.

== Career ==
=== Astrology ===
Campion is a former Daily Mail astrologer, where he took over from John Naylor, the son of R. H. Naylor, the first sun sign astrologer. He was president of the Astrological Lodge of London from 1985 to 1987 and of the Astrological Association of Great Britain from 1994 to 1999. He published a number of books on the practice of astrology between 1987 (The Practical Astrologer) and 2004 (The Book of World Horoscopes).

=== History of astrology and cultural astronomy ===
Concurrently with his activities as an astrologer Campion researched and published on the history of astrology and cultural astronomy. His book on millenarianism, The Great Year (1994), was described by Daily Telegraph journalist Damian Thompson as "a monumental study of historical schemes". In 1997 he founded the peer-reviewed journal Culture and Cosmos.

=== Academica ===
Campion is Associate Professor in Cosmology and Culture, Director the Sophia Centre, Principal Lecturer in the Institute of Education and Humanities, and programme director of the MA programmes in Cultural Astronomy and Astrology, and Ecology and Spirituality, at the University of Wales Trinity Saint David. In 2019 he became the Director of the University's Harmony Institute and edited The Harmony Debates, a collection of forty-two papers on the philosophy and practice of Harmony.

== Awards ==
- Marc Edmund Jones Award (1992)
- Prix Georges Antares Award (1994)
- Spica Award (1999)
- Charles Harvey Prize (2002)
- Regulus Award (2002)
- Regulus Award (2012)

== Bibliography ==
- Campion, Nicholas (1982). An introduction to the history of astrology. London: Institute for the Study of Cycles in World Affairs. ISBN 0-9508412-0-X.
- Campion, Nicholas; Baigent, Michael; Harvey, Charles (1984). Mundane Astrology. Wellingborough, Northamptonshire: Aquarian Press. ISBN 0-85030-302-8.
- Campion, Nicholas (1987). The Practical Astrologer.
- Campion, Nicholas; Jaine, Tom (1988). Cosmic Cuisine. Harper & Row. ISBN 9780062505590.
- Campion, Nicholas (1994). The great year : astrology, millenarianism, and history in the Western tradition. London: Penguin. ISBN 0-14-019296-4.
- Campion, Nicholas (2000). Zodiac: Enhance your life through astrology. Quadrille.
- Campion, Nicholas (2000). Astrology, history and apocalypse. London: Centre for Psychological Astrology Press. ISBN 1-900869-15-2.
- Campion, Nicholas (2001). Cosmos : a cultural history of astrology. London: Hambledon and London. ISBN 1-85285-257-7.
- Campion, Nicholas; Kollerstrom, Nick, eds. (2003). Galileo's Astrology. Culture and Cosmos. Cinnabar Books.
- Campion, Nicholas (2003). The Ultimate Astrologer: A Simple Guide to Calculating and Interpreting Birth Charts for Effective Application in Daily Life. Rider.
- Campion, Nicholas (2004). The Book of World Horoscopes. Wessex Astrologer.
- Campion, Nicholas (2006). What do astrologers believe?. London: Granta. ISBN 1-86207-838-6.
- Campion, Nicholas (2008). Horoscopes and Popular Culture, in Franklin, Bob (ed.), Pulling Newspapers Apart: Analysing Print Journalism. Oxford, England: Routledge. p. 253. ISBN 978-0-415-42555-1.
- Campion, Nicholas (2009). A History of Western Astrology Vol. 1: The Ancient World (first published as The Dawn of Astrology: A Cultural History of Western Astrology Vol. 1, The Ancient and Classical Worlds). London: Continuum. ISBN 978-1-4411-2737-2.
- Campion, Nicholas (2009). A History of Western Astrology Vol. 2: The Medieval and Modern Worlds. London: Continuum. ISBN 978-1-4411-2737-2.
- Campion, Nicholas (2012). Astrology and Cosmology in the World's Religions. New York, NY: New York University Press. ISBN 978-0-8147-1714-1.
- Campion, Nicholas (2012). Astrology and Popular Religion in the Modern West: Prophecy, Cosmology and the New Age Movement. Farnham, England: Ashgate. ISBN 978-1-4094-3514-3.
- Campion, Nicholas (2015). The Moral Philosophy of Space Travel: A Historical Review, in Jai Galliot (ed.), Commercial Space Exploration: Ethics, Policy, Governance (Abingdon: Ashgate; London: Routledge 2016), pp. 9–22. ISBN 9781472436115.
- Campion, Nicholas (2015). The New Age in the Modern West: Counter-Culture, Utopia and Prophecy from the late Eighteenth Century to the Present Day. London: Bloomsbury 2015. ISBN 978-1-4725-2279-5.
- Campion, Nicholas; Pimenta, F.; Ribeiro, N.; Silva, F.; Joaquinito, A.; Tirapicos, L. (2015). Stars and Stones: Voyages in Archaeoastronomy and Cultural Astronomy – a Meeting of Different Worlds. Oxford: British Archaeology Reports. ISBN 978-1-4073-1441-9.
- Campion, Nicholas; Silva, Fabio (2015). Skyscapes: The Role and Importance of the Sky in Archaeology. Oxford: Oxbow. ISBN 978-1-78297-840-4.
- Campion, Nicholas; Greenbaum, Dorian (2016). Astrology in Time and Place: Cross-Cultural Currents in the History of Astrology. Newcastle: Cambridge Scholars Publishing. ISBN 1-4438-8381-6.
- Campion, Nicholas; Rappenglück, Barbara; Rappenglück, Michael; Silva, Fabio (2016). Astronomy and Power: How Worlds are Structured. Oxford: British Archaeology Reports. ISBN 978-1-4073-1441-9.
- Campion, Nicholas (2016). Archaeoastronomy and Calendar Cities in Daniel Brown (ed.), Modern Archaeoastronomy: From Material Culture to Cosmology, Journal of Physics: Conference Series, Vol. 865, 2016, pp. 1–7.
- Campion, Nicholas (2016). Heavenly Discourses. Proceedings of the Heavenly Discourses Conference, University of Bristol, 14–16 October 2011. Lampeter: Sophia Centre Press. ISBN 978-1-907767-07-4.
- Campion, Nicholas (2017). The Importance of Cosmology in Culture: Contexts and Consequences, in Abraao Jesse Capistrano de Souza (ed.), Cosmology, InTech Open, pp. 3–17. ISBN 978-953-51-3209-7.
- Campion, Nicholas; Zahrt, Jennifer (2018). Astrology as Art: Representation and Practice. Lampeter: Sophia Centre Press. ISBN 978-1-907767-10-4.
- Campion, Nicholas; Impey, Chris (2018). Imagining Other Worlds: Explorations in Astronomy and Culture. Lampeter: Sophia Centre Press. ISBN 978-1-907767-11-1.
- Campion, Nicholas (2020). The Harmony Debates: Exploring a Practical Philosophy for a Sustainable Future. Lampeter: Sophia Centre Press. ISBN 978-1-907767-22-7.
