= John Naylor =

John Naylor may refer to:

- John Naylor (cricketer) (1930–1996), English cricketer
- John Naylor (organist) (1838–1897), English organist
- John Naylor (walker) (1844–1933), coauthor of From John o' Groat's to Lands End
- James Nayler (1618–1660), also known as John Naylor, English Quaker
- John Naylor (astrologer), English astrologer
- John D. Naylor (1893–1955), America athlete and college sports coach
- Little John, folklore character sometimes referred to as John Naylor or Nailer.
