= Antonius of Montolmo =

Antonius of Montolmo (Antonius de Monte Ulmi), died before 1396, was an author of astrological and magical texts.

== Biography ==
He was born in the 14th century, at Monte Olmo (Montolmo, Ulmi) in the Italian region of Picenum. He was doctor of arts, in philosophy and medicine. He lectured grammar at the University of Bologna in 1360. In 1384, he assumed the chair of astrology, which was occupied before by Cecco d'Ascoli, burned at the stake in Florence in 1327. Afterwards, in 1393, we find him as a professor of philosophy and medicine at the University of Padua.The following year he finished in Mantua a Treatise on how to construct horoscopes, a very important work for the 14th century, since it contained horoscopes of important historical figures, such as the emperor Charles IV.

== Magic ==
«The Cosmology of Anthony of Montolmo reproduces Aristotelian and Ptolemiac cosmologies, in the form which John of Hollywood elaborated in his Sphaera, and it took in account the Christian belief in a Paradise and Hell inhabited, respectively, by angels and demons. This vision is very composite in the sense that these angelic or demonic entities exert their influence according to their astrological position, but reside below the heavens, constellations and planets and are endowed with their own nature linking them to one of the sins, such as lust or gluttony. Far from being the engines of the heavens, they depend on them. In other words, Anthony brings about a singular syncretism between the astrological images of 'abominable' Hermetic magic, 'detestable' Solomonic angelic magic, the principles of Ptolemy's astrology and Christian demonology according to which demons are separated from the planets, in accordance with William of Auvergne's doctrine of 'natural' magic. ».

== Bibliography ==
=== Works ===
- Treatise on how to construct horoscopes (1394) : expanded edition by Regiomontanus in 1540 : De judiciis nativitatum liber praeclarissimus
- De occultis et manifestis, sive Liber intelligentiarum, edited and translated into English by N. Weill-Parot and Julien Véronèse, in Claire Fanger, Invoking Angels, University Park, Pennsylvania State University Press, coll. "Magic in History", 2011.
- Glosa super imagines duodecim signorum Hermetis, edited by N. Weill-Parot, "Antonio da Montolmo et la magie hermétique", in P. Lucentini, Hermetism from Late Antiquity to Humanism, Turnhout (Belgique), Brepols, p. 545-568.

=== Scholarship ===
- Thorndike, A History of Magic and Experimental Science, t. III, p. 602-610.
- Graziella Federici Vescovini, Le Moyen âge magique, trad., Vrin, 2011, p. 218-228.
- Nicolas Weill-Parot, "Antonio da Montolmo et la magie hermétique", in P. Lucentini et alii, Hermetism from Late Antiquity to Humanism (2001), Turnhout, Brepols, 2003, p. 545-568.
- ANTONIO da Montolmo. Dizionario Biografico degli Italiani - Volume 3 (1961), available online on: https://www.treccani.it/enciclopedia/antonio-da-montolmo_(Dizionario-Biografico)/
