= Restaurant Vermeer =

Coordinates: 52°22′35.56″N 4°54′2.28″E

Vermeer
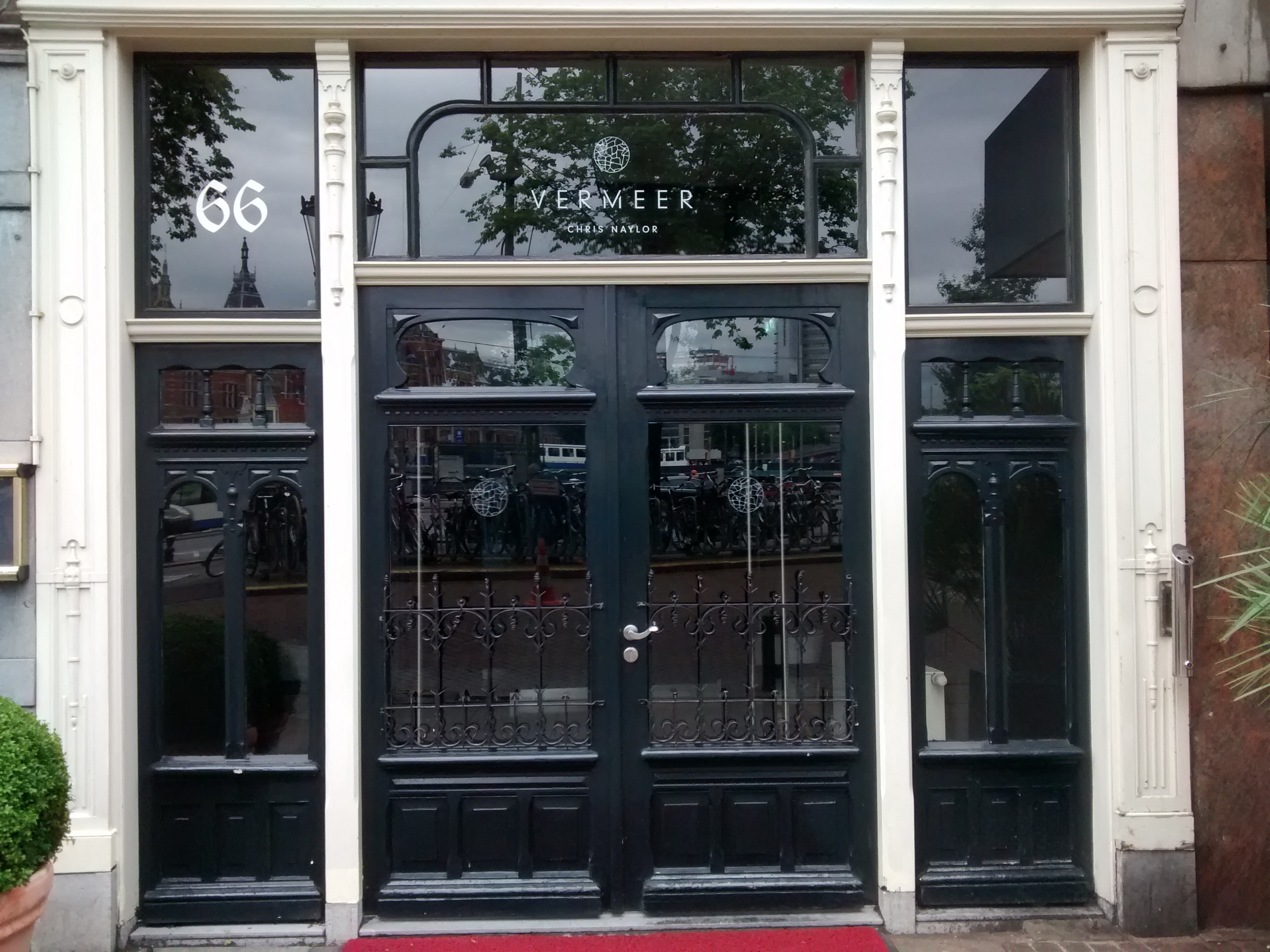
- Interactive map of Vermeer

Restaurant information
- Owner: NH Hoteles
- Head chef: Christopher Naylor
- Rating: Michelin Guide
- Location: Prins Hendrikkade 59-72, Amsterdam, Netherlands
- Website: http://restaurantvermeer.nl/en/

Restaurant Vermeer is a restaurant located in the NH Barbizon Palace hotel at the Prins Hendrikkade in Amsterdam, Netherlands. It is a fine dining restaurant that received its first Michelin star in 1993. It later lost and regained its star, then scored two stars in 2003.

The restaurant occupies (parts of) four of the nineteen 17th-century houses and fifteenth-century chapel that make up the NH Barbizon Palace hotel.

== Head chefs ==
Over the years Restaurant Vermeer had several Head chefs:

- Gert-Jan Hageman, 1993
- Ron Schouwenburg, 1994–1997
- Edwin Kats, 1997–2000
- Pascal Jalhaij, 2001–2004
- Christopher Naylor, 2004 – 2024
- Sebastian Baquero Garces, 2024 to present

== Star history ==
1993–2000: one star
2001: no stars
2002: one star
2003–2004: two stars
2005–2007: one star
2008–2010: no stars
2011–2012: one star

Because Michelin awards its stars to the head chef, a restaurant normally loses its stars when a head chef leaves.
