= Christopher Naylor =

Christopher Naylor may refer to:

- Christopher Naylor (actor), British actor
- Christopher Naylor (chef) (born 1970), British Michelin starred head chef
- Christopher David Naylor (born 1954), Canadian physician
