= Robert Naylor =

Robert Naylor may refer to:

- Robert Naylor (British Army officer) (1889–1971), British general
- Robert Naylor (actor) (born 1996), Canadian actor
- Sir Robert Naylor (hospital director), chief executive of University College London Hospitals NHS Foundation Trust
- Robert Naylor (walker) (fl. 1871), co-author with his brother of From John o' Groat's to Lands End
- Robert Naylor (priest) (died 1661), Dean of Lismore and later Dean of Limerick
- Robert W. Naylor (born 1944), American lawyer and politician
