= Listed buildings in Beeston, Cheshire =

Beeston is a civil parish in Cheshire West and Chester, England. It contains 19 buildings that are recorded in the National Heritage List for England as designated listed buildings. The major building in the parish is Beeston Castle, the rest of the parish being rural. The listed buildings consist of the castle and its associated structures, farms and farm buildings, houses and associated structures, and a hotel.

== Key ==
| Grade | Criteria |
|---|---|
| Grade I | Buildings of exceptional interest, sometimes considered to be internationally important. |
| Grade II* | Particularly important buildings of more than special interest. |
| Grade II | Buildings of national importance and special interest. |

== Buildings ==
| Name and location | Photograph | Date | Notes | Grade |
|---|---|---|---|---|
| Inner bailey, Beeston Castle; 53.12854°N 2.69349°W | | c. 1220 | Built for Ranulf de Blondeville, 6th Earl of Chester, the sandstone castle was damaged in the Civil War. Remaining are the gatehouse with its D-shaped towers, and parts of the curtain walls and its incorporated D-shaped towers. The structure is under the care of English Heritage, and the whole site is a scheduled monument. | I |
| Outer bailey, Beeston Castle; 53.12768°N 2.69015°W | | c. 1220 | Built for Ranulf de Blondeville, 6th Earl of Chester, the sandstone castle was damaged in the Civil War. Remaining are the lower courses of the outer bailey. These include the remains of the towers and walls, with a gap at the site of the former gatehouse. The structure is under the care of English Heritage, and the whole site is a scheduled monument. | I |
| Brook Farm Cottage; 53.1229°N 2.6845°W | | Late 16th to early 17th century | This is a timber-framed house with whitewashed brick infill and a tiled roof. It is in two storeys, the upper floor being gabled and jettied. The windows consist of casements, mullioned and transomed windows, and dormers. | II* |
| Smithy Cottage; 53.1234°N 2.6864°W | | Early to mid-17th century | This is a timber-framed cottage with rendered brick infill and a tiled roof, standing on a stone plinth. It is in two storeys. The windows in the lower storey are casements, and those in the upper storey are gabled dormers. | II |
| Barn, Brook Farm; 53.1226°N 2.6841°W | — | 17th century | The barn is timber-framed with rendered brick infill and has a tiled roof. It stands on a stone and brick plinth. It contains stable doors, a gabled loft door, and casement windows. | II |
| Beech Tree Cottage; 53.1249°N 2.6882°W | | 17th century | The cottage was extended in the 19th century. The original portion is timber-framed with brick infill and a tiled roof, standing on a stone plinth. The 19th-century wing has a stone lower storey and a timber-framed upper storey. In the entrance front of the original portion is a canted oriel window with a canted hipped roof. Elsewhere are casement windows and dormers. | II |
| Brook Cottage; 53.1229°N 2.6845°W | | 17th century | A timber-framed cottage with brick infill and a tiled roof, standing on a stone plinth. It is in two storeys, and has a T-shaped plan. To the right of the main wing is another, gabled, wing. The windows are casements and dormers. | II |
| Cottage near Gamekeeper's Cottage; 53.1191°N 2.7032°W | — | 17th century | The cottage is timber-framed with whitewashed brick infill and a slate roof. It is in two storeys. The entrance front contains a doorway, three casement windows on the ground floor and two dormers on the upper floor. At the rear are two doorways, two casements in the lower floor, and another casement and a dormer in the upper floor. | II |
| Gamekeeper's Cottage; 53.1195°N 2.7030°W | — | 17th century | A timber-framed house with whitewashed brick infill and a tiled roof, standing on a stone plinth. The left gable end is in brick. The entrance front contains a door to the right of centre, a casement window on each side of it and two gabled dormers above. | II |
| Moathouse; 53.1206°N 2.6967°W | | 17th century | This is a two-storey timber-framed farmhouse with whitewashed brick infill and a tiled roof. A left wing was added in the 19th century; the lower storey is in stone, and the upper storey is partly timber framed, and partly painted to resemble timber-framing. The windows in the lower storey are casements, and those in the upper storey are gabled dormers. | II |
| Horsley Lane Farmhouse; 53.1198°N 2.7018°W | — | 1664 | The farmhouse is timber-framed with whitewashed brick infill and a slate roof. It is in two storeys with casement windows on the lower floor, and gabled dormers above. To the left is a 20th-century brick extension painted to resemble timber framing, and to the right is a 19th-century timber-framed lean-to. | II |
| Yew Tree Farmhouse; 53.1191°N 2.6718°W | | Late 17th century | The farmhouse is timber-framed with whitewashed and rendered brick infill. It has a corrugated iron roof, and is in two storeys. In the entrance front is a doorway and a gabled dormer. The other windows are casements. | II |
| Bathing pool and well, Bath Garden Cottage; 53.12057°N 2.69833°W | — | 1684 | The bathing pool is square, constructed in red ashlar sandstone, and surrounded by sandstone paving. At one corner are stone steps, and diagonally opposite is a water spout. To the side of the pool is a rectangular well, also with steps leading down into it. In an adjacent rockery is a rectangular datestone. | II |
| Bath Garden Cottage; 53.1207°N 2.6983°W | | Early 18th century | The cottage was extended in the middle of the 19th century. It is timber-framed with brick infill and has a slate roof. The cottage is in two storeys, with a symmetrical two-bay entrance front. The windows are casements and gabled semi-dormers. | II |
| Castleside Cottage; 53.1252°N 2.6885°W | | 18th century | The cottage is constructed in whitewashed stone rubble with a tiled roof. It is in a single storey with an attic, and has a symmetrical entrance front in three bays. There is a central door, flanked by casement windows. | II |
| Lodge, Beeston Castle; 53.12677°N 2.68881°W | | 1846 | This was built for the Peckforton estate, and consists of a two-storey sandstone gateway. In the centre is a pointed arch, which is flanked by two circular towers on each side in bartizan style. | II |
| Castleside Farmhouse; 53.1260°N 2.6941°W | — | c. 1860 | The farmhouse is in brick with a tile roof. It has two storeys with timber-framed gables. The entrance front is in three bays. To the left of centre is a timber-framed gabled porch. The windows are casements. | II |
| Bathing house 53.12047°N 2.69806°W | — | Late 19th century | The bathing house is constructed in stone, brick and timber framing, and has two storeys. To the left of this is a timber-framed hut, also in two storeys, with a ground floor loggia containing a pumping house. | II |
| Wild Boar Inn; 53.1276°N 2.6620°W | | c. 1895 | This originated as a country house named Beeston Towers, which was timber-framed with jettying. Repeated additions and alterations were made during the 20th century in rendered brick. The building was used at one time as a school, and later converted into a public house, restaurant and hotel. It is a complex building, with features including much decorative timber-work, a tower, a lantern, and an octagonal belvedere. Some windows are mullioned or mullioned and transomed, and others are oriel windows. | II |

== See also ==
- Listed buildings in Peckforton
- Listed buildings in Burwardsley
- Listed buildings in Tattenhall
- Listed buildings in Foulk Stapleford
- Listed buildings in Tiverton
- Listed buildings in Bunbury
- Listed buildings in Spurstow
