= Beeston Castle =

Former Royal castle in Beeston, Cheshire, England

- Part of Cheshire
- Beeston, England
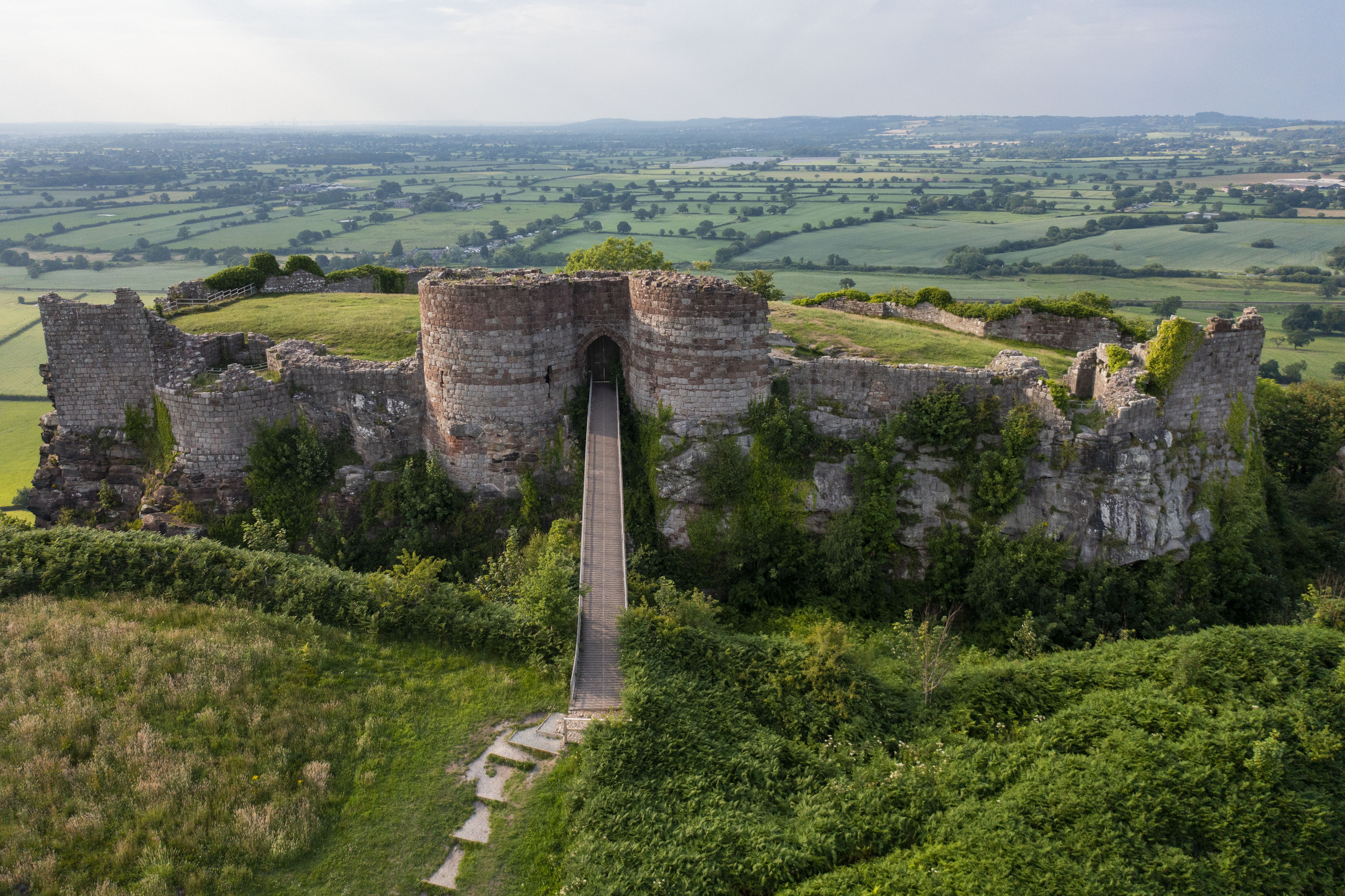
- Beeston Castle inner ward in 2025.

Location map and quick summary
Site information
Type	Enclosure castle
Owner	English Heritage
Condition	Ruin
Location
Location within Cheshire
Coordinates	53.1277°N 2.6913°W
Height	9 metres (30 ft)
Site history
Built	c. 1220
Built by	Ranulf de Blondeville
In use	Open to public
Materials	Sandstone
Demolished	1646
Events	Welsh Wars; English Civil War

Beeston Castle is a former Royal castle in Beeston, Cheshire, England (grid reference SJ537593), perched on a rocky sandstone crag 350 feet (107 m) above the Cheshire Plain. It was built in the 1220s by Ranulf de Blondeville, 6th Earl of Chester (1170–1232), on his return from the Crusades. In 1237, Henry III took over the ownership of Beeston, and it was kept in good repair until the 16th century, when it was considered to be of no further military use, although it was pressed into service again in 1643, during the English Civil War. The castle was slighted (partly demolished) in 1646, in accordance with Cromwell's destruction order, to prevent its further use as a bastion. During the 18th century, parts of the site were used as a quarry.

The castle is a Scheduled Ancient Monument owned and managed by English Heritage. The walls of the outer bailey and the gatehouse and curtain walls of the inner bailey are recorded separately in the National Heritage List for England as designated Grade I listed buildings. A legend states that the royal treasure of Richard II was buried in the castle grounds but many searches have failed to discover the hoard.

== Location ==
The castle is built on Beeston Crag, which is in the southerly part of the Mid Cheshire Ridge, a chain of low sandstone hills that stretches from the River Mersey down to the central region of the Cheshire Plain. The low-lying area between the southerly and the northern ranges of the ridge is known as the Beeston Gap. It was formed by a meltwater channel at the end of the Ice age.

The crag, just like the neighbouring Peckforton Hills, is part of a thicker sequence known as the New Red Sandstone. It was formed from easterly dipping layers of Triassic sandstone. The lower slopes are formed from Wilmslow Sandstone Formation while the upper strata are part of the Helsby Sandstone Formation, which is around 245 million years old. The hillock is capped by a small outcrop of sandstones assigned to the Tarporley Siltstone Formation (and formerly known as the Keuper Waterstones). Both types of sandstones were once quarried at multiple sites within the castle grounds.

Along the eastern margin of the hill is the Peckforton Fault, a major north–south-aligned geological fault which downthrows the strata to the east. A low ridge of glacial moraine extending east from the castle lodge is interpreted as marking an ice front during the retreat (or stagnation in situ) of the Irish Sea ice sheet which had invaded Cheshire from the northwest during the last ice age.

== Prehistory ==
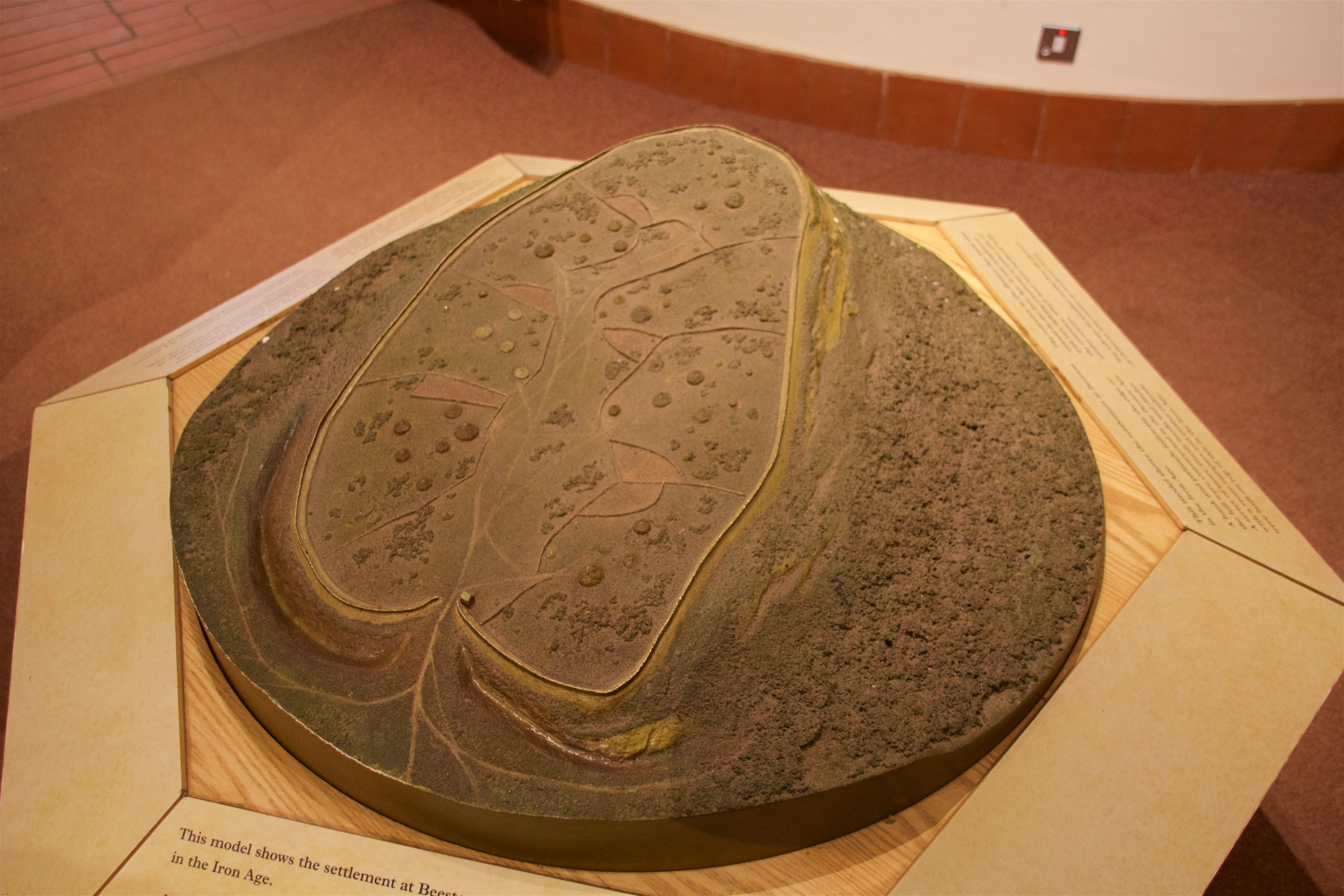
A model showing Beeston's Iron Age settlement

Pits dating from the 4th millennium BC indicate that the site of Beeston Castle was inhabited or used as a communal gathering place during the Neolithic period. Archaeologists have discovered Neolithic flint arrow heads on the crag, as well as the remains of a Bronze Age community, and of an Iron Age hill fort. The rampart associated with the Bronze Age activity on the crag has been dated to around 1270–830 BC; seven circular buildings were identified as being either late Bronze Age or early Iron Age in origin. It may have been a specialist metalworking site.

== History ==
=== Construction ===
Beeston was built for Ranulf de Blondeville, 6th Earl of Chester, in the early 13th century. The siting of the castle's outer bailey walls was chosen to take advantage of the fortifications remaining from the earlier Iron Age rampart. In medieval documents the castle is described as Castellum de Rupe, the Castle on the Rock. It is one of three major castles built by Ranulph in the 1220s, shortly after his return from the Fifth Crusade. The others are Bolingbroke in Lincolnshire, and Chartley, Staffordshire, both of which share similar architectural features with Beeston; in particular the design of the towers.

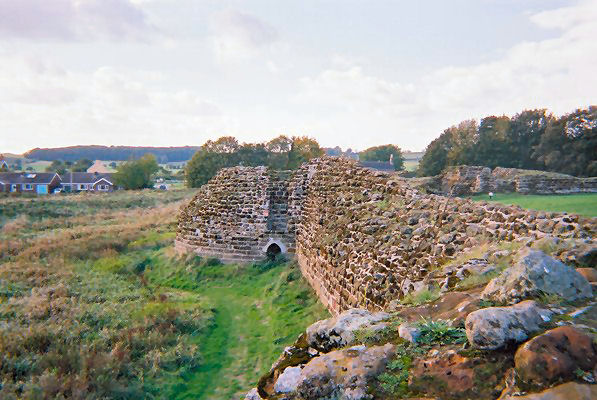
Ruins of Bolingbroke Castle

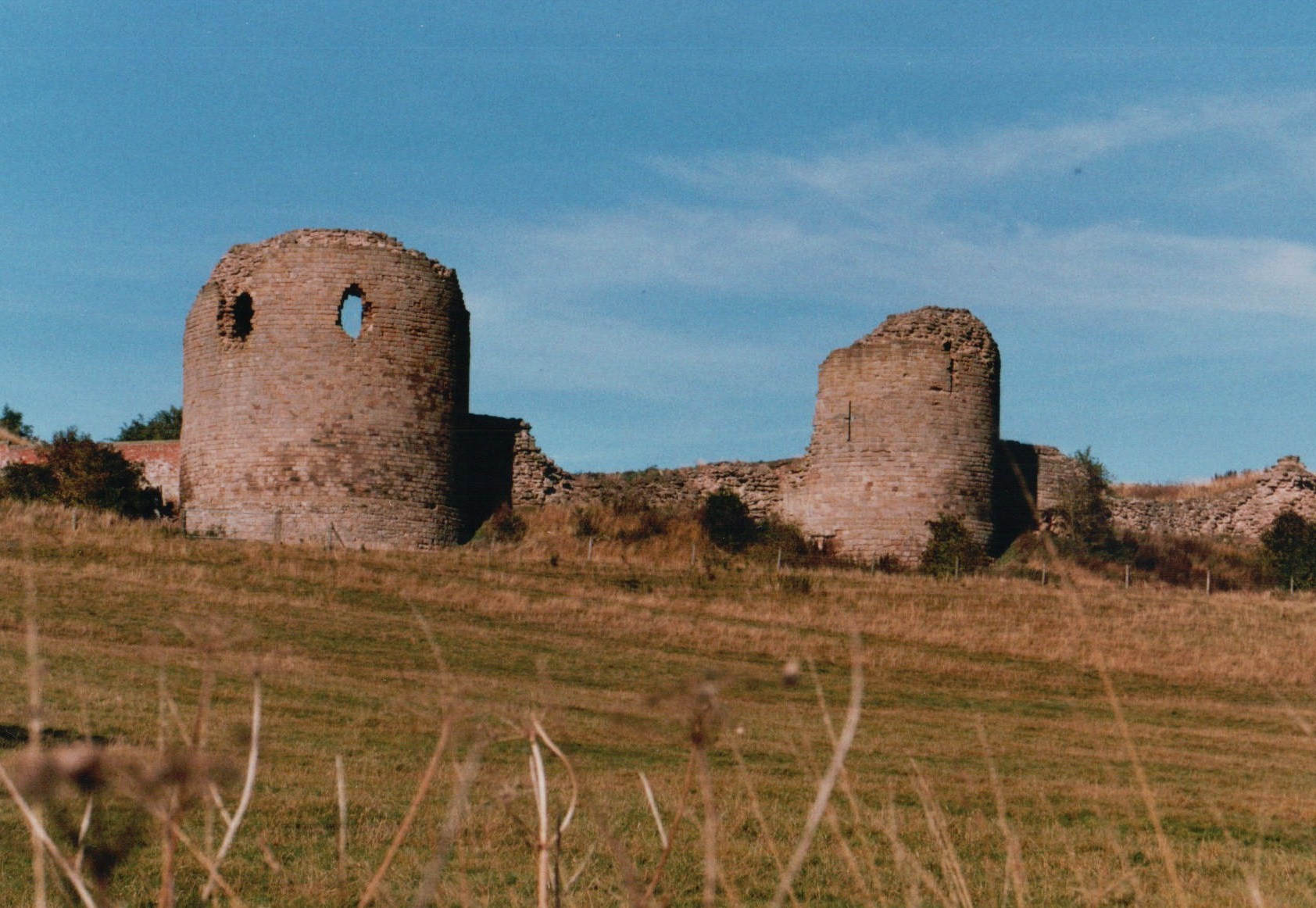
Ruins of Chartley Castle

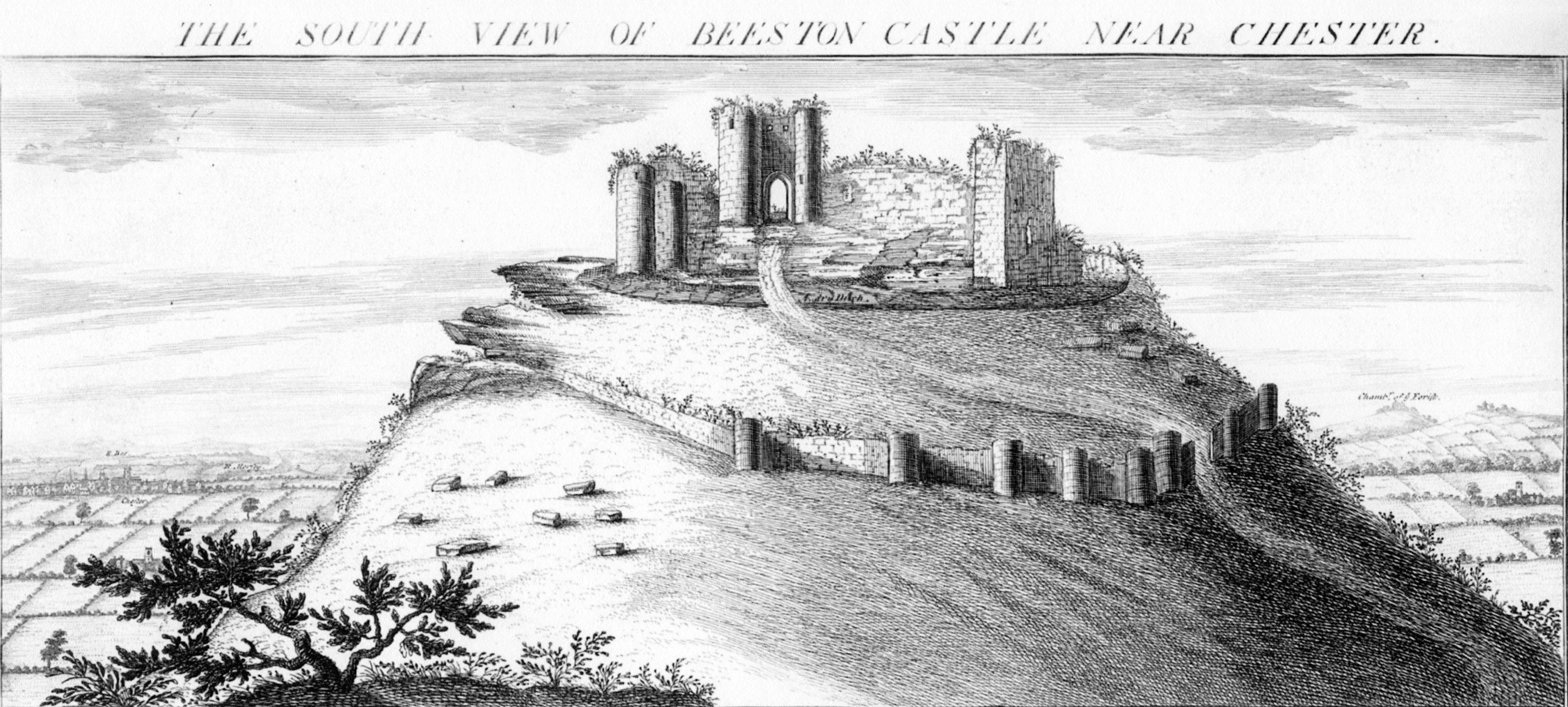
Engraving of 1727 by the Buck Brothers, showing Beeston Castle from the south

Unlike many other castles of the period, Beeston does not have a keep as its last line of defence. Instead the natural features of the land, together with massive walls, strong gatehouses, and carefully positioned towers, made the baileys themselves the stronghold. The defences consisted of two parts. Firstly, a rectangular castle on the summit of the hill, with a sheer drop on three sides and a defensive ditch up to 30 feet (9 m) deep in places cut into the rock on the fourth side. Secondly, an outer bailey was built on the lower slopes, with a massive gatehouse protected by a 16-foot (5 m) wide and 10-foot (3 m) deep ditch.

The outer bailey was roughly rectangular, with 6-foot (2 m) thick walls faced in sandstone and infilled with rubble. The walls, parts of which still remain, contain a number of D-shaped towers, an innovation in English castles at that time. The towers allowed defenders to shoot across the walls as well as forwards, and their open-backed design meant that they would not offer cover to any attackers who gained access to the outer bailey. The inner bailey was on the rocky summit at the western end of the crag.

To provide the castle's inhabitants with a supply of fresh water, two wells were dug into the rock; one of them, 370 feet (113 m) deep, is one of the deepest castle wells in England.

=== Royal castle ===
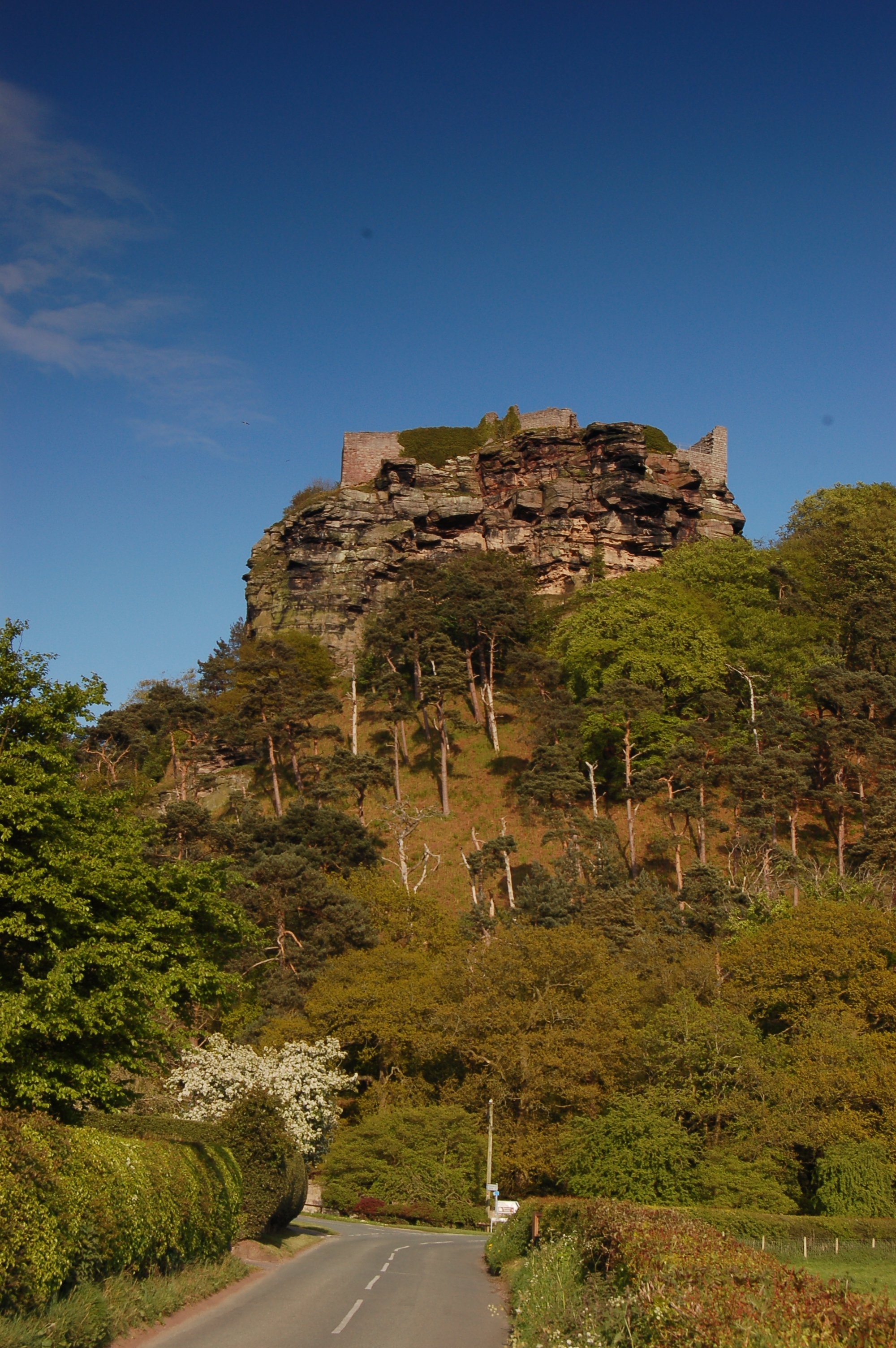
Beeston Castle is built on a rocky summit 350 feet (110 m) above the Cheshire Plain.

Although most of the defences were in place by the time of Ranulph's death in 1232, there were no living quarters, and neither were there on the death of Ranulph's successor John in 1237. John died without a male heir, allowing King Henry III to take over the Earldom of Cheshire. Henry enlarged Beeston Castle during his wars with Wales, and used it as a prison for his Welsh captives. No attempt was made to equip the castle as a permanent residence with halls and chambers; garrisons were probably housed in wooden structures within the outer bailey.

In 1254 Henry gave Beeston, together with other lands in Cheshire, to his son Prince Edward. He also gave the title Earl of Chester to the prince, a title that has been conferred on the heir to the throne of England ever since. During the Montfortian rebellion, in 1265, the castle was retaken from the Monfortians by James de Audley and Urian de Saint Pierre, following Edward's escape from captivity. The County Palatine had been briefly claimed by Simon de Montfort in January 1265. Edward succeeded Henry as King of England in 1272, and completed the conquest of Wales.

In the middle of the 14th century there are references to men of Cheshire who were made constables of the royal castle. (Note: Entries for 14th-century constables include: 1338–9, Richard son of Robert de Praers, late sheriff of Chester, and constable of the castle of Beeston. 28 November 1359. Edward earl of Chester (Edward, the Black Prince) grants to Robert de Halghton the office of constable of Beeston, and receiver of the issues of the lands and tenements of John de St. Pierre, durante bene placito. Salary £4. a year. 10 November 1361. Edward earl of Chester (Edward, the Black Prince) grants similar to John de Brundelegh (Brindley) – Offices: Constable of Beeston castle and receiver of St Pierre lands. Wages: £4 a year and turf from Peckforton moss. Orders: To reside in the castle.) The constable would probably have lived in or near the gatehouse. The habitation was described in an account of the castle in 1593 by Sampson Erdeswicke, which describes, "a goodly strong gatehouse, and strong wall with other buildings, which when they flourished were a convenient habitation for any great personage."

Beeston was kept in good repair and improved during Edward's reign, and throughout the 14th century. However, by the 16th century the castle was considered to be of no further use to the English Crown, and in 1602 it was sold to Sir Hugh Beeston (c. 1547–1626) of Beeston Hall.

There have been persistent rumours of a treasure hidden by Richard II somewhere in the castle grounds. Richard is supposed to have hidden part of his personal wealth at Beeston on his journey to Chester in 1399, before boarding a ship to Ireland to suppress a rebellion there. On his return, Richard was deposed by Henry, Duke of Lancaster, the future Henry IV, and his treasure is said to have remained undiscovered. Many searches have been carried out, most of them focusing on the deep well in the inner bailey, but nothing has ever been found. The rumour of hidden treasure may not be well founded, as Henry IV is recorded as having "recovered Richard's gold and jewellery from its various hiding places".

== Civil War ==
During the English Civil War many neglected castles were pressed into service. Beeston was seized on 20 February 1643 by Parliamentary forces commanded by Sir William Brereton. The walls were repaired and the motte was cleaned out. During 1643 part of the royal army of Ireland landed at Chester. On 13 December 1643 Captain Thomas Sandford and eight soldiers from that army crept into Beeston at night (possibly aided by treachery) and surprised the castle governor, Captain Thomas Steele, who was so shaken by the event that he surrendered on the promise that he would be allowed to march out of the castle with honours. Steele was tried and shot for his failure to hold the castle.

The Royalists survived a siege by parliamentary forces from November 1644 until November 1645, when their lack of food forced them to surrender. The castle was partially demolished in 1646, to prevent its further use as a stronghold.

== Later history ==
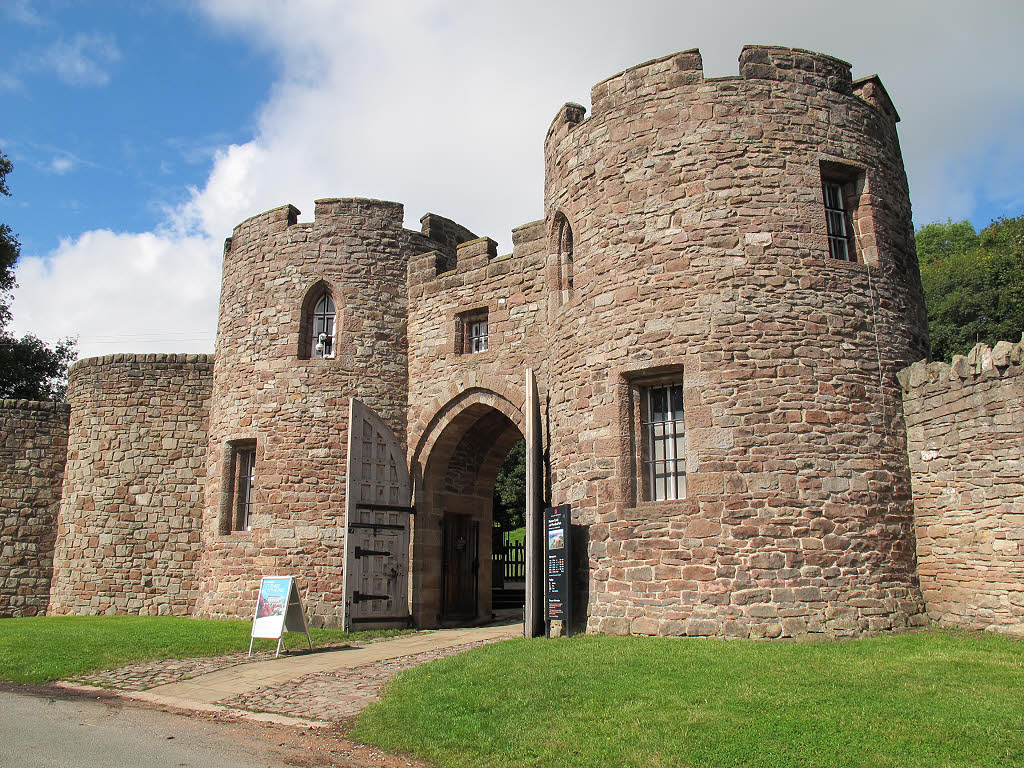
The 19th-century gatehouse

In the late 17th century, Sir Thomas Grosvenor, 3rd Baronet, commissioned William Samwell to build Eaton Hall. It was arranged to draw attention of people at the hall to the ruins of Beeston Castle. Quarrying was carried out in the castle grounds during the 18th century, and the gatehouse leading into the outer bailey was demolished to build a track for the stones to be removed from the site.

In 1840 the castle was purchased by John Tollemache, 1st Baron Tollemache, at that time the largest landowner in Cheshire, as part of a larger estate. In the mid-19th century the castle was the site of an annual two-day fete, raising money for local widows and orphans and attracting more than 3,000 visitors a day.

== Preservation ==
The castle is owned by English Heritage and, although in ruins, enough of the walls and towers are still in place to provide a clear picture of how it would have looked in its prime. It is open to visitors and has a small museum and visitor's centre. A lodge house was built by Tollemache in the 19th century, and was expanded in the 20th century. The lodge is two storeys high, with two circular towers either side of a central archway. It is designated as a Grade II listed building.

The views from Beeston stretch across eight counties from the Pennines in the east to the Welsh mountains in the west.

== See also ==
- Peckforton Castle
- Grade I listed buildings in Cheshire
- Listed buildings in Beeston, Cheshire
- List of castles in Cheshire
- Scheduled Monuments in Cheshire (1066–1539)
- List of museums in Cheshire
