= Christopher Naylor (chef) =

British head chef

- Born: 28 November 1970 (age 55); Carlisle, Cumbria, England, United Kingdom
- Occupation: Chef
- Employer: Restaurant Vermeer
- Known for: Michelin star
- Predecessor: Pascal Jalhaij

Christopher Naylor (born 28 November 1970) is a British head chef, leading the kitchen of the Michelin starred Restaurant Vermeer in Amsterdam, Netherlands. Under his leadership, Restaurant Vermeer was awarded one Michelin star in the periods 2005–2007 and 2011–2022

In 2004, Naylor took over the two starred Restaurant Vermeer from head chef Pascal Jalhaij. As new head chef, Michelin warned Naylor that it was virtual impossible to retain both Michelin stars and difficult to keep one star. To everyone's surprise, Naylor managed to retain one star. In 2007, he was not so lucky and the restaurant lost its star. After three years without a star, the quality of the cooking of Naylor was again recognised with a Michelin star for restaurant Vermeer in 2011.

In 2016, while Vermeer – which is part of fivestar, NH Hotel Group owned hotel Barbizon Palace – was closed for an intensive refurbishment, Naylor opened pop-up restaurant Roomservice at Olof's in an adjacent church. This restaurant was furbished with former inventory of the hotel. Apart from Vermeer, Naylor will also be responsible for the restaurant in Amsterdam-based hotel Doelen, which is part of the NH Collection label.

Naylor had his formal cooking education in Cheshire, United Kingdom, at the Weaverham High School and the Mid Cheshire College of Further Education. In the Netherlands, he started as sous-chef in "Hotel Grand", under Albert Roux. Later he moved on to La Rive and worked as junior sous-chef under Robert Kranenborg. He continued his collaboration with Kranenborg as sous-chef in Vossius and head-chef in La Cirque.
