= Nayler =

Nayler is a surname. Notable people with the name include:

- Erin Nayler (born 1992), New Zealand association footballer
- George Nayler (1764-1831), English officer at arms
- James Nayler (1618-1660), English Quaker leader
- Maria Nayler (born 1982), British singer

== See also ==
- Naylor (surname)
