= Vossius (restaurant) =

Coordinates: 52°21′40.88″N 4°52′56.52″E

- Interactive map of Vossius

Restaurant information
- Established: 2001
- Closed: 2003
- Head chef: Rob Kranenborg
- Location: Hobbemastraat 2, Amsterdam, 1071 ZA, Netherlands

Vossius was a restaurant in Amsterdam, Netherlands. It was a fine dining restaurant that was awarded one Michelin star in both 2002 and 2003.

Co-owners of the restaurant were head chef Rob Kranenborg, maître d'hôtel John Vincke (1955-2007) and R. van Kampen.

Vossius was a luxurious restaurant that aimed for three Michelin stars. The owners used the best materials available, including a custom built Molteni stove and ceilings decorated with gold leaf. The project ended in bankruptcy after two years. The economic malaise gave the final blow to the restaurant.

== See also ==
- List of Michelin starred restaurants in the Netherlands
