= Beeston Towers =

Former country house near the village of Beeston, Cheshire, England

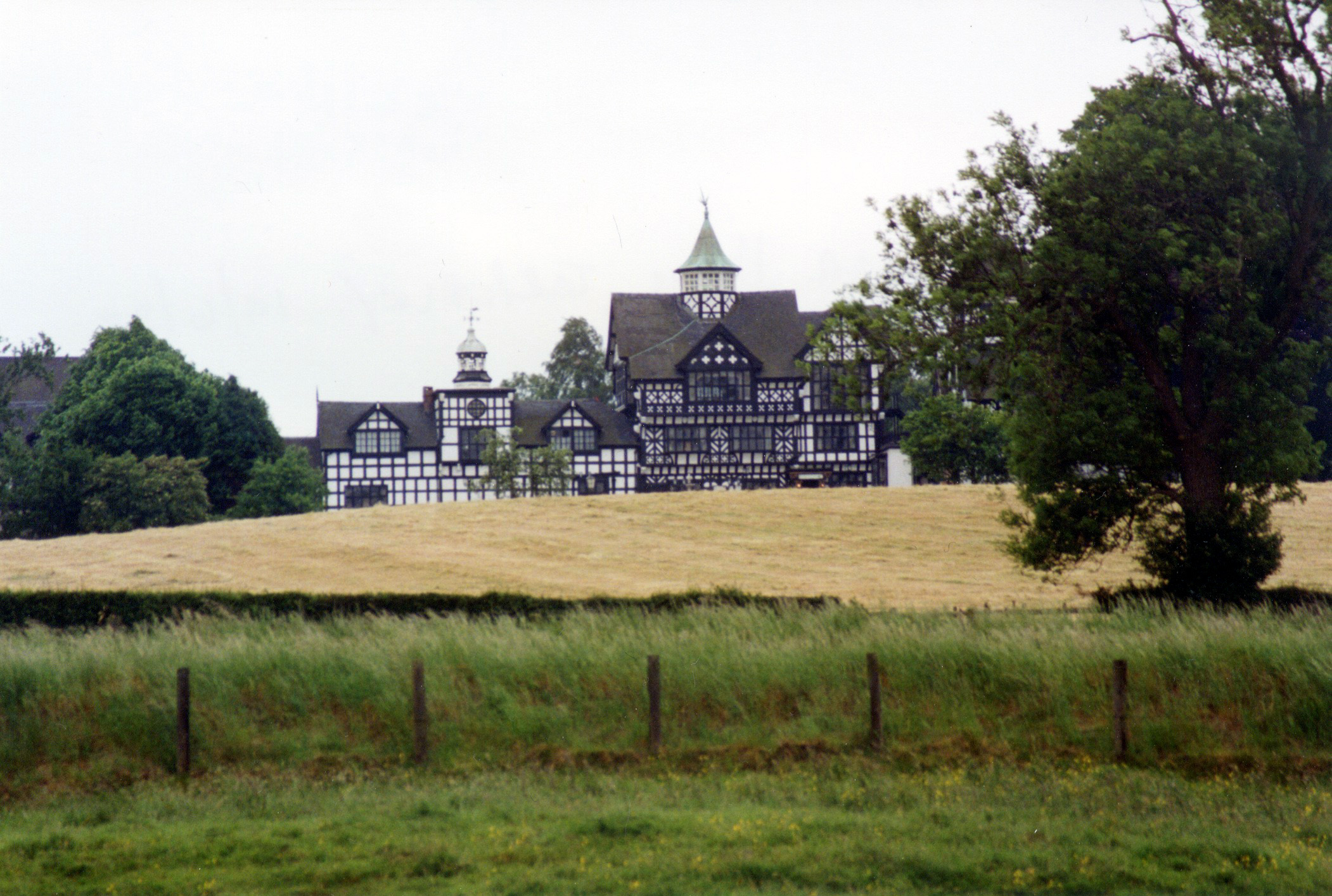
- Wild Boar Hotel, formerly Beeston Towers

- Location in Cheshire
- 53.12760°N 2.66203°W
- Location: Beeston, Cheshire, England

Listed Building – Grade II
- Official name: Wild Boar Inn
- Designated: 3 April 1986
- Reference no.: 1130516

Beeston Towers (later the Wild Boar Hotel) is a former country house near the village of Beeston, Cheshire, England. It stands on the A49 road some 1 mile (1.6 km) to the east of the village. It was built in 1886 for John Naylor, a timber merchant from Warrington. Extensive additions were made in the early part of the 20th century. The building, described by one source as "like a bad dream of Little Moreton Hall", is timber-framed, with additions in rendered brick. It is in three storeys, with a tower of four storeys. It is recorded in the National Heritage List for England as a designated Grade II listed building. During the 20th century the building was converted into use as a school. Later it was developed as a restaurant, and in 1998 an accommodation block was added, making it into a hotel. The hotel closed in 2017 and, as of 2021, the building was unoccupied.

== John Naylor ==
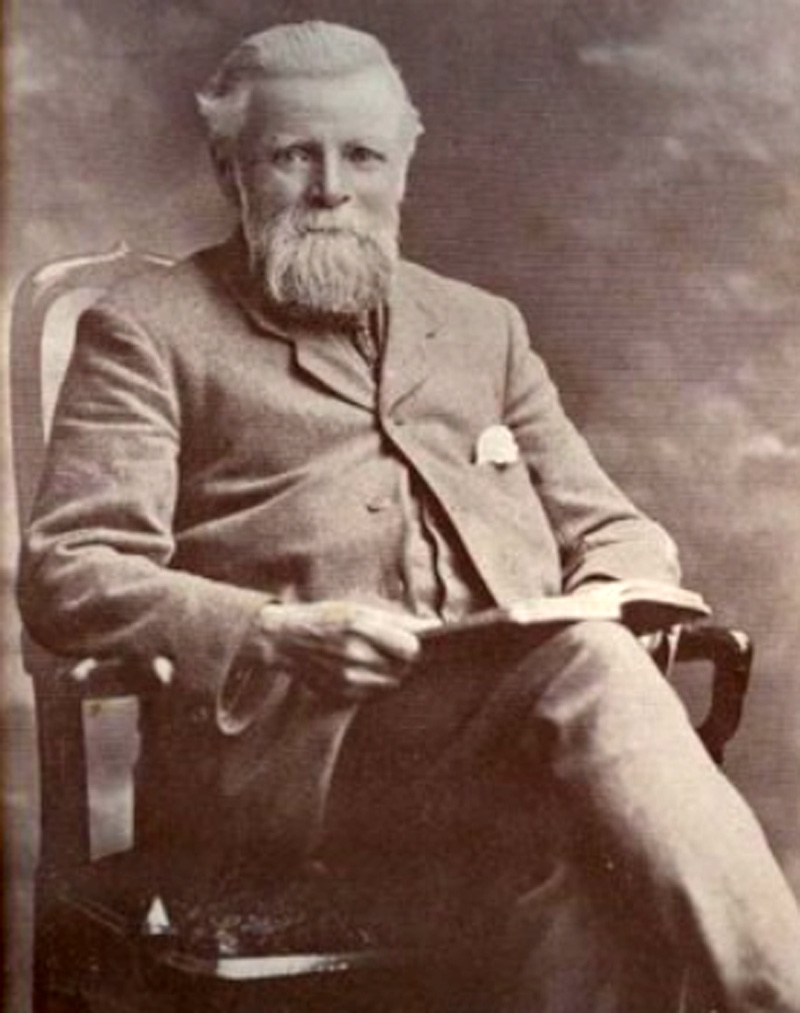
John Naylor

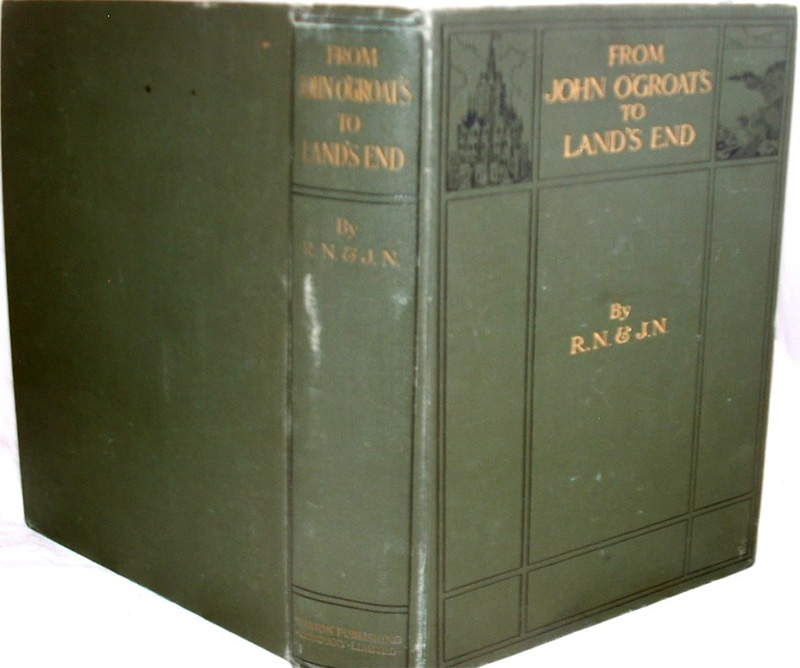
Cover of John Naylor book

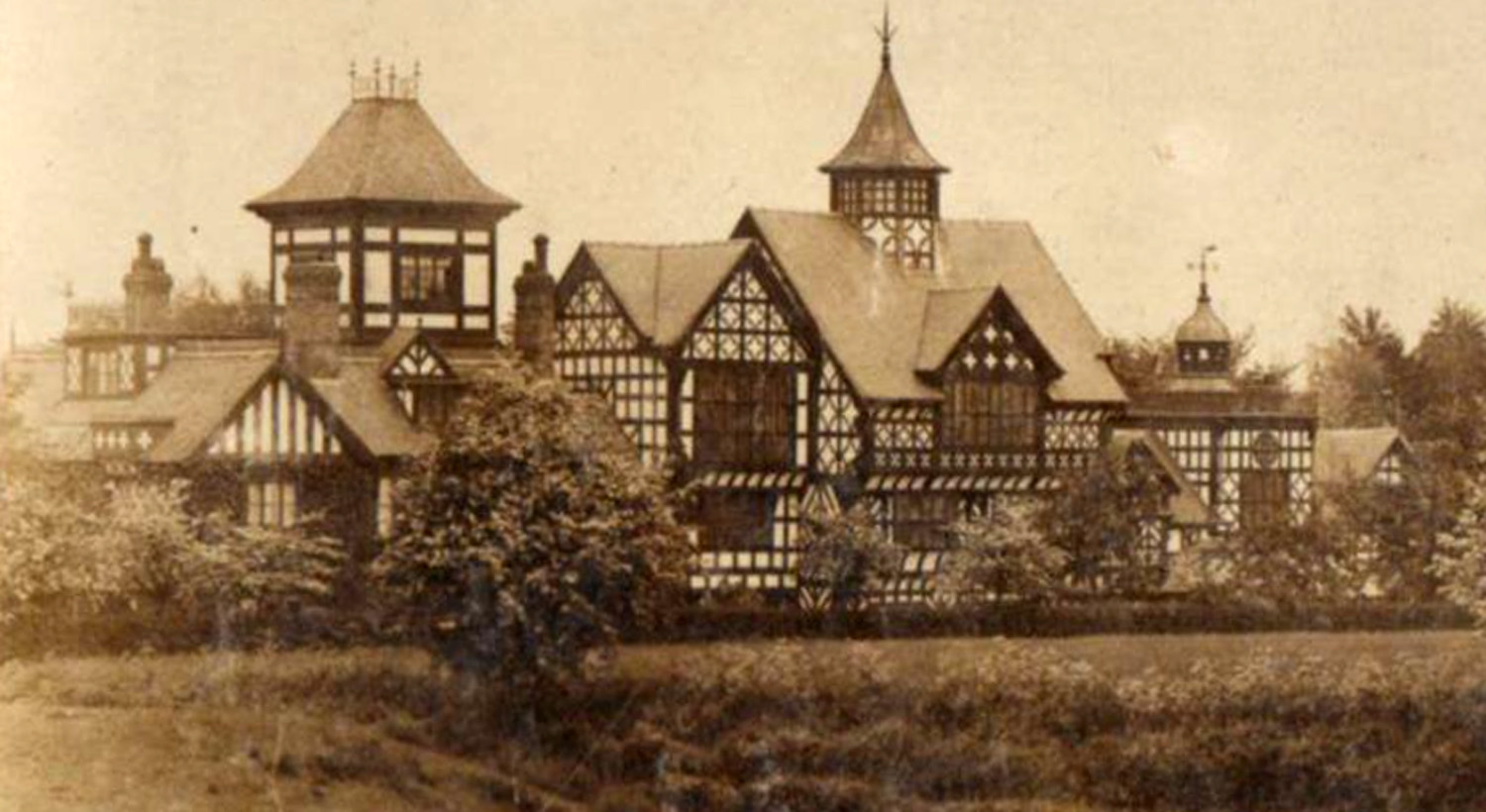
Wild Boar Hotel in 1900

John Anderton Naylor was born in Grappenhall, Cheshire, in 1844. His father was John Naylor, a coal and slate dealer in Warrington and his mother was Ellen Naylor. He was the eldest of four children. His only brother was Robert Anderton Naylor who was three years younger. John worked for some years as a merchant and in 1871 he and his brother Robert decided to undertake a walk of about 1300 miles from the top to the bottom of the United Kingdom. They completed the distance in nine weeks. The brothers are credited with making the first journey from Land's End to John o' Groats and are still frequently mentioned in walking and cycling guides today. In 1916, some years after his brother's death, John Naylor wrote a book called From John O'Groats to Land's End. In his introduction to the book, John Naylor said:

"It was a big undertaking, especially as we had resolved not to journey by the shortest route, but to walk from one great object of interest to another, and to see and learn as much as possible of the country we passed through on our way. We were to walk the whole of the distance between the north-eastern extremity of Scotland and the south-western extremity of England, and not to cross a ferry or accept or take a ride in any kind of conveyance whatever. We were also to abstain from all intoxicating drink, not to smoke cigars or tobacco, and to walk so that at the end of the journey we should have maintained an average of twenty-five miles per day."

In 1873 John married Elizabeth Smith, who lived in Grappenhall. The couple lived for many years in Warrington and they had six children, three girls and three boys. During this time John and his brother Robert established a successful timber business and became wealthy. His three sons also became assistants in the timber company.

In 1886 John built Beeston Towers. The additions were made later. He died in 1923 and the house was put on the market.

== Ethel Amelia Gapp ==
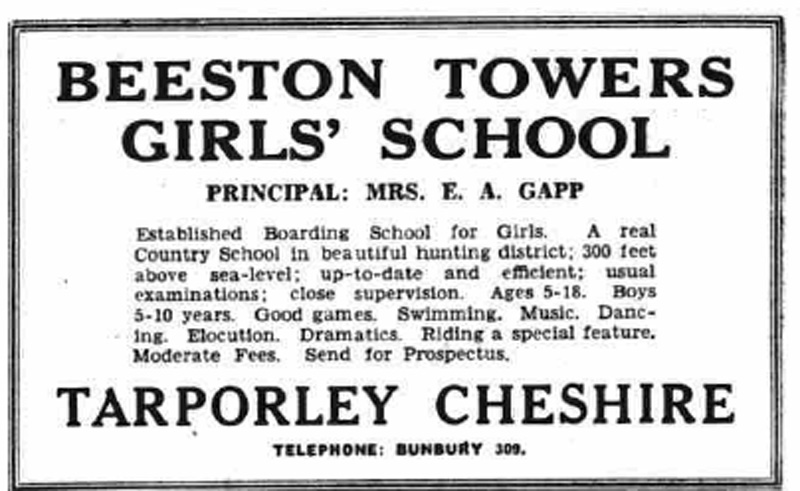
Advertisement for Beeston Towers School, 1939

Mrs Ethel Amelia Gapp opened a boarding school for girls at Beeston Towers in the 1930s. She was born Ethel Amelia Turner in 1895 in Bournemouth. Her father was Richard Dean Tucker who was a tailor and her mother was Amelia Tucker. In 1922 she married Maurus Percy Joseph Gapp who became a science teacher at Ripon Grammar School. They had two daughters who also became teachers. In 1933 he published a textbook called Introductory General Science. He appears to have continued teaching at Ripon Grammar School while Ethel opened her school in Beeston. Ethel remained at Beeston Towers until 1946 when she moved the school to Tunstall Hall. The property was placed on the market and became a guesthouse and later a hotel.

== See also ==
- Listed buildings in Beeston, Cheshire
