= Benjamin Naylor =

New Zealand pioneer and merchant (1830–1905)

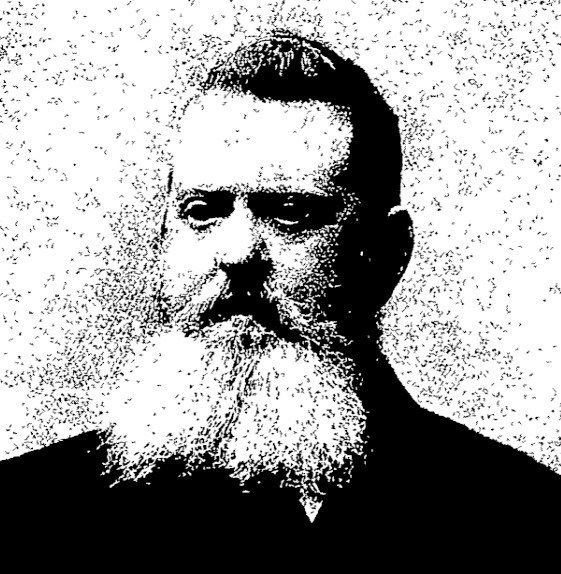
Benjamin Naylor, merchant

Benjamin Naylor (5 August 1830 – 16 June 1905) was a New Zealand pioneer, merchant, mayor and farmer from Clyde. He arrived in Central Otago during the gold rush of the 1860s and opened a general store.

== Biography ==
Benjamin Naylor was born in Worksop, Nottinghamshire, on 5 August 1830. After training as a blacksmith, he left England for Australia in 1851, and spent 10 years on the goldfields of Victoria, Australia.

He moved to New Zealand in 1861 during the Central Otago gold rush at Gabriel's Gully. He became one of the first storekeepers in Dunstan (which was renamed Clyde on 22 May 1865) when he arrived with the first wave of gold miners around 1862. From a makeshift shop in Sunderland Street, he began selling provisions to the miners. By 1869 he had built a stone general store. As his family grew, his estate expanded and he added eight stone buildings including a homestead, stables, and barns.

In 1875 Naylor was joined in his business by his American cousin, also called Benjamin Naylor, who was born in Coldspring, New York.

Naylor served as a councillor and was Mayor of Clyde borough for four years. In 1893, he was elected to Vincent County Council, as a member for the Dunstan Riding, until 1902. He was instrumental in setting up the Clyde water supply.

He was also a farmer, purchasing Chestermain's estate in 1875, and buying adjoining blocks of land, where he bred draught horses. He farmed sheep and cattle, selling the butter and cheese in his store. He had a wide reputation as a breeder of first class Clydesdale horses.

In advertisements, Naylor described himself as "a general draper, clothier, hosier, haberdasher, boot and shoe importer, wine, spirit & provision merchant and general storekeeper".

In November 1885, he married Mary, the daughter of Thomas Percy (formerly of Blantyre, Lanarkshire, Scotland), and they had four sons and three daughters.

He was a strong supporter of the Anglican Church, which he had helped to build, and for 16 years he was the parishioner's churchwarden to the Parish of Dunstan. While deaf towards the end of his life, he still attended church each week to provide a good example to others.

Naylor died in June 1905, and more than 600 people attended his funeral. Only half of those who attended the funeral could fit into the church.

After Naylor's death, his wife Mary inherited the property, and in 1909 she sold up to James Horn of Bannockburn, who was also a general merchant. After his cousin's death in 1905, the American Benjamin Naylor opened his own business in 1906 and retired in 1927.

== Naylor's Store ==
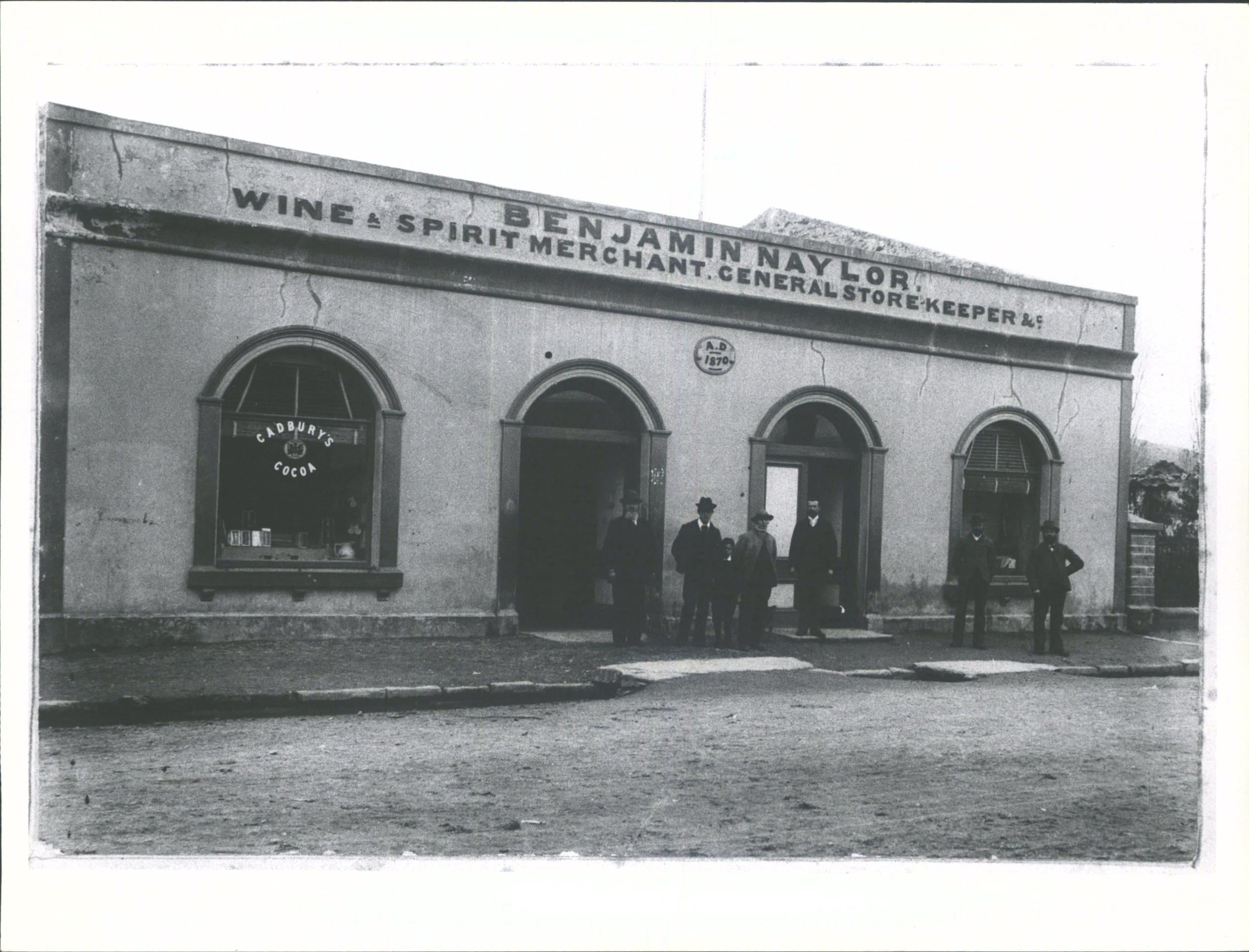
Naylor's Store, Clyde, New Zealand

Benjamin Naylor's buildings were built from schist, the grey metamorphic rock from the surrounding hills and gorges "which bore huge reefs of alluvial gold".

Naylor's Store operated as a general store and draper for nearly 100 years. Heritage New Zealand describes it as "an outstanding reminder of the pivotal role played by storekeepers, such as Benjamin Naylor, during the Central Otago gold rushes." The business continued as a general store and drapery until the late 1960s when it was purchased by a local veterinary surgeon.

In the late 1970s, restaurateur Fleur Sullivan converted the general store into a 40-seat restaurant known as Oliver's. Sullivan was described as "a pioneer at the forefront of the renaissance of tourism in Central Otago, which in a similar way to the gold rushes of the 1860s has changed the landscape, and marked a new era in the history of the region."

The Sydney Morning Herald described modern-day Clyde as having "movie-set good looks and ranked one of the best preserved gold-rush towns in New Zealand."

Naylor's Store, now known as Oliver's, became an Historic Place Category 1 in 2005.
