= Beeston, Cheshire =

Village and civil parish in England

Coordinates: 53.123368°N 2.6861262°W

Beeston
- Beeston village sign

- Location within Cheshire
- Population: 188 (civil parish, 2011)
- OS grid reference: SJ541585
- Civil parish: Beeston
- Unitary authority: Cheshire West and Chester
- Ceremonial county: Cheshire
- Region: North West
- Country: England
- Sovereign state: United Kingdom
- Post town: Tarporley
- Postcode district: CW6
- Dialling code: 01829
- Police: Cheshire
- Fire: Cheshire
- Ambulance: North West
- UK Parliament: Chester South and Eddisbury

Beeston is a village and civil parish in the unitary authority of Cheshire West and Chester, which itself is in the ceremonial county of Cheshire in the north of England. It is located approximately 6 miles (9.7 km) south-east of Chester, and approximately 2 miles (3.2 km) south-west of Tarporley, close to the Shropshire Union Canal. According to the 2011 census, Beeston had a population of 188.

== History ==
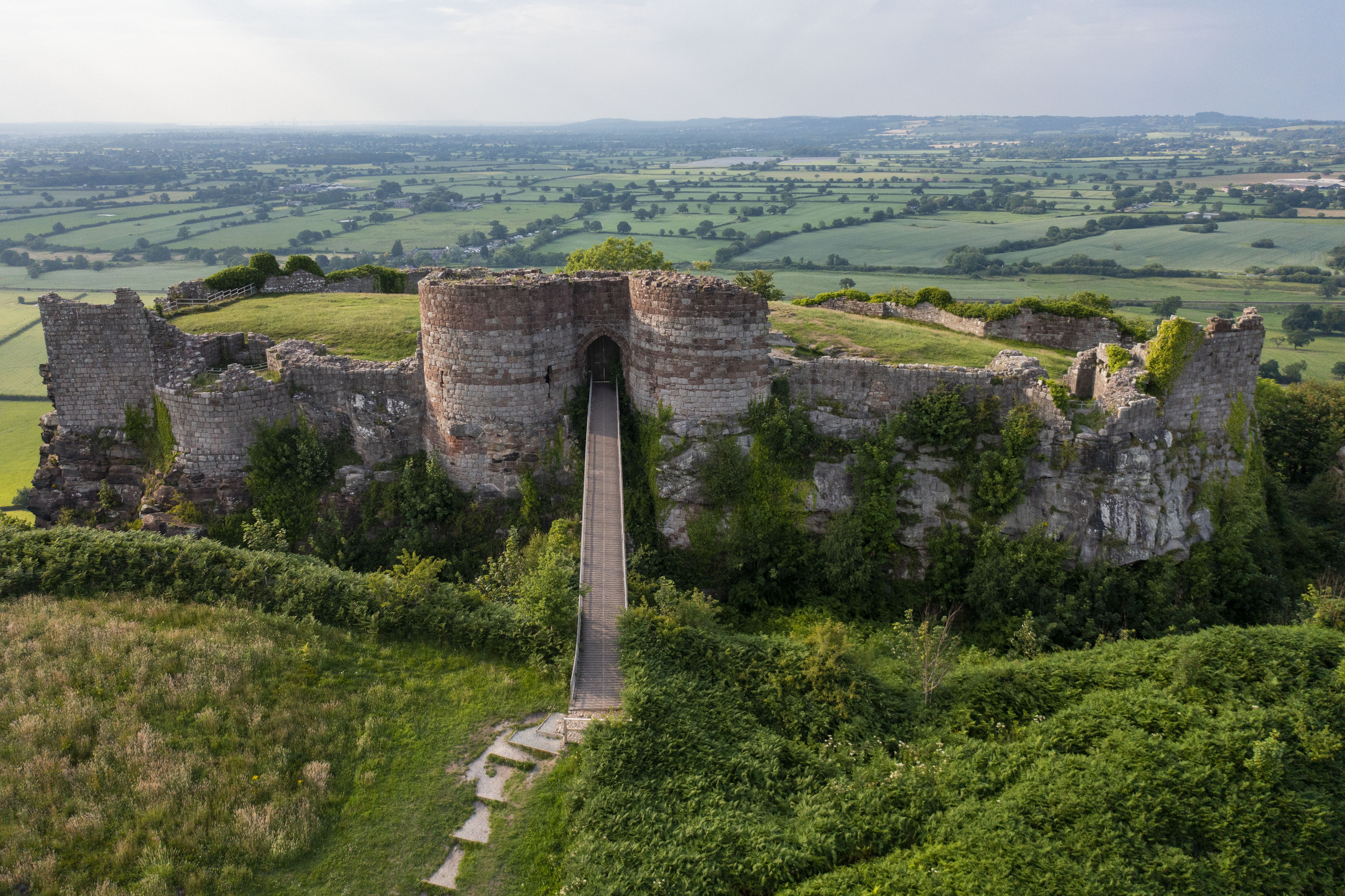
Beeston Castle

Beeston is listed in the Domesday Book in 1086 as a parish within the ancient hundred of Rushton in Cheshire. The hundreds of Cheshire were consolidated in the 13th century, with Beeston becoming a township within Bunbury parish.

Beeston Castle was occupied from the 13th to mid-17th centuries; its site west of the centre of the village is in the care of English Heritage: Beeston Castle here crowns an isolated sandstone rock, 366 feet high, and commands a charming view of the vale of Cheshire and over the Mersey to Liverpool. The castle was built, as a fortress, in 1228, by Ranulf de Blundeville; became a royal garrison between Henry III. and his barons; was dismantled, in 1645, by order of parliament; and is now an extensive and picturesque ruin.

The Victorian-era Peckforton Castle is less than a mile southwest of Beeston.

== Population ==
According to the 1881 Census data, the population of Beeston was 328. Of these, 56 were engaged in agriculture, suggesting a strong farming community in the area. 30 persons were employed in domestic service in the parish at the time as well, possibly indicating the presence of a country estate. There was also a schoolmaster, an innkeeper and a shopkeeper, which suggests that there was a school, an inn and a village shop present in 1881.

The overall trend for in Beeston has been that the population has declined since the 1881 census, with approximately 188 people living in the village in 2011. This is despite the overall number of households in the parish increasing.

Beeston population graph (click to enlarge)

== Transport ==
Beeston is located off the A49, which bypasses the village to the east.

The village was once served by Beeston Castle and Tarporley railway station on the Chester to Crewe main line. The station closed to goods traffic in January 1965, and to passengers 15 months later, in April 1966. The line remains open, and sections of the platforms are still in situ.

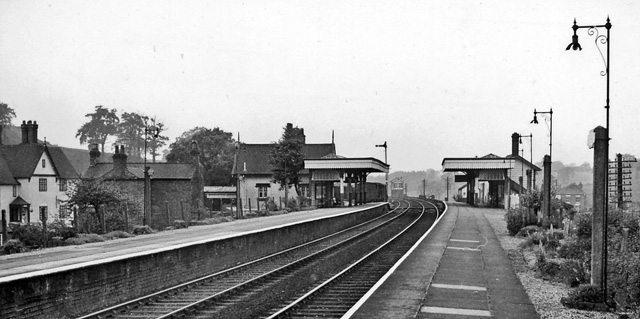
View of Beeston Castle and Tarporley Station in 1961

== See also ==
- Listed buildings in Beeston, Cheshire
