= John Naylor (astrologer) =

British astrologer and journalist

John Naylor was a British astrologer.

He was the son of R. H. Naylor, and on his death in 1952, took over his column in the Sunday Express.

Naylor later became the resident astrologer at the Daily Mail until his retirement in 1986. He was succeeded at the Daily Mail by Nicholas Campion.
