= R. H. Naylor =

British astrologer

R.H. Naylor's horoscope for Princess Margaret

Richard Harold Naylor (2 August 1889 – 1952), better known as R. H. Naylor, was a British astrologer, and the first sun sign astrologer. His horoscope of the newly-born Princess Margaret for the Sunday Express, led to a regular column that was soon copied by other British newspapers.

== Horoscope for Princess Margaret ==
The editor of the Sunday Express, John Gordon, asked Cheiro, the leading British astrologer of his time to write a horoscope for the newly-born Princess Margaret, predicting what might happen in her future. As Cheiro was not available, Naylor, who was working as an assistant to Cheiro, undertook the task. This led to a Sunday Express article, "What The Stars Foretell For The New Princess". The article appeared on 24 August 1930, three days after her birth.

An introduction to the article had to explain what a horoscope was for Express readers:

Everybody is interested in the future. Can it be told by the stars? Readers of the Sunday Express will be able to judge for themselves after reading the following article, which tells you just what is expected to happen during the remainder of the month ... Mr Naylor has included in the article an extremely interesting horoscope – an observation of the heavens at the hour of a person's birth...

Naylor himself explained, "Here is the 'horoscope' of the baby princess" and predicted over three columns of text that she would lead an "eventful life". The rest of the article gave general forecasts by birth date. The article was very popular and Naylor was asked to produce more.

== R101 crash ==
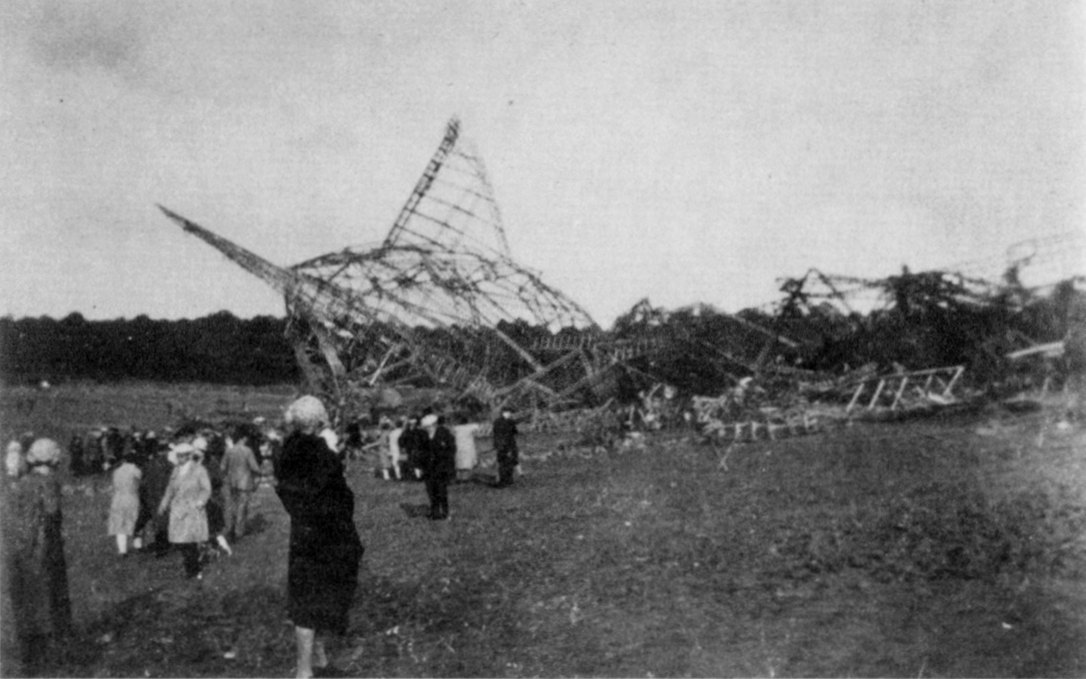
The wreckage of R101

In September 1930, Naylor forecast that "A British aircraft will be in danger" in October. On 5 October 1930 the R101 airship crashed and burned in Beauvais, France. Naylor was credited with a successful prediction and as a result was offered a weekly column in the Sunday Express by Gordon. His column became Britain's first regular astrology column, and such was its success that other British newspapers were soon hosting their own regular columns.

== Sun signs ==
By 1937, Naylor had developed a system using the 12 sun signs (star signs) which he called "Your Stars". This simplified system of astrology allowed twelve forecasts to be made based purely on reader's birth dates. The forecasts could be changed endlessly, thus making an ideal regular newspaper feature. Naylor's columns, however, continued to combine Star Sign forecasts by birth month with forecasts for the week ahead by day headed "Tendencies for everybody".

== Failure to predict the Second World War ==
Immediately before the Second World War, Naylor saw lack of irrigation as the principal threat to mankind.

Naylor's forecasts combined personal recommendations such as the best days to buy or sell and the best colour to wear for luck, with bold forecasts of world events. For instance on 28 May 1939, on the brink of the Second World War, he forecast that people should not "look to Europe as the seat of conflagration. Actually the danger lies in the Mediterranean, the Near East and Ireland – on the sea and sea coast rather than inland". Naylor continued "The real danger that threatens civilisation is two-fold:– (1) The childless marriage; (2) The failure of agriculturalists (who are, after all, the key men of any civilisation) to understand the ways of nature and conserve the fertility of the soil." The column was accompanied by a map depicting the area of risk according to Naylor.

== Later career ==
A shortage of paper during and after the Second World War led to many Sunday Express features being cut, including the horoscopes. Naylor's column continued until around May 1942, though by then it was truncated and written in a condensed style. The column returned in 1952, and although he died later that year, Naylor's work was continued by his son, John Naylor.

== See also ==
- William Lilly
