= Sun sign astrology =

Astrology focused on the Sun sign

Sun sign astrology, or star sign astrology, is a modern simplified system of Western astrology which considers only the position of the Sun at birth, which is said to be placed within one of the twelve zodiac signs, rather than the positions of the sun and the other six 'planets'. This sign is then called the sun sign or star sign of the person born in that twelfth-part of the year. Sun sign astrologers take this basic twelve-fold division and relate all the current movements of all the planets to each other, using traditional rules to divine meanings for each sign separately. Because the Moon has the fastest apparent movement of all the heavenly bodies, it is often used as the main indicator of daily trends for sun sign astrology forecasts.

Sun sign astrology is a pseudoscience and the form of astrology most commonly found in many newspaper and magazine columns. Scientific investigations of the theoretical basis and experimental verification of claims have shown it to have no scientific validity or explanatory power.

== History ==
Although William Lilly in the 17th century was the first newspaper astrologer, it isn't known exactly when sun sign astrology first began. However, it was largely popularized by horoscopes which began appearing in English newspapers in the 1930s. Astrologer R. H. Naylor was claimed to have accurately predicted events surrounding the birth of Princess Margaret and the crash of the R101 airship in his horoscopes featured in The Sunday Express. By 1937, Naylor began writing a regular column for the paper called Your Stars, which featured horoscopes based on the 12 star signs.

== Sun signs ==
The following table shows the zodiac names in Latin, with their English translation and the individuals' names. It also shows the element and quality associated with each sign. The starting and ending dates of the sun sign are approximate, as they may differ from one year to another (by a day or so), due to the fact that the Earth's orbit around the Sun is not synchronous with Earth's rotation (one year does not comprehend a whole number of days). The exact date and time of sign entrance/exit (which is corresponded to the 12 "mid-climates" within Chinese lunisolar calendar) must be obtained with appropriate software or with the help of an ephemeris.

In Western astrology, the twelve zodiac signs are traditionally divided into four elements: air, earth, fire and water. Each element is associated with three signs. Air is associated with Gemini, Libra, and Aquarius; earth with Taurus, Virgo, and Capricorn; fire with Aries, Leo, and Sagittarius; and water with Cancer, Scorpio, and Pisces. These elements represent different symbolic qualities within astrological interpretations. Historically, the elements were also connected to ancient ideas about the natural world and the organization of matter.

The zodiac signs are also divided in three modalities: cardinal, fixed, and mutable. Cardinal signs are Aries, Cancer, Libra, and Capricorn, and represent beginnings or the initiation of activity. Fixed signs are Taurus, Leo, Scorpio, and Aquarius, and represent stability and maintaining what has been established. Mutable signs are Gemini, Virgo, Sagittarius, and Pisces, and represent flexibility and adaptation. These classifications provide another way astrologers distinguish the twelve signs.

Symbol	Sign names	Individuals' names	English name	Element	Quality (modality)	Polarity	Associated celestial body	Period of sun sign with approx. dates 1/2 days variation
	Capricorn	Capricorn	The Mountain Sea-Goat	Earth	Cardinal	Negative	Saturn	Winter Solstice (December 22) – the day before Great Cold
	Aquarius	Aquarian	The Water-Bearer	Air	Fixed	Positive	Uranus (Saturn)	Great Cold (January 20) – the day before Vernal Showers
	Pisces	Piscean	The Fish	Water	Mutable	Negative	Neptune (Jupiter)	Vernal Showers (February 19) – the day before Vernal Equinox
	Aries	Arian/Arien	The Ram	Fire	Cardinal	Positive	Mars	Vernal Equinox (March 21) – the day before Corn Rain
	Taurus	Taurean	The Bull	Earth	Fixed	Negative	Venus/Earth	Corn Rain (April 20 – the day before Corn Forms)
	Gemini	Geminian	The Twins	Air	Mutable	Positive	Mercury	Corn Forms (May 21) – the day before Summer Solstice
	Cancer	Cancerian	The Crab	Water	Cardinal	Negative	Moon	Summer Solstice (June 21) – the day before Great Heat
	Leo	Leo	The Lion	Fire	Fixed	Positive	Sun	Great Heat (July 23) – the day before End of Heat
	Virgo	Virgin	The Maiden	Earth	Mutable	Negative	Mercury	End of Heat (August 23) – the day before Autumnal Equinox
	Libra	Libran	The Scales	Air	Cardinal	Positive	Venus	Autumnal Equinox (September 23) – the day before First Frost
	Scorpio	Scorpio	The Scorpion	Water	Fixed	Negative	Pluto (Mars)	First Frost (October 23) – the day before Light Snow
	Sagittarius	Sagittarian	The Archer	Fire	Mutable	Positive	Jupiter	Light Snow (November 22) – the day before Winter Solstice

- Traditional planets in brackets

== See also ==
- Sun sign
- Ascendant
- Horoscopic astrology
- Horoscope
