= 20 High Street, Nantwich =

20 High Street
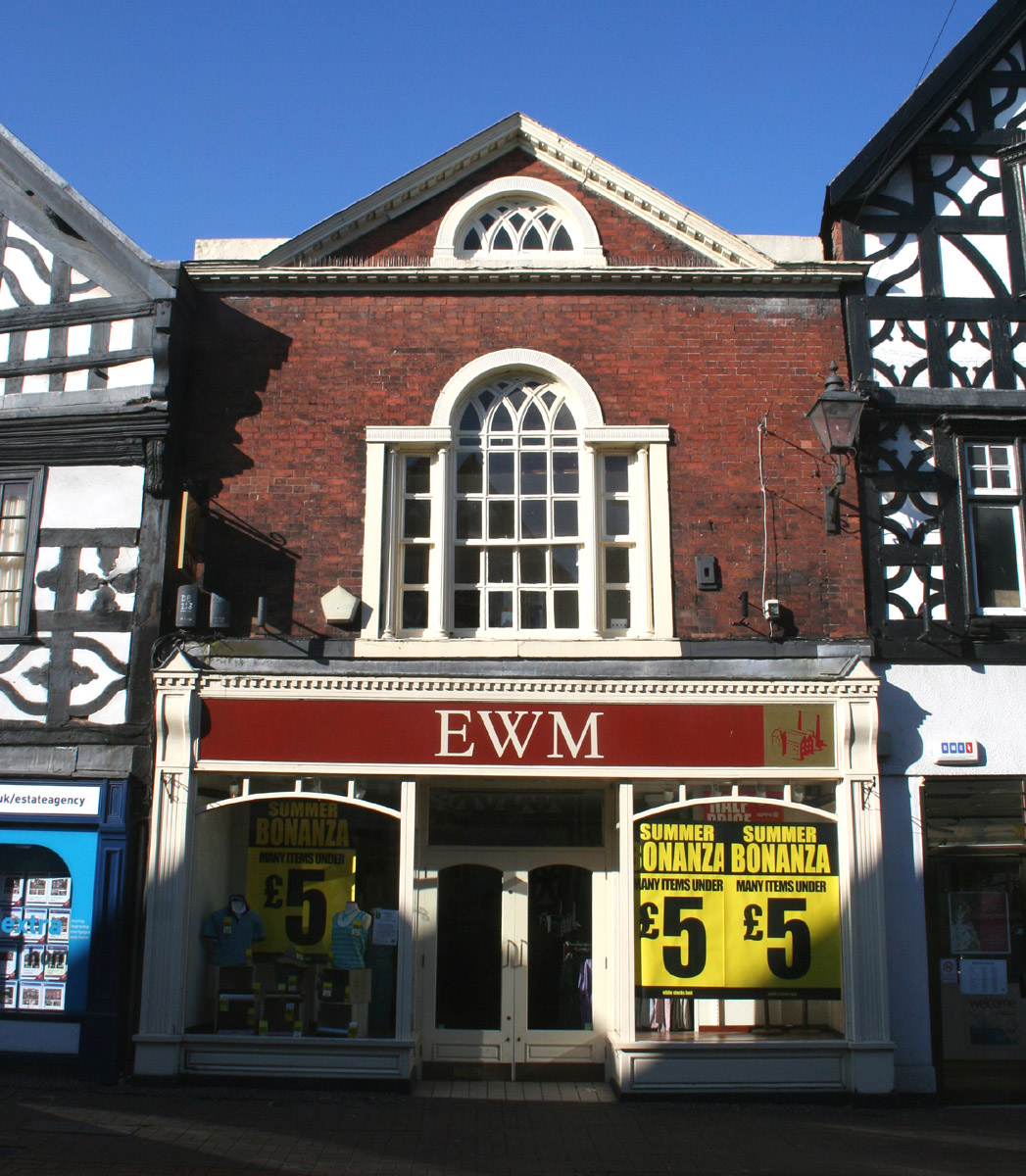
- 20 High Street in 2007

- Location of 20 High Street in Cheshire
- 53.0674°N 2.5230°W
- Location: Nantwich, Cheshire East

History
- Built: Late 18th century

Listed Building – Grade II
- Designated: 1 March 1974
- Reference no.: 1206148

20 High Street is a grade-II-listed Georgian building in Nantwich, Cheshire, England, which dates from the late 18th century. It stands on the west side of the High Street (at SJ6505352367). In the 18th century, the building was used as an inn and a venue for cock-fighting; it later became a private house and subsequently a shop. The site is believed to have been near the town's Norman castle.

The town contains many other Georgian listed buildings, most of which were built as town houses; good examples include 9 Mill Street, Dysart Buildings on Monks Lane, and Townwell House and number 83 on Welsh Row. Number 20 is one of the few examples on the High Street, which is known for its many Elizabethan timber-framed buildings, including Regent and Warwick House and the grade-I-listed Crown Inn, which both stand near number 20.

== History ==
The present building is thought to stand near the site of the Norman Nantwich Castle. Built before 1180, the castle is believed to have been located on slightly elevated ground between the River Weaver and the modern High Street and Castle Street, probably in the vicinity of number 20 and the Crown Inn. The castle was last recorded in 1462.

The existing building dates from the late 18th century. It was formerly the Griffin Inn, which was the town's cock-fighting venue in the 18th century. In the late 19th century the building was a private residence. In the early 20th century it was Densem's, a men's outfitter's. It has been a branch of The Edinburgh Woollen Mill since at least 2000.

== Description ==
In red brick with stone dressings, the building has two storeys with an attic. The single shallow gable is finished as a pediment and has a stone cornice decorated with modillions. The prominent Venetian window on the first floor has narrow flanking pilasters, and there is also a lunette (semicircular) window to the pediment; both windows have stone surrounds. The ground floor has a modern shop front.

== See also ==
- Listed buildings in Nantwich
