= Porch House, Nantwich =

Georgian house in Nantwich, Cheshire, England

Coordinates: 53.0680°N 2.5279°W

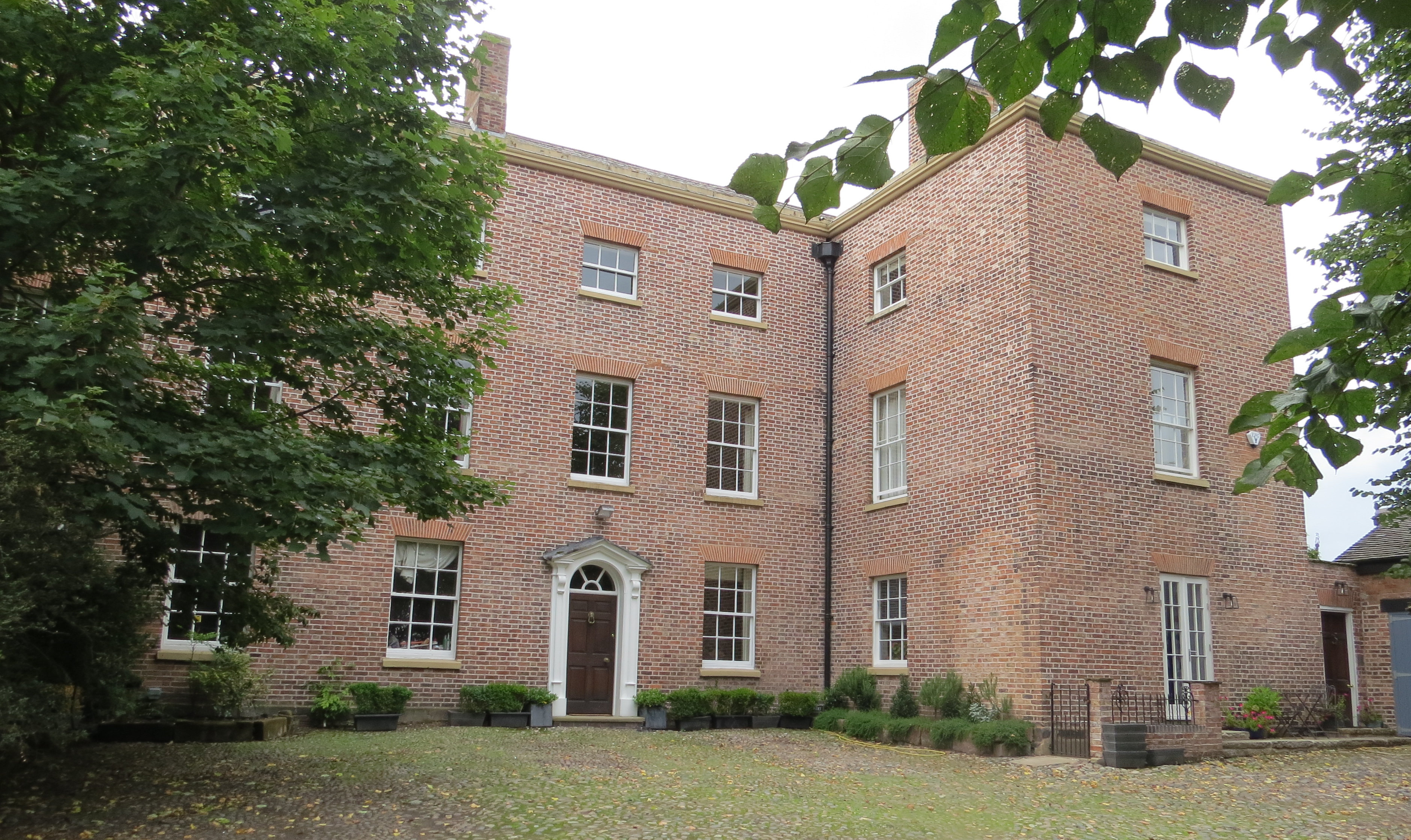

The Porch House, formerly sometimes the Porche House, is a large Georgian house, dating from the late 18th century, in Nantwich, Cheshire, England. It is listed at grade II. Located at numbers 64A and 64B on the north side of Welsh Row (at SJ6471452454), it is entered via its former stable entrance, The Gateway. Currently divided into two houses, the Porch House has previously served as a day and boarding school, and as a house for Belgian refugees. The existing building stands on the site of a 15th-century mansion of the same name.

Nikolaus Pevsner considers Welsh Row to be "the best street of Nantwich". The street has many listed buildings and is known for its mixture of architectural styles, including timber-framed black-and-white cottages such as the Wilbraham's and Widows' Almshouses, Georgian town houses such as Townwell House and number 83, and Victorian buildings such as the former Grammar School, Savings Bank and Primitive Methodist Chapel.

== History ==
The existing Porch House was built on the site of a 15th-century mansion, also known as the Porch or Porche House. Until the early 21st century, Kingsley Fields (now a housing development) lay behind Porch House, and local historian James Hall considers that the original building might have been occupied in around 1400 by John Kingsley, a turbulent character who was a prominent Nantwich resident, holding part of the Barony of Nantwich between 1405 and 1431. A follower of Thomas Mowbray, Duke of Norfolk, Kingsley fought against Henry IV at the Battle of Shrewsbury of 1403, but later obtained the king's pardon and became squire and later sergeant to Henry V, fighting for the king in Normandy in 1415 and subsequently.

Henry Wettenhall of Dorfold, a member of one of the town's most important families, inherited the Porch House mansion in 1470. In the early and mid 17th century, it was the home of the Masseys and Wrights, also among the principal families of Nantwich.

In the late 19th and early 20th centuries, the present building was used as a private girls' boarding and day school, which later moved to Hospital Street. During the First World War it housed refugees from Belgium, leading to the house being popularly called "Belgium House".

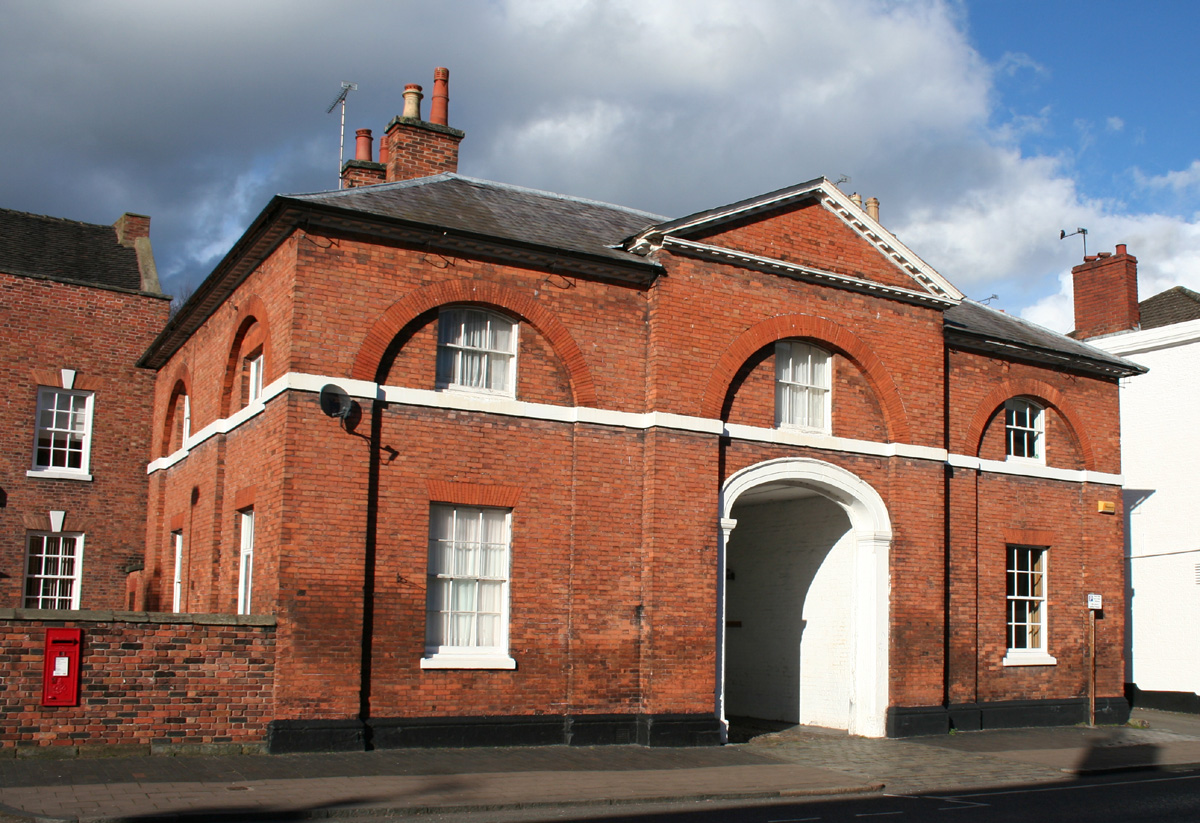
The Gateway provides access to the Porch House

== Description ==
The Porch House is a large, L-shaped house of three storeys in red brick under a slate roof, which is built around a courtyard. It is set well back from the street behind The Gateway, formerly its stable entrance, through which it is accessed. The Porch House is currently divided into two houses. The original entrance is to the left-hand wing, and has an arched fanlight with a pediment above. The right-hand wing is a single bay wide and projects forwards; it has a modern entrance matching the original one.

== See also ==
- Listed buildings in Nantwich
