= 1–5 Pillory Street, Nantwich =

Historic building in Cheshire, England

Coordinates: 53.0664°N 2.5218°W

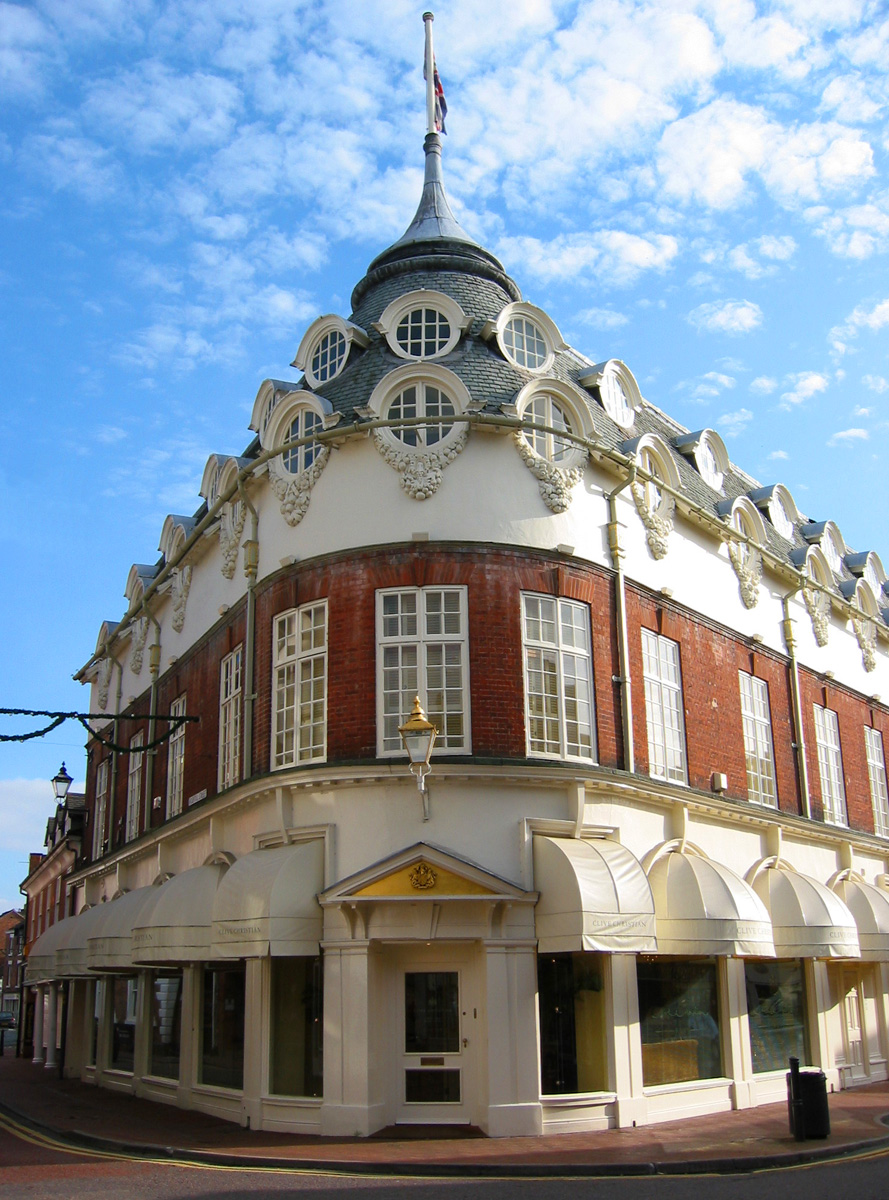
1–5 Pillory Street, Nantwich

1–5 Pillory Street is a large curved corner block in Nantwich, Cheshire, England, in the French Baroque style of the late 17th century, which is listed at grade II. It is located on the corner of Hospital Street and Pillory Street (at SJ6513252244), and also includes 2 Hospital Street. Formerly known as Chesters' Stores, it was built in 1911 for the grocer's, P. H. Chesters, to a design by local architect, Ernest H. Edleston (1880–1964). The building has subsequently been used for a variety of retail and wholesale purposes, and it is currently a furniture store.

It is the most recent listed building in Nantwich, as well as the only one dating from after the Victorian era. English Heritage describes the building in the listing as "a corner block of unusual design", and local historian Jane Stevenson calls it "flamboyant". Some contemporary observers likened the building, with its circular, porthole-like windows, to the Lusitania liner, which had been launched a few years earlier.

== History ==
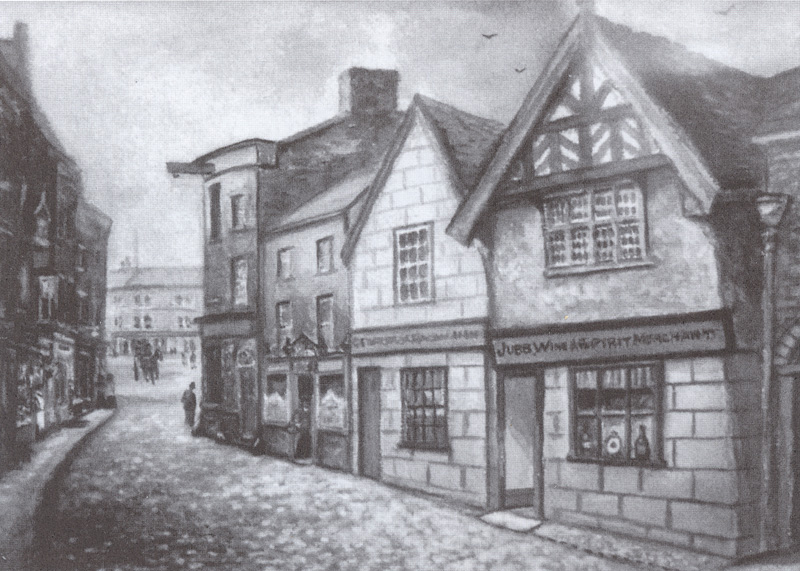
Chesters' Stores (centre) and the demolished pubs (right) from a painting by Herbert St John Jones (1872–1939)

The corner of Pillory Street and Hospital Street (1 Pillory Street and 2 Hospital Street) was occupied from 1869 by Chesters' Stores, a premises of P. H. Chesters. This successful local Grocer's business had been established by Philip H. Chesters in 1859 and continued by his three nephews including Joseph Chesters. It was the largest grocery business in Nantwich in the early 20th century, with several other premises in the town, including a small shop adjacent to the Crown Hotel on High Street, a bakery on Barker Street and a warehouse on Pepper Street. The original stores also featured a curved corner.

In 1910, the existing corner premises of the firm were demolished, together with adjacent buildings including two public houses (the Golden Lion and the George and Dragon), and Pillory Street was widened. The corner, which forms the junction of Pillory Street, Hospital Street and High Street, had been the site of numerous accidents.

The present building was constructed in 1911. The design was by local architect E. H. Edleston of Bower & Edleston, a Nantwich firm of architects founded in 1854 by Thomas Bower. A contemporary commentator described:

...the general amazement at the splendid type and character of architectural building Messrs Chesters decided upon as their new "Stores"; it was likened by some, with its roof port-hole windows to the great Lusitania, which vessel had shortly before been launched. Nantwich had indeed, woke up. ... All, I think agree that the utmost that could be done was accomplished, and, what a bright change, from the low, dingy old shop that our ancestors had known as "Dicky Garnetts" with its blue and red apothecary's signs.

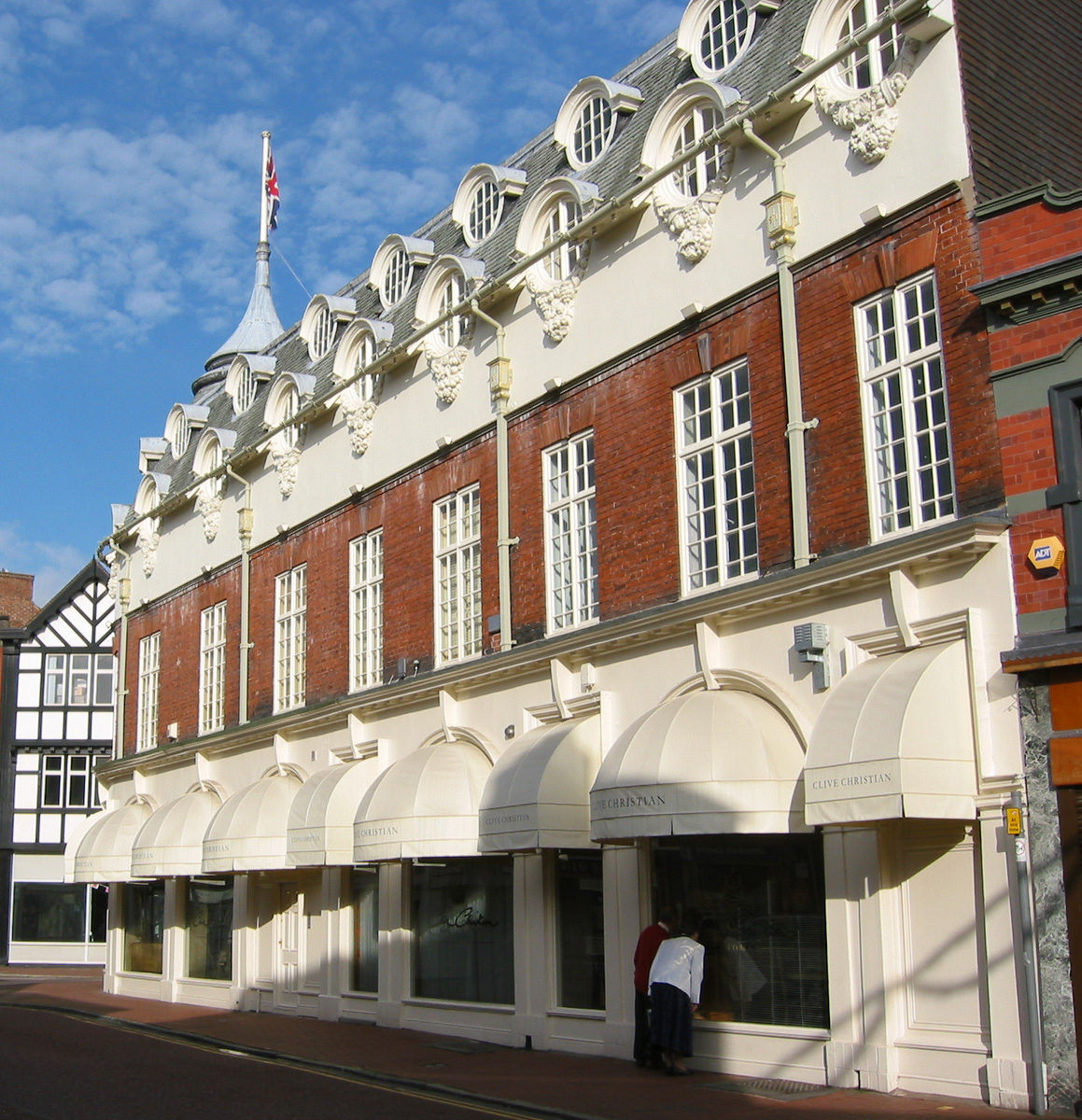
Pillory Street façade

Dicky Garnetts refers to a chemist's, Garnett's, which had occupied a wooden thatched building at 1 Hospital Street opposite Chesters' Stores, and had been demolished in 1883. Despite the luxurious premises, prices at Chesters' Stores were described as "very competitive". In addition to the retail area, the new building housed assistants and apprentices. In 1929, the business passed to Joseph Chesters' son, Colin F. Chesters. 1–5 Pillory Street remained Chesters' Stores until at least 1939. Subsequent retailers on the site included H. S. Jones and Son, a wholesale confectioner; Boots, a chemist (1960s); and later a carpet shop.

== Description ==
English Heritage describes the building's design as "unusual". The stylistic details derive from the French Baroque style of the late 17th century. The building is V-shaped, of two main storeys with double attics in red brick under a slate roof. The Pillory Street façade, of eight bays, is approximately double the length of the Hospital Street façade, which has four bays. The curved corner, of a further three bays, forms the junction of the two streets with High Street, and is finished with a concave spirelet, giving a dome-like appearance. The spirelet bears a flag pole. The ground floor has cream-coloured rendering with a string course above, and part of the first floor and lower attic level is also rendered.

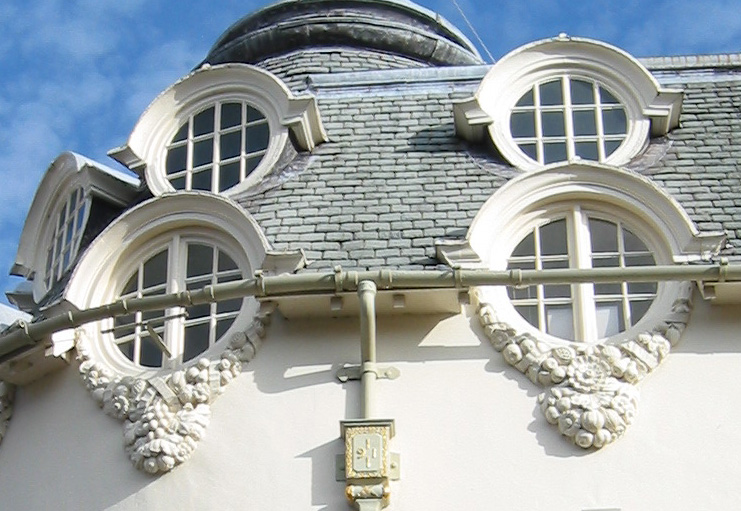
Dormer windows

The main entrance is at the curved corner; the doorcase has flanking pilasters with a pediment above. A second entrance takes the place of one of the original windows on the Pillory Street face, while the original second doorway at the end of this face is now blind. The windows flanking the main doorway and two others on the Pillory Street face have rectangular heads; the other ground-floor windows have semicircular heads. In both cases, the top part is divided into small panes (now obscured by modern shop-window hoods). The ground-floor shop windows are all flanked by pilasters and topped with moulding detail including a keystone-like feature that reaches the string course. The mullioned and transomed first-floor windows have horizontal heads with brick keystone detailing. The two attic storeys each have a row of circular dormer windows in the steep roof, the lower set being decorated below with festoons of fruit and flowers, which differ in detail from window to window. The drainpipe heads are all inscribed with 1911 in a lozenge pattern.

== Modern use ==
As of 2010, 1–5 Pillory Street is the premises of a luxury furniture store of the Clive Christian chain.

== See also ==
- Listed buildings in Nantwich
