= Regent and Warwick House =

Building in Nantwich, Cheshire, England

Coordinates: 53.0675°N 2.5233°W

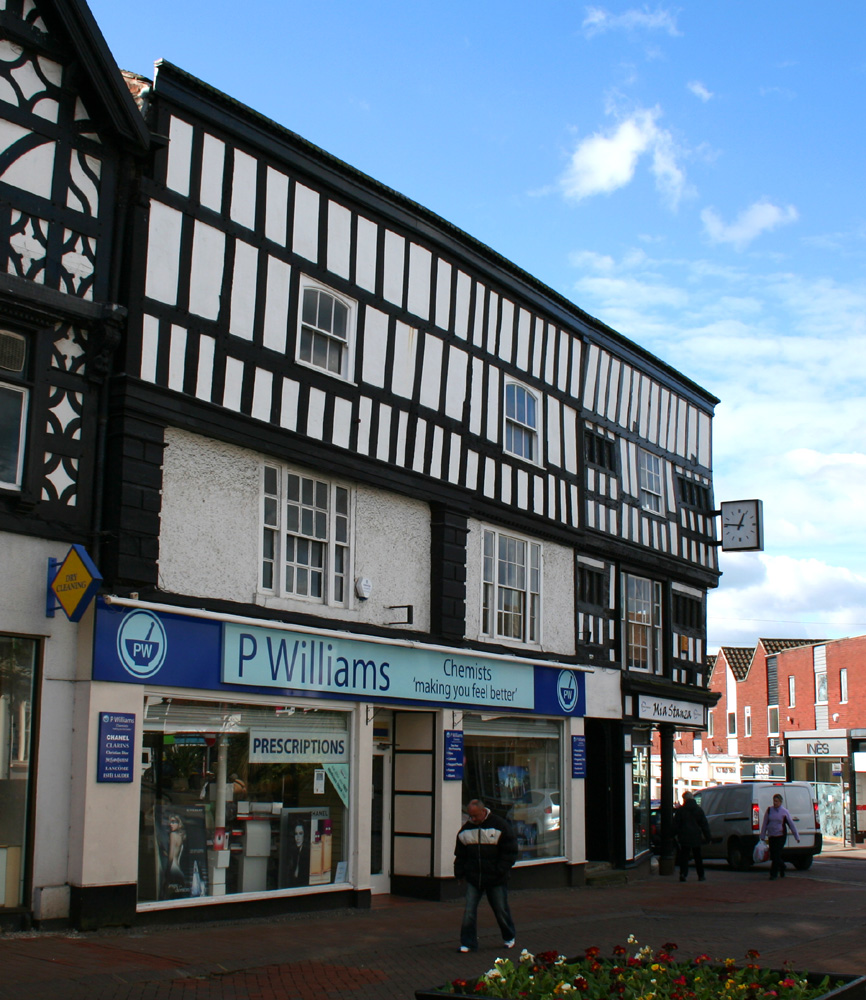
Warwick (left) and Regent House (right), High Street, Nantwich

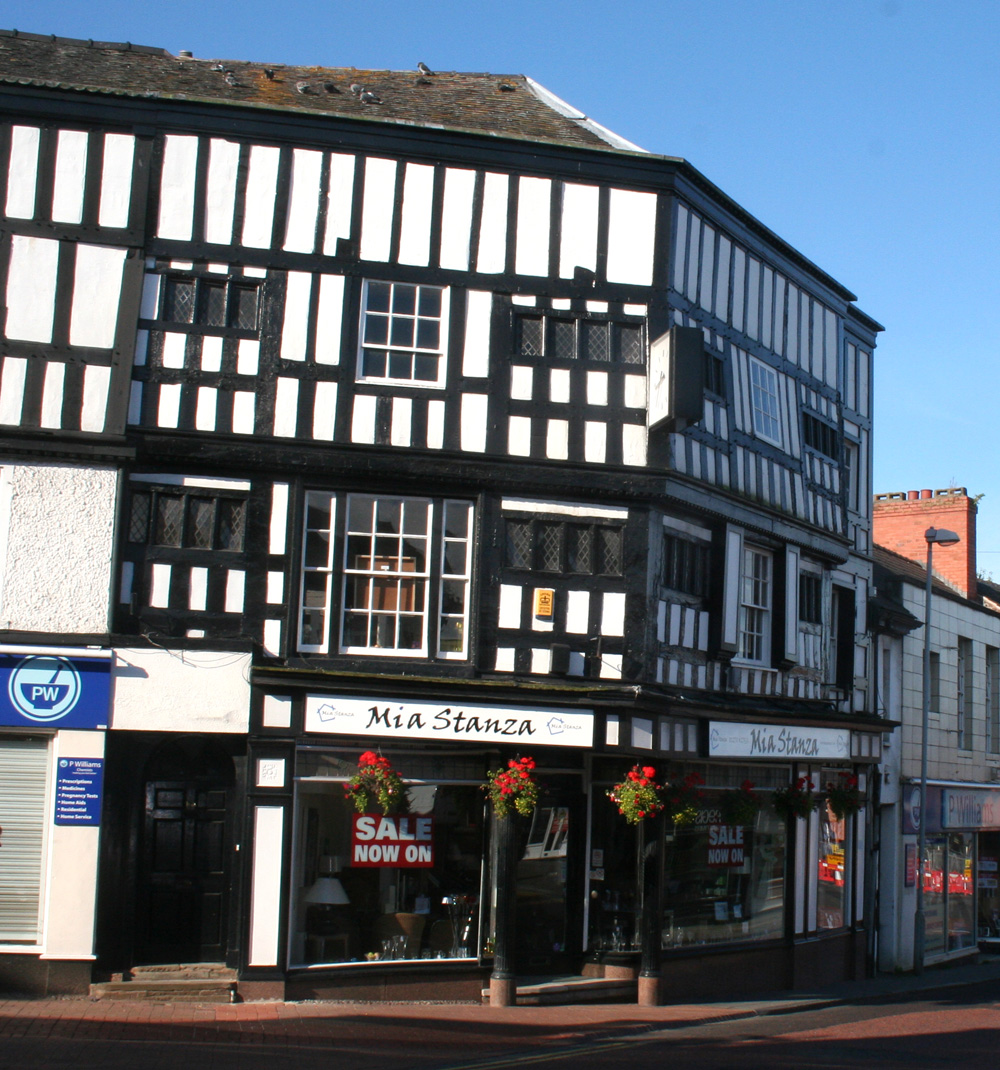
Regent House occupies a bend in the street, which reflects the town's Norman castle

Regent House and Warwick House together form a large timber-framed building, probably dating from the late 16th century, in Nantwich, Cheshire, England. Regent House occupies numbers 12 and 14, and Warwick House numbers 16 and 18a, on the west side of the High Street (at SJ6502652380 and SJ6504252377); Regent House occupies a bend in the street which reflects the town's Norman castle. The building was probably constructed shortly after the fire of 1583. Regent House and Warwick House are listed separately at grade II.

High Street was the home of the wealthiest townspeople in the 1580s, and the houses dating from the rebuilding form the finest examples of post-fire architecture in the town. The modern street still contains many other good examples of Elizabethan timber-framed buildings, all of which date from after the fire; these include the Queen's Aid House, number 46 and the grade-I-listed Crown Inn.

== History ==
The bend in the High Street which Regent House now occupies follows the outer wall of the Norman Nantwich Castle. Built before 1180, the castle is believed to have been located on slightly elevated ground between the River Weaver and the modern High Street and Castle Street, probably near the Crown Inn. The castle was last recorded in 1462.

The existing Regent and Warwick House is believed to have been built shortly after the 1583 fire, which destroyed all the buildings on the west side of High Street, together with much of the town east of the River Weaver. The stretch of the High Street running between the river and what is now the town square included four of the seven inns destroyed by the fire: the Crown, the principal inn of the town; the Bell, a major inn with 17 beds; the Cock, site of cock-fighting; and the Bear, which kept four bears for bear-baiting. There was also a butcher's shop and a smithy.

The building was updated in the late 18th century. Sash windows were added, and the original triangular gables were replaced by a section with timber uprights which imitated the parapets of late Georgian townhouses. The timberwork on the first storey of Warwick House was later covered with roughcast.

Regent House housed the Regent Cycle Stores in around 1900, and later the cycle manufacturer's, Raven Cycle Co. In the 1990s it was an estate agent's and, from 1999, an independent furniture retailers. As of 2010, it is used as a charity shop. In 1914, Warwick House was the premises of William Johnson, a "hosier, glover & draper & ladies' & children's outfitter". It has been a chemist's shop since the late 20th century.

== Description ==
Regent and Warwick House is a timber-framed, black-and-white building, constructed around the corner of the street. It has three storeys, each of which have jetties, under a tiled roof. The exterior has close studding on the first and second storeys. There is a middle rail on the first storey and two horizontal timbers on the second storey, which was substantially altered in the 18th century. The timbering is covered with roughcast on the first storey of Warwick House.

Regent House retains eight of the original wooden mullioned windows on the first and second floors, which alternate with 18th-century sash windows. The main doorway of Regent House is on the corner and is flanked by columns. Warwick House has an 18th-century doorway to the right side of the façade; its windows are all 18th-century sashes. The ground floor is occupied with shop fronts, which date from the 19th or 20th century on Regent House, and are modern on Warwick House.

== See also ==
- Listed buildings in Nantwich
