= Nantwich Workhouse =

Former workhouse in Nantwich, Cheshire, England

Coordinates: 53.0765°N 2.5196°W

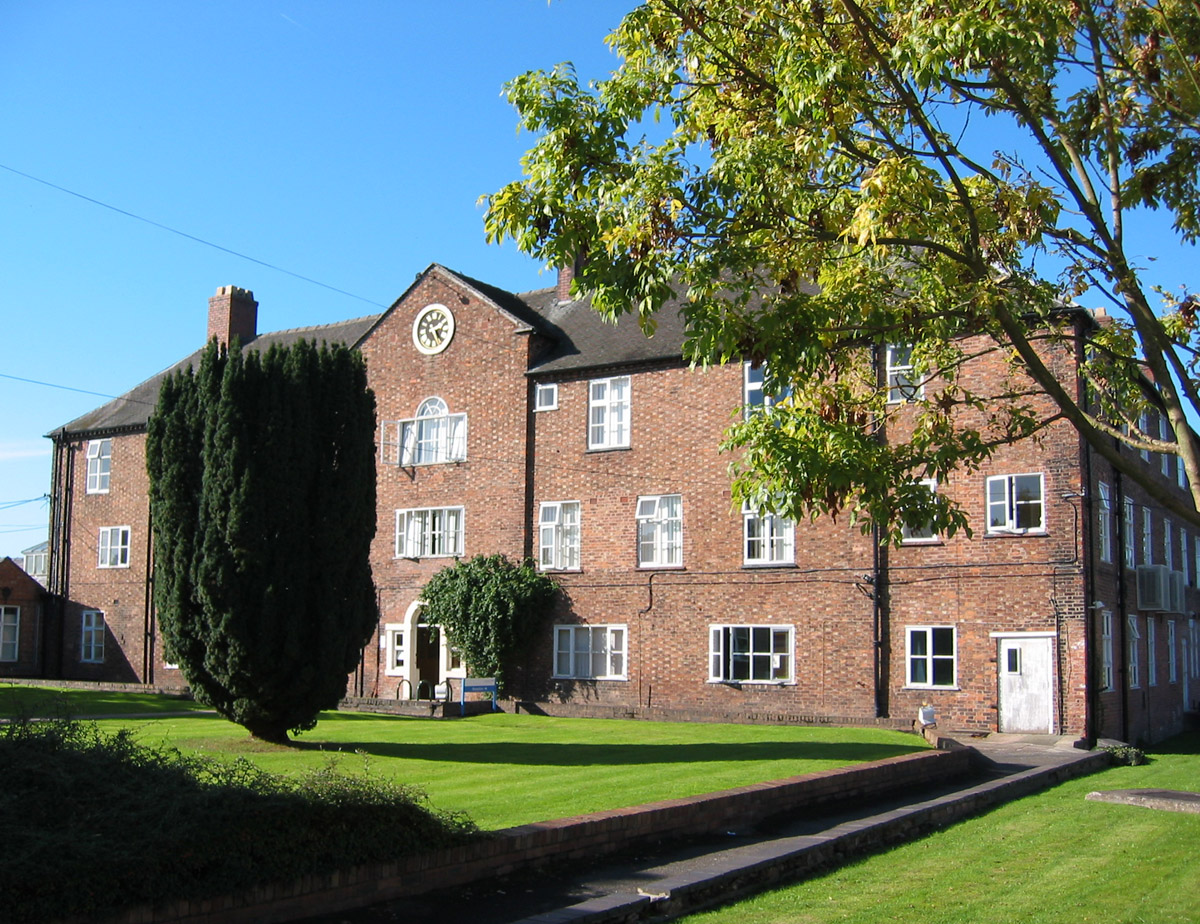
Nantwich Workhouse, The Barony

Nantwich Workhouse, also known as Nantwich Union Workhouse, Nantwich Union House and Nantwich Institution, is a former workhouse in Nantwich, Cheshire, England. It is located at The Barony, off Barony Road (at SJ65295338). Built in 1779–80 to accommodate up to 350 people, the institution remained in use as a workhouse until 1930.

For much of the remainder of the 20th century, the former workhouse became part of Barony Hospital, and is currently used as offices for the National Health Service. The former workhouse is listed at grade II.

== History ==
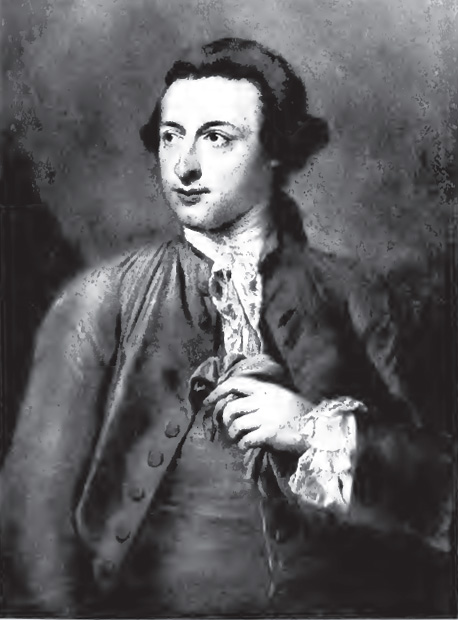
George Wilbraham, a workhouse shareholder

A building at the end of Beam Street, formerly the town house of the Mainwaring family, was used as the town's first workhouse and house of correction from 1677 to 1748; it stood on the site of the present Crewe Almshouses. The residential workhouse was replaced by 1748 by a set of three cottages on Queen Street (off Pillory Street), which housed up to 30 people in 1777. The correction aspect of the Beam Street workhouse had earlier been assumed by a gaol house on Pillory Street, which was in existence by 1739. A poor rate of 6 pence in the pound was first recorded as being levied in Nantwich in 1732 for the support of the poor both in the workhouse and in their homes; the rate was collected between zero and five times a year.

The present building was constructed in 1779–80 at the Barony on Beam Heath, which was then a common outside the town, on around 11½ acres of land donated by the Marquess of Cholmondeley. A total of £450 towards the cost was raised from several existing charities; the remainder was funded by shares taken out by 31 local men, including Sir Robert Salusbury Cotton and George Wilbraham of Delamere. The new workhouse opened in June 1780. It was designed to accommodate 350 people, and took men, women and children. It was administered by a governor, the first being George or Charles Shrimpton; the governor's income in 1784 was £35 per year.

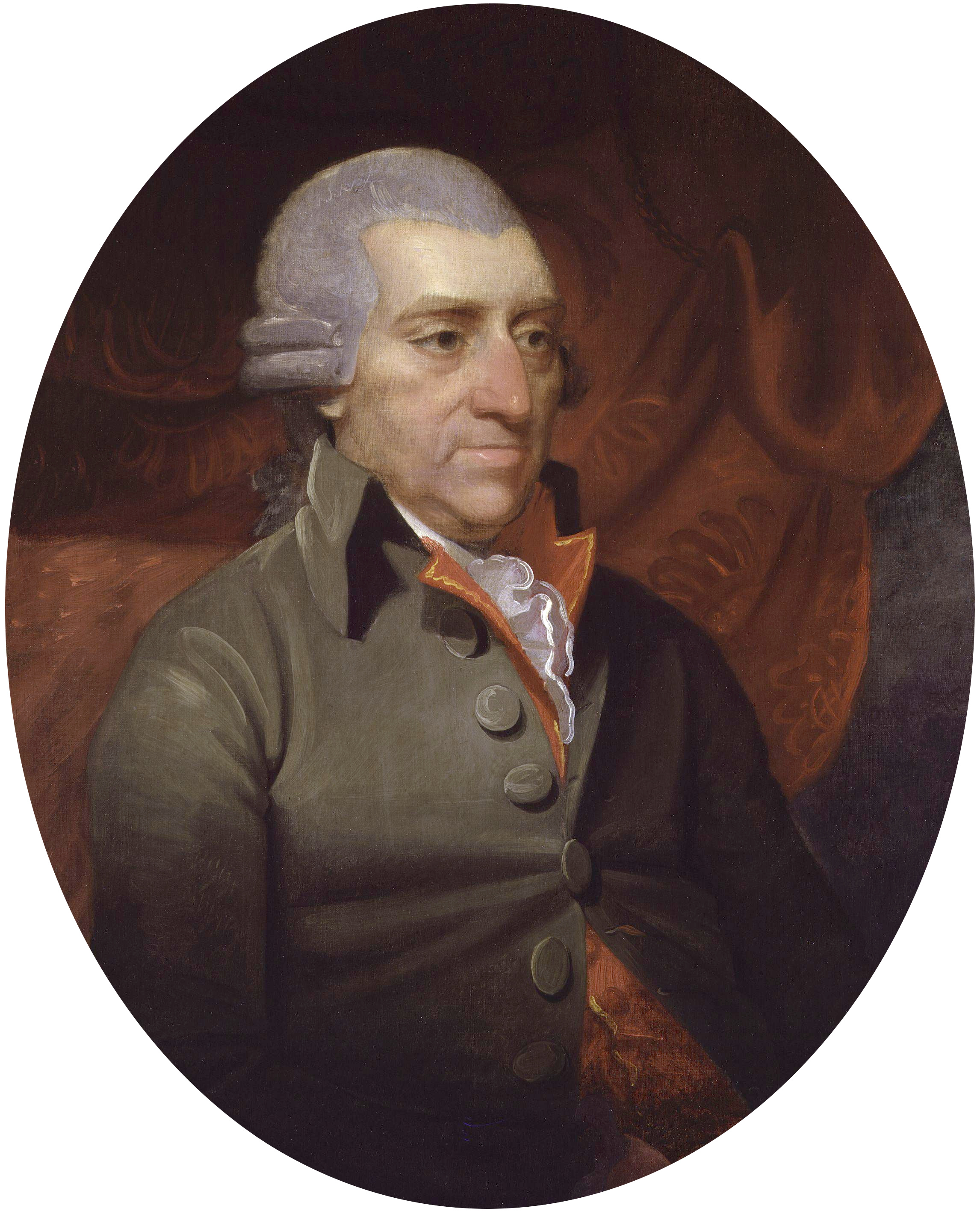
John Howard, an early visitor

Shortly after its foundation, the new workhouse is recorded as having a farm, dairy and gardens in which food was grown. Alvaston Farm (now demolished) stood immediately to the north of the workhouse, and might have provided food for the inhabitants. Records of the Nantwich overseers of the poor for 1780–85 survive, and show that meat, grain, vegetables, malt, wine, tobacco and snuff were all purchased. Children at the workhouse appear to have received some education at this time, as the purchase of copy and spelling books, easy readers, bibles and catechisms is also recorded. The prison reformer John Howard visited the workhouse on 1 August 1788, on which date it had only 44 inhabitants, and gave the following account of conditions:

The house is visited weekly by the gentlemen of the town in rotation. It was clean, and great attention seems to be paid to the inhabitants. The rooms are too low, and the upper parts of the windows too far from the ceilings. Five shillings a month is allowed for tobacco and snuff, yet the use of tea, though purchased with their own money, is ordered to be punished by confinement in the dungeon.

After the Poor Law Amendment Act 1834, Nantwich Poor Law Union, formed on 18 February 1837, took over the existing workhouse. It then served 86 parishes and townships, with an elected governing board of 88 guardians. The workhouse building was expanded around this time, including the addition of a further storey. By 1850, the board had expanded to 93 guardians and, in addition to the governor, workhouse staff at that date included a matron, house surgeon, schoolmistress, chaplain and clerk. On 3 April 1881, there were 222 inhabitants. By 1892, the original workhouse building had been enlarged and was then used for 260 people. In 1914, there were 308 inhabitants and 18 officers, including a master, matron, chaplain, medical officer and dentist.

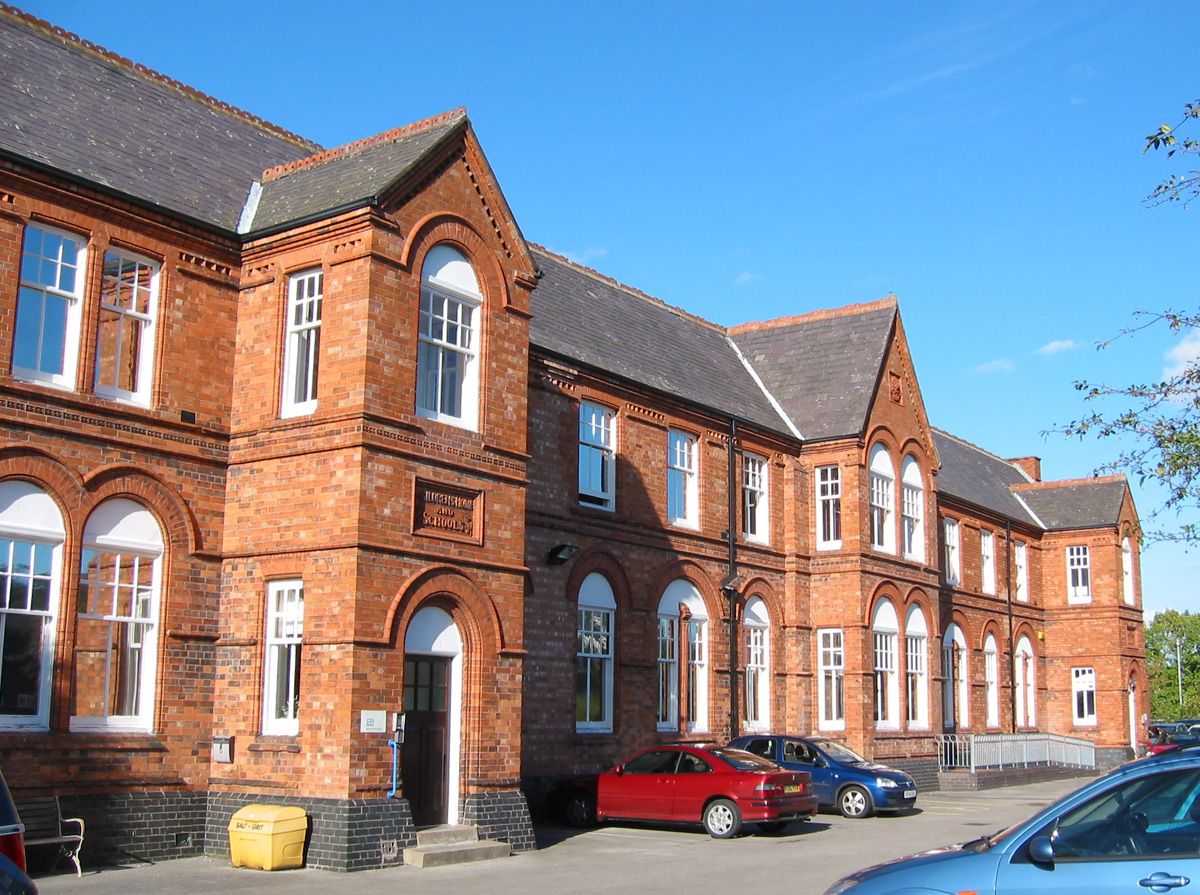
Children's home and school

In the late 19th and early 20th centuries, several associated buildings were constructed adjacent to the workhouse. A children's home and school was built in 1879–80 for £3,300, which accommodated 60 children. In 1890–91, an infirmary was built at a cost of around £4,500, which provided 70 beds for poor patients; a woman's hospital was added in 1905 for £7,000, providing a further 70 beds. An adjacent nurses' home housed 15 nurses. Several buildings were added in 1894–96, including a ward for tramps, a mortuary and a steam laundry.

=== Barony Hospital ===
The Local Government Act 1929 transferred the functions of workhouse boards to the local authority in 1930. The workhouse and its associated buildings were converted into a Public Assistance Institution, later known as Barony Hospital, with 124 beds, which treated poor people who were chronically sick. From 1935, the hospital was used for acute medical cases and as a maternity hospital, and also housed some patients with chronic illnesses. After the outbreak of the Second World War, the hospital was extended with 240 beds in huts; in 1963, there were 264 beds in total. Between 1948 and 1962, it was additionally used as a mental hospital. In 1982, the hospital was in use for geriatric and psychiatric patients, with 147 beds.

Barony Hospital closed in 1994. Most of the former hospital buildings are still standing, although some wards housed in wooden huts near Middlewich Road were demolished in the 1990s to make way for an industrial estate.

== Description ==
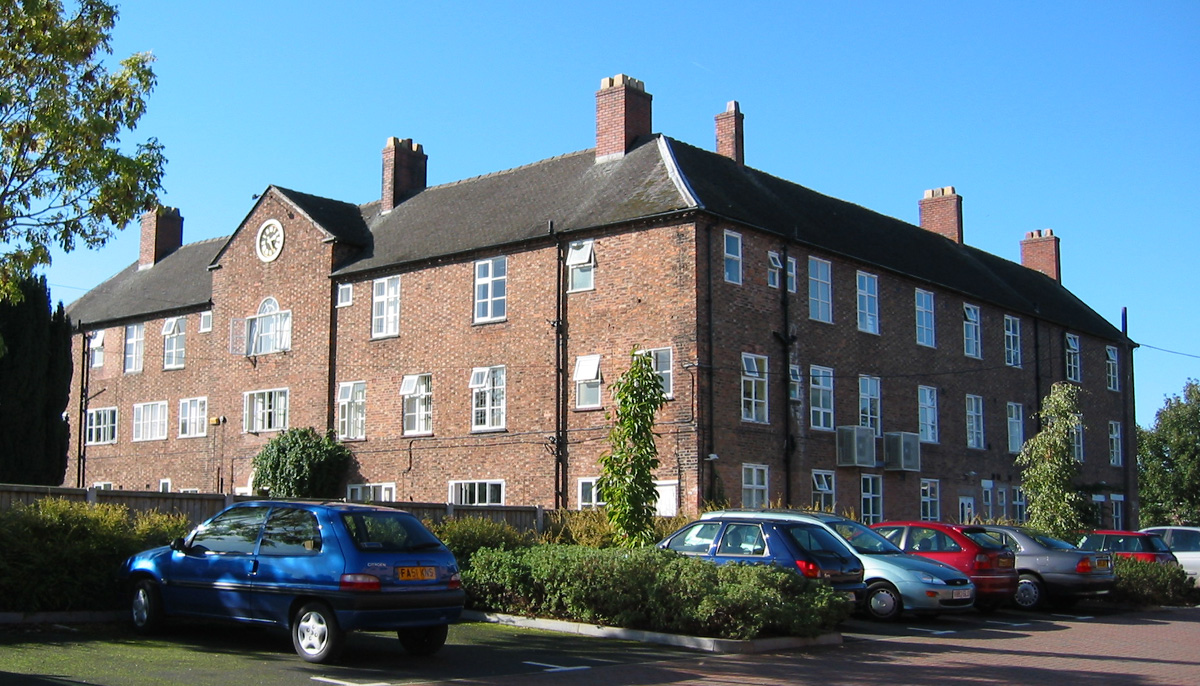
Workhouse, showing the east wing

The former workhouse is a large three-storey building in red brick under a tiled roof. It has a U-shaped plan, with a long symmetrical front face and two long end wings which run away from the street. The front face has a slightly projecting central bay, topped by a pediment bearing a clock face. The main entrance is to the central bay; it has a semicircular head with a fanlight, and is flanked by a pair of small windows. The front face has seven casement windows to the ground floor. In around 1971, the central bay had two Venetian windows with a semicircular head; only the second-storey one remains. A bell tower and glazed porch to the main entrance have also been removed. Little of the original workhouse interior remains.

== Modern use ==
The former workhouse building is currently used as offices for the National Health Service.

== See also ==
- Listed buildings in Nantwich

== Sources ==
- Davies G. Memory Lane: Nantwich (Breedon Books; 2002) (ISBN 1 85983 304 7)
- Garton E. Nantwich in the 18th Century: A Study of 18th Century Life and Affairs (Cheshire County Council; 1978)
- Hall J. A History of the Town and Parish of Nantwich, or Wich Malbank, in the County Palatine of Chester (2nd edn) (E. J. Morten; 1972) (ISBN 0-901598-24-0)
- Lamberton A, Gray R. Lost Houses in Nantwich (Landmark Publishing; 2005) (ISBN 1 84306 202 X)
- Pevsner N, Hubbard E. The Buildings of England: Cheshire (Penguin Books; 1971) (ISBN 0 14 071042 6)
