= Lamb Hotel, Nantwich =

Former pub in Nantwich, Cheshire, England

Coordinates: 53.0665°N 2.5212°W

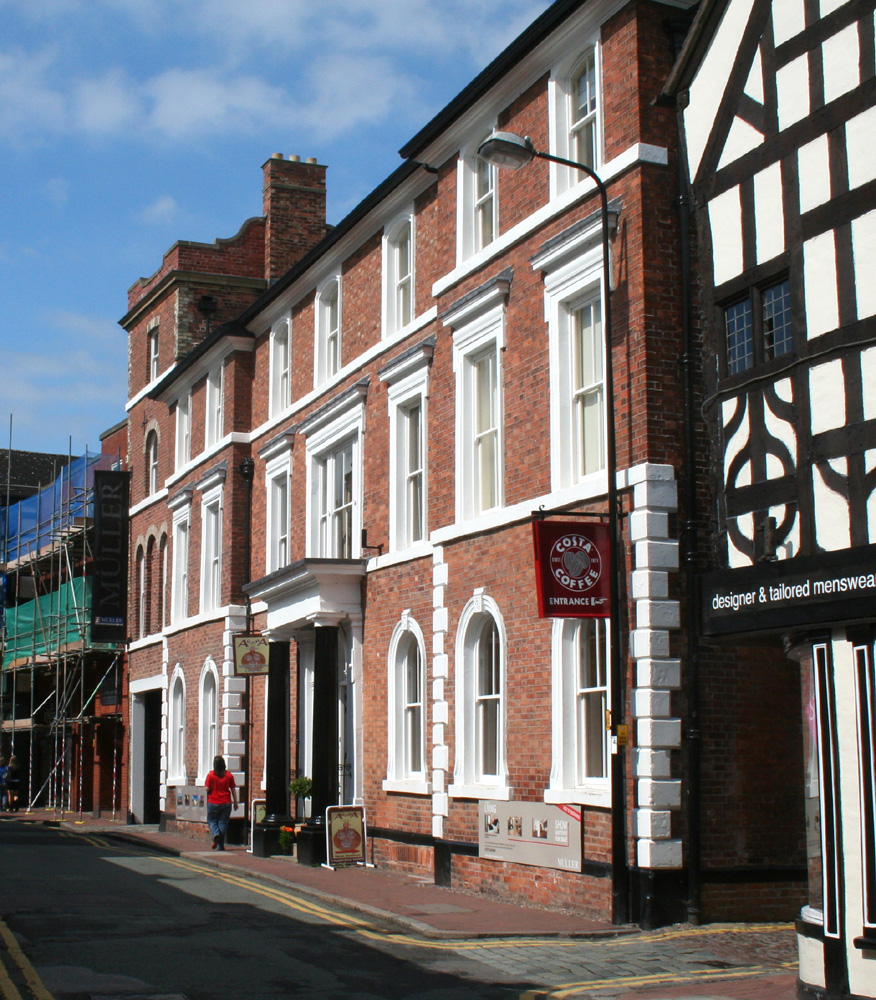
Chatterton House (formerly the Lamb Hotel), Hospital Street, Nantwich

The Lamb Hotel, now known as Chatterton House, is a former public house in Nantwich, Cheshire, England. It is located on the north side of Hospital Street, at the junction with Church Lane (at SJ6517252261). The present building by Thomas Bower dates from 1861 and is listed at grade II; Nikolaus Pevsner describes it as "decent" and "staid".

It stands on the site of an inn of the same name dating from 1554. The original building was rebuilt after the fire of 1583, and served as the headquarters of the Parliamentarian forces during the Civil War. By the 17th century, the Lamb was the second-largest inn of the town. It remained a public house until the 21st century, serving additionally as the town's post office and excise office.

After major rebuilding completed in 2006, the building is now used for a mixture of residential and commercial purposes, including shops, cafés and apartments.

== History ==
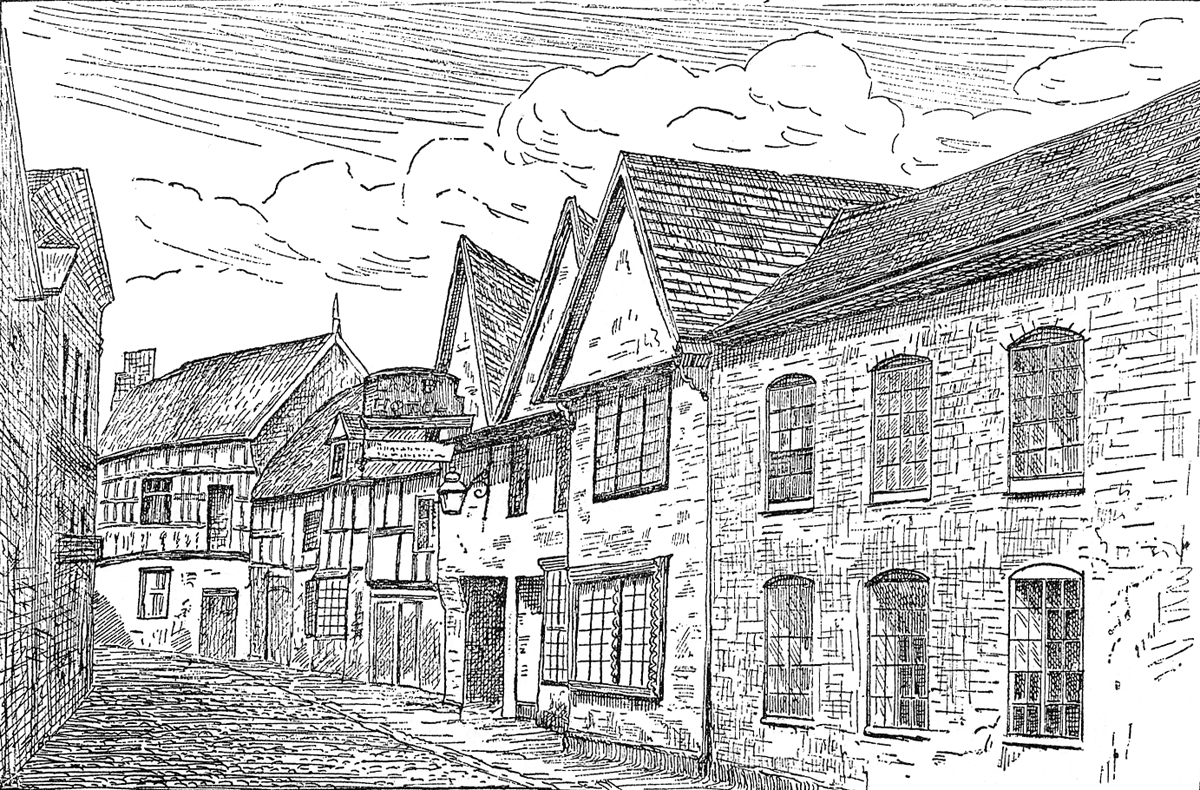
Lamb Hotel before 1861

On 17 July 1554, William Chatterton was granted a licence by Mary I to keep a tavern in his house, Lamb Mansion, and "to sell there wines by retail as freely as he might have done before the Act of 7 Edward VI and grant that no person shall retail wines in the said town". Formerly in the service of Edward VI, Chatterton was groom-in-ordinary to Mary I. The Hospital Street address for the Lamb was stated in a document of 1575.

The original building was lost in the fire of 1583, which destroyed much of the centre of the town, including the town end of Hospital Street. The Lamb is not among the seven named "Innes for lodging" recorded as having been burned, as the building at that date was being used as a house by James Bullen. Bullen had become the tenant in 1569; he was a cutler and kept a shop next door. The house cost £58 6s 8d to rebuild, of which £18 6s 8d came from the town rebuilding fund. It was not completed before Bullen's death in 1585, the final installment from the fund being paid to his son, Thomas.

The headquarters of the Parliamentarian forces, led by Sir William Brereton, were at the inn during the Civil War. The building was reinforced with earth walls against cannon fire. In 1664, the Lamb was the second-largest inn in Nantwich, after the Crown on the High Street; it had eight hearths. The site was licensed as a public house without interruption from 1693 until the 21st century. From 1691 until the 1850s it also served as the town's post office, and was also at one point the excise office. From 1737 until 1853, the town's fire engine house also stood immediately behind the inn, and the fire engine presumably made use of the Lamb's horses, with three stables on Church Lane recorded as belonging to the inn in 1794. In the 18th century, the Lamb was one of three inns on Hospital Street and 34 in the town.

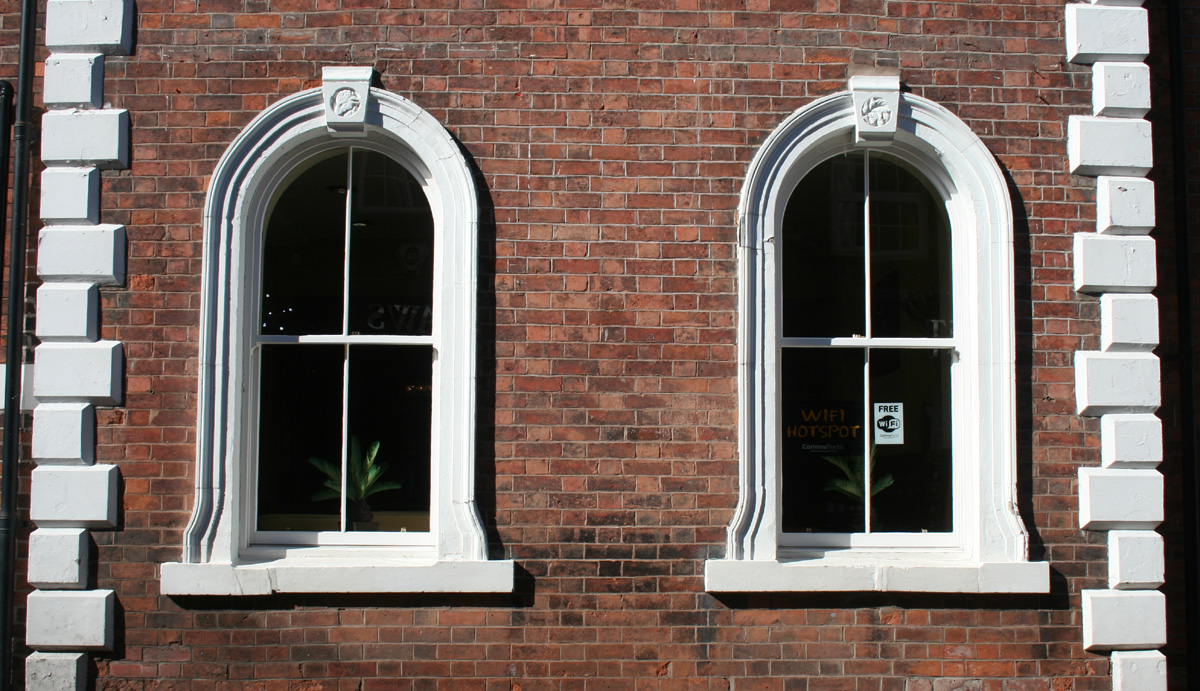
Ground-floor windows, showing lamb's head motif

The present building dates from 1861 and was designed by Nantwich architect Thomas Bower. The Lamb Hotel is described in an 1874 directory as a "Commercial Inn and Posting House", one of two in the town (the other being the Crown). Around 1900, the inn was still providing horses for the fire engine, even though the engine house had by then moved to Pillory Street. It remained in use as a public house until 2002.

In 2004, the Lamb Hotel was derelict; major rebuilding during 2004–6 converted the building to shops, cafés and apartments, retaining only the façade and front portion of the original building.

== Description ==
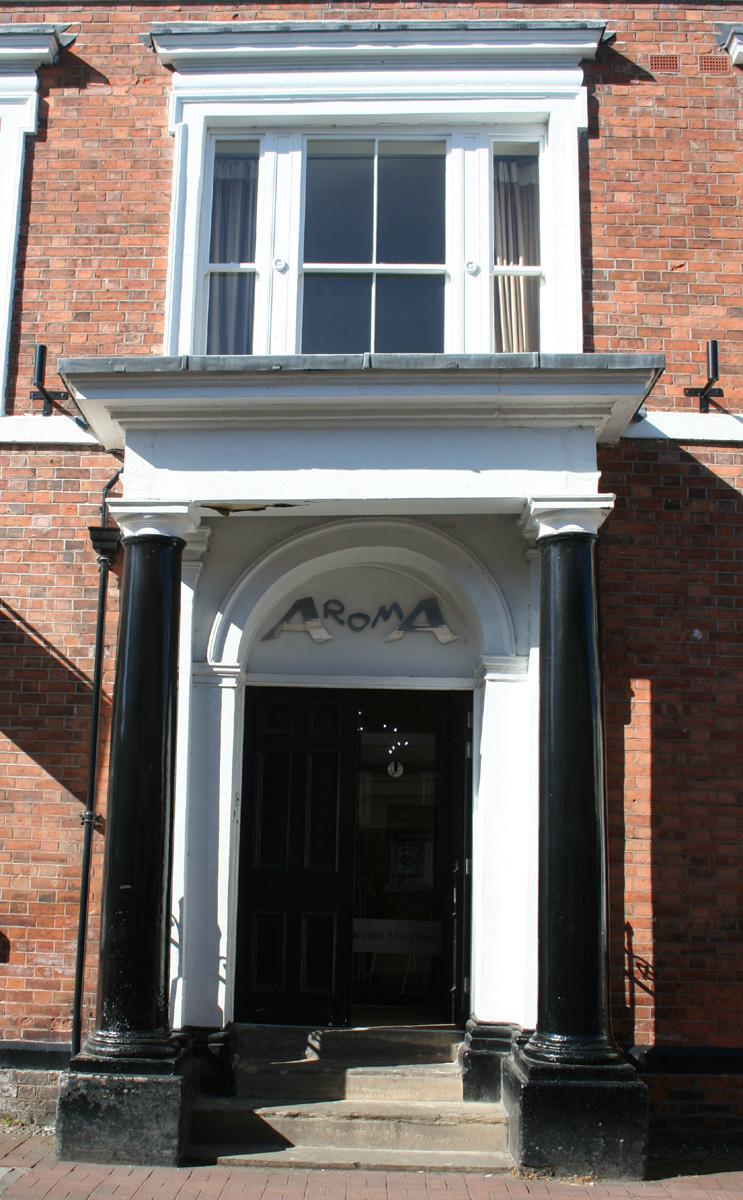
Portico and three-light window

The former Lamb Hotel is a large corner building, in red brick with stone dressings under a slate roof. The main three-storey building has slightly projecting end two-bay sections and a central three-bay section. The two end bays have decorative stone quoins at the ground-floor level. There are stone bands between ground and first floors, and first and second floors.

The windows of the three-storey building have moulded stone surrounds. The ground-floor windows have stone sills, arched tops and keystones with decorative motifs, including a lamb's head. The first-floor windows have stone cornices; the central window at this level, above the portico, has three lights. The central bay has a portico with Tuscan columns flanking the main entrance, which is reached by a low flight of stone steps and features an arched head.

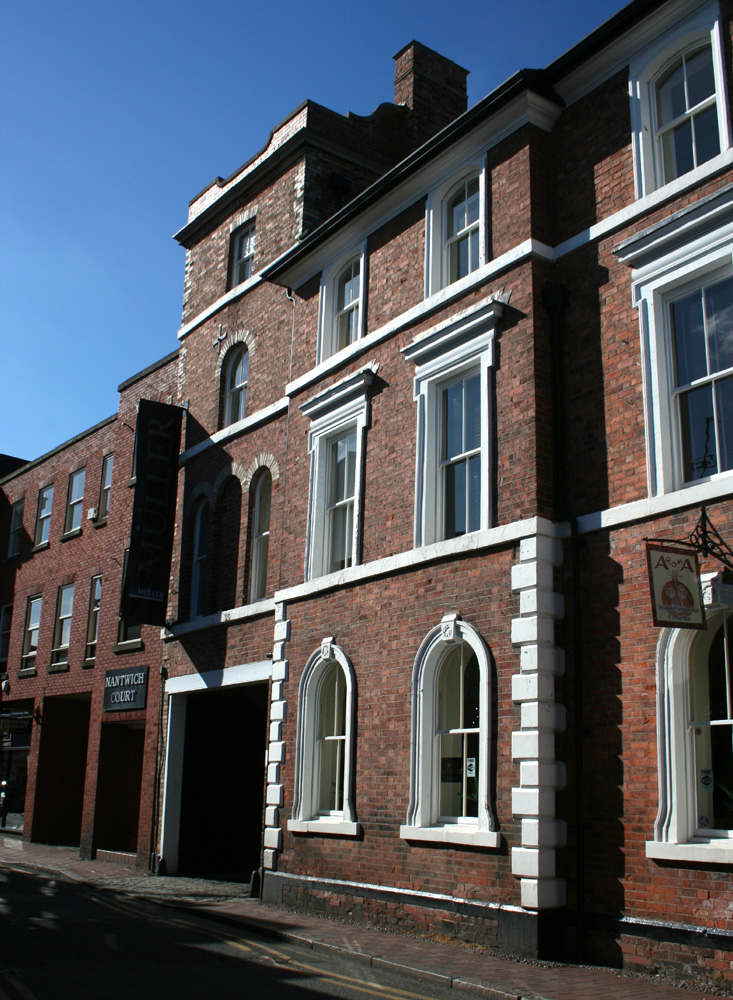
West bay and four-storey wing

At the west (left) side, a narrow four-storey wing is attached. In the original Bower design, this section was capped with a high concave roof to form a tower; this was demolished in 1937 and the wing is now completed with a brick parapet. The windows in this bay all have brick surrounds; the two first-floor windows and single second-floor window have arched tops, while the third-storey window has a horizontal top. It has a covered passageway with a horizontal stone top leading to a yard, which was preserved in the redevelopment. The original passage entrance had an arched top, matching the windows; this was altered some time after 1914. The stone bands from the main section continue, and are repeated between the second and third storeys.

Most of the Church Lane (east) face dates from the 21st-century redevelopment; it is similar in style to the front façade.

== Modern use ==
Now known as Chatterton House, after the first landlord, the building is used for a variety of purposes including cafés and shops on the ground floor, with residential apartments in the upper storeys.

== See also ==
- Listed buildings in Nantwich
