= Listed buildings in Nantwich =

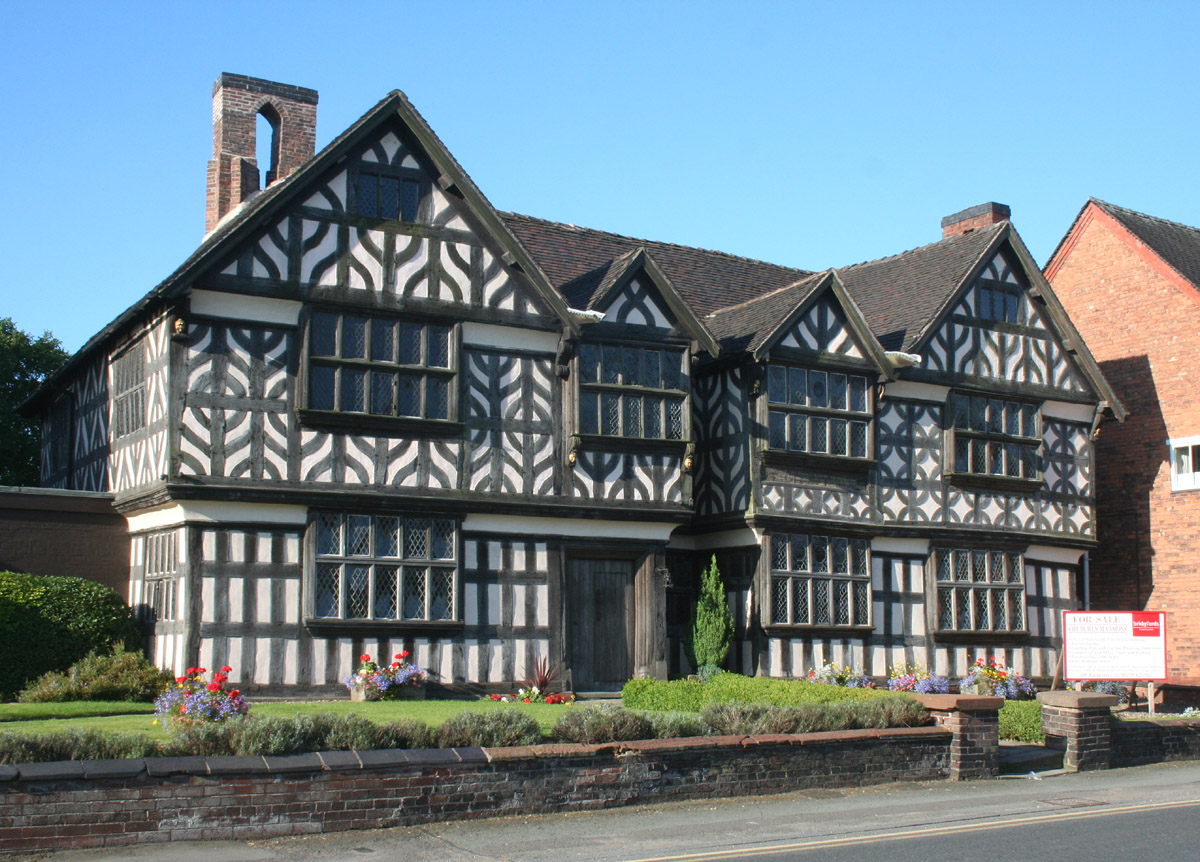
Churche's Mansion is one of three buildings in Nantwich to be listed at grade I

Nantwich is a market town and civil parish in Cheshire East, Cheshire, England. It contains 131 listed buildings and structures, with three classified as grade I, seven as grade II* and 121 as grade II. In the United Kingdom, the term "listed building" refers to a building or other structure officially designated as being of special architectural, historical or cultural significance. There are three grades: grade I denotes buildings of outstanding architectural or historical interest, grade II* denotes particularly significant buildings of more than local interest, and grade II includes buildings of special architectural or historical interest. Buildings in England are listed by the Secretary of State for Culture, Olympics, Media and Sport on recommendations provided by English Heritage, which also determines the grading. This list includes the listed buildings and structures within the boundaries of the civil parish of Nantwich.

Nantwich lies on the banks of the River Weaver on the Cheshire Plain. The town is believed to have been a salt-producing centre from the 10th century or earlier. A Norman castle was built at the crossing of the Weaver before 1180, probably near where the Crown Inn now stands. Although nothing remains of the castle above ground, it affected the town's layout. During the medieval period, Nantwich was the most important salt town and probably the second most important settlement in the county after Chester. By the 14th century, the town held a weekly cattle market at the end of Beam Street, and was also important for its tanning industry centred on Barker Street. A fire destroyed most of the town to the east of the Weaver in 1583. Elizabeth I personally contributed to the town's rebuilding, which occurred rapidly and followed the plan of the destroyed town. The salt industry peaked in the mid-16th century, with around 400 salt houses in 1530, and had almost died out by the end of the 18th century; the last salt house closed in the mid-19th century. Nikolaus Pevsner considers the decline in the salt industry to have been the critical factor in preserving the town's historic buildings. The town's location on the London to Chester road meant that Nantwich served the needs of travellers from the medieval era. This trade declined in the 19th century, however, with the opening of Thomas Telford's road from London to Holyhead, which offered a faster route to Wales, and later when the Grand Junction Railway bypassed the town.

The listed buildings are clustered particularly in the town centre on Barker Street, Beam Street, Churchyard Side, High Street and Hospital Street, and extending across the Weaver on Welsh Row. The great majority are located within the 38 hectares (94 acres) of conservation area, which broadly follows the boundaries of the late medieval and early post-medieval town. The oldest listed building is St Mary's Church, which dates from the 14th century and is listed at grade I. Two other listed buildings are known to pre-date the fire of 1583: Sweetbriar Hall and the grade-I-listed Churche's Mansion are both timber-framed, "black and white" Elizabethan mansion houses. A few years after the fire, William Camden described Nantwich as the "best built town in the county", and particularly fine examples of timber-framed buildings constructed during the town's rebuilding include 46 High Street and the grade-I-listed Crown coaching inn. Many half-timbered buildings, such as 140–142 Hospital Street, have been concealed behind brick or render. The town contains many Georgian town houses; good examples include Dysart Buildings, 9 Mill Street, Townwell House and 83 Welsh Row. Several examples of Victorian corporate architecture are listed, including the former District Bank by Alfred Waterhouse. The most recent listed buildings are 1–5 Pillory Street, a curved corner block in 17th-century French style which dates from 1911, and the war memorial which dates from 1921. The majority of the town's listed buildings were originally residential; churches, chapels, public houses, schools, banks, almshouses and workhouses are also well represented. Unusual listed structures include a mounting block, twelve cast-iron bollards, a stone gateway, two garden walls and a summerhouse.

== Key ==
Grade	Criteria
Grade I	Buildings of exceptional interest, sometimes considered to be internationally important.
Grade II*	Particularly important buildings of more than special interest.
Grade II	Buildings of national importance and special interest.

== Listed buildings ==
Name	Photograph	Grade	Date	Location^{[A]}	Description
St Mary's Church, Churchyard Side	St Mary's Church	I	14th century	SJ6521052324; 53.067015°N 2.520646°W	St Mary's is a large cruciform parish church in sandstone, sometimes referred to as the "cathedral of South Cheshire". Mainly in decorated style with later perpendicular additions, it was restored in 1854–61 by George Gilbert Scott. The exterior has an octagonal tower; the interior has an unusual stone lierne-vault above the chancel, carved oak canopied choir stalls (late 14th century), a perpendicular stone pulpit and a later wooden example (1601). The church was used as a prison during the Civil War.
Crown Inn, 24 & 26 High Street	Crown Hotel	I	c. 1584	SJ6507252357; 53.067303°N 2.522709°W	The Crown Inn is a timber-framed, three-storey black-and-white inn rebuilt shortly after the 1583 fire, and formerly the principal inn of the town. The street-facing front is flat and features close studding with a middle rail, lacking ornamental panels. There are slight overhangs at each storey, with carved brackets. The second floor has unusual continuous windows along the front; it was originally a single gallery, which was partitioned in the 18th century. An 18th-century assembly room lies at the rear. It was used as a place of worship during the Civil War.
Churche's Mansion, Hospital Street	Churche's Mansion	I	1577	SJ6562752150; 53.065478°N 2.514405°W	Churche's Mansion is a timber-framed, four-gabled black-and-white mansion house by Thomas Clease. The two storeys and attics all have overhangs; the corbels in the eaves are decorated with carvings of animals. The upper storeys have decorative panels. Originally the residence of the Churche family, the mansion has housed a school and later a restaurant; it is now a shop.
Wright's Almshouses, Beam Street	Wright's Almshouses, Beam Street	II*	1638	SJ654525^{[B]} 53.069°N 2.517°W	Wright's Almshouses are a terrace of six two-storey almshouses built by Sir Edmund Wright, in brick with stone dressings. They bear a central stone panel with arms. Originally on London Road, the almshouses were moved to stand adjacent to the Crewe Almshouses in 1973–75. They are now used as sheltered housing for the elderly.
Forecourt wall and gateway of Wright's Almshouses, Beam Street	Gateway of Wright's Almshouses, Beam Street	II*	1667	SJ6544652562; 53.06917°N 2.51715°W	The arched stone gateway to Wright's Almshouses is flanked by columns and side scrolls; it is surrounded by a low red-brick wall with a stone coping. Originally on London Road, the gateway was moved with the almshouses in 1973–75.
46 High Street	46 High Street	II*	c. 1584	SJ6509952305; 53.066837°N 2.522301°W	This timber-framed, two-gabled black-and-white merchant's house probably dates from shortly after the 1583 fire, and was built for Thomas Churche. It has two storeys with attics, with ornamental panelling, jetties and corbels decorated with carved human figures and animals. It is now a shop and coffee shop.
9 Mill Street	9 Mill Street	II*	c. 1736; 19th-century additions	SJ6504852219; 53.066061°N 2.523053°W	This five-bay town house in red brick with stone dressings has two storeys with attics. The slightly projecting central bay is flanked by brick pilasters and topped with a pediment. There is a cornice with a parapet above. Formerly used as a bank and a political club, it is now a restaurant.
Dysart Buildings, 1–9 Monks Lane	Dysart Buildings, Monks Lane	II*	1778–79	SJ6534252361; 53.067356°N 2.518681°W	Dysart Buildings is a terrace of nine three-storey town houses in red brick, with projecting bays at the ends of the terrace. It was built by Lionel Tollemache, fifth Earl of Dysart.
Townwell House, 52 Welsh Row	Townwell House, 52 Welsh Row	II*	1740	SJ6478852439; 53.068021°N 2.526957°W	Townwell House is a town house of three storeys and five bays, in red brick with stone dressings. It has decorative quoins and a stone string course. A contemporary two-storey coach house stands at the rear.
83 Welsh Row	83 Welsh Row	II*	Late 18th century	SJ6466852394; 53.067609°N 2.528742°W	This town house in red brick has five storeys and five bays, with a stone cornice. The central slightly projecting bay is topped a pediment. By the main entrance are railings dating from the late 19th century. It is now used as offices.
Beehive Cottages, 120–126 Audlem Road	Beehive Cottages, 120–126 Audlem Road	II	18th century	SJ6570751046; 53.05556°N 2.513093°W	Beehive Cottages is a three-storey red-brick building with a gabled end to the road. Formerly a poorhouse, it is now four back-to-back cottages.
12 Barker Street	12 Barker Street	II	Early 17th century	SJ6506252191; 53.06581°N 2.522841°W	This L-shaped, two-storey black-and-white cottage has a timber frame infilled with bricks. The adjacent outbuilding is separated by a covered passage but shares the single roof. It is now partly used as a garage.
14 & 16 Barker Street	14–16 Barker Street	II	Mid 18th century	SJ6505952172; 53.065639°N 2.522883°W	This pair of three-storey town houses in red brick has decorative stone quoins. The stepped entrance to number 16 has 19th-century railings.
18 Barker Street	18 Barker Street	II	Mid 18th century	SJ6505452150; 53.065441°N 2.522955°W	Number 18 is a two-storey town house in red brick, with decorative quoins to the left side.
20 Barker Street	20 Barker Street	II	Mid 18th century	SJ6505052138; 53.065333°N 2.523014°W	Number 20 is a two-storey town house in red brick, with decorative quoins to the left side and an elliptical window.
Garden wall & summerhouse, 20 Barker Street		II	18th century	SJ6502352126; 53.065223°N 2.523415°W	This red-brick crenellated garden wall and small gabled summerhouse stand in the garden of number 20. The summerhouse has an arched entrance.
The Dowery, Barker Street	The Dowery, Barker Street	II	Late 17th century; substantial later alterations	SJ6504852124; 53.065207°N 2.523042°W	The Dowery is a two/three-storey house with a rendered front. It has a two-storey bay, topped by a prominent Dutch gable, two tall chimneystacks and a dormer window. It is now used as offices.
34 Barker Street	34 Barker Street	II	17th century	SJ6506252123; 53.065199°N 2.522833°W	Number 34 is an L-shaped, gabled, two-storey black-and-white cottage set back from the street on the junction with Waterlode and Shrewbridge Road. It has a timber frame infilled with bricks.
Former Nantwich Workhouse, The Barony	Former workhouse, The Barony	II	1780	SJ65295338^{[B]} 53.0763°N 2.5181°W	The former workhouse is a three-story red-brick building on a U-shaped plan. The symmetrical front has a slightly projecting central bay with a Venetian window, topped by a pediment bearing a clock face. After the workhouse closed, it formed part of Barony Hospital from 1930 to 1994, and is now used as offices for the National Health Service.
6 Beam Street	6 Beam Street	II	Late 18th century	SJ6507352448; 53.068121°N 2.522704°W	Number 6 is a small two-storey, red-brick town house, with an adjacent arched passageway. It is now used as a shop.
15 Beam Street	15 Beam Street	II	Mid to late 18th century	SJ6512752505; 53.068637°N 2.521905°W	Number 15 is a three-storey, red-brick town house, with an adjacent arched passageway. It is now used as a shop.
20 Beam Street	20 Beam Street	II	17th century	SJ6512652475; 53.068367°N 2.521916°W	This is a two-storey black-and-white cottage, with a timber frame with brick and plaster infilling. It is now used as a shop.
Crewe Almshouses, Beam Street	Crewe's Almshouses, Beam Street	II	1767	SJ6548152562; 53.069172°N 2.516628°W	Crewe Almshouses are a terrace of seven red-brick two-storey almshouses, built by John Crewe on the site of the town's House of Correction. It has a central projecting section, topped with pediment and bearing an inscribed stone tablet. It is now divided into 14 sheltered flats for the elderly.
4A Church Lane	4A Church Lane	II	Early 19th century	SJ6518852261; 53.066447°N 2.520968°W	This two/three-storey brick building forms part of the original structure of 9 Hospital Street. It has a multi-paned iron casement window to the first storey. It is now used as a shop.
Former District Bank, 1 & 3 Churchyard Side	1 & 3 Churchyard Side	II	1864–66	SJ6511952369; 53.067414°N 2.522009°W	The former bank is a Victorian Gothic, two-storey, gabled building by Alfred Waterhouse, in red brick with blue brick diapering and sandstone dressings. The left gable has an oriel window with the Manchester and Liverpool coats of arms beneath. Built for the Manchester and Liverpool District Bank, it is still used as a bank.
Barclays Bank, 11 Churchyard Side	11 Churchyard Side	II	1876	SJ6516052369; 53.067416°N 2.521398°W	The bank is Victorian Gothic, two-storey stone building by Thomas Bower. The main entrance and first-floor windows are flanked by columns and headed with a stone moulding; the ground-floor windows have pointed arched heads. Built for the Midland Bank, it remains in use as a bank.
Bollards in churchyard, Churchyard Side	A set of seven bollards, Churchyard Side	II	19th century	SJ6512752323; 53.067001°N 2.521885°W; SJ6517552350; 53.067247°N 2.521172°W; SJ6517852297; 53.06677°N 2.521121°W	These cast-iron bollards in the square by St Mary's have mushroom caps. There are a total of twelve in three sets: seven at the south-west corner of the churchyard, three at the north side of the churchyard, and two at the Churchyard Side end of Church Lane.
Whitewell House, 69 Crewe Road	Whitewell House, 69 Crewe Road	II	Early 19th century	SJ6588052336; 53.067166°N 2.510649°W	Whitewell House is a two-storey red-brick building set well back from the road, with a portico supported by narrow columns. It is now used as offices.
4 & 6 High Street	4–6 High Street	II	Early to mid-19th century	SJ6500852376; 53.067469°N 2.523667°W	Numbers 4–6 are three-storey town houses in red brick which form the corner with Waterlode. The Waterlode side of number 4 has a Venetian window. It is now a property agent's and shop.
Union Inn, High Street	Union Inn, High Street	II	Early 19th century	SJ6506552395; 53.067644°N 2.522818°W	The Union Inn is a three-storey rendered building with a projecting central bay which has a canted bay window to the first floor. It is currently used as a public house.
Regent House, 12 High Street	12 High Street	II	c. 1584; later alterations	SJ6502652380; 53.067506°N 2.523398°W	This timber-framed, three-storey black-and-white building, dating from after the 1583 fire, was constructed around the corner of the street. It retains original mullioned windows to the first and second storeys. In the late 18th century, the gables were replaced by a parapet-like structure. It is now used as a shop.
Warwick House, 16 & 18A High Street	16–18A High Street	II	c. 1584; later alterations	SJ6504252377; 53.067481°N 2.523159°W	This timber-framed, three-storey black-and-white building dates from after the 1583 fire. In the late 18th century, the gables were replaced by a parapet-like structure. It is now used as a shop.
18 High Street	18 High Street	II	After 1583	SJ6504952371; 53.067427°N 2.523054°W	This timber-framed, three-storey, black-and-white building was probably built after 1583 fire. It has a single gable, small overhangs, decorated corbels and a canted oriel window to the second storey. It is now used as a shop.
20 High Street	20 High Street	II	Late 18th century	SJ6505352367; 53.067391°N 2.522994°W	Number 20 has two storeys with an attic, in red brick with stone dressings. It has a Venetian window on the first floor and a single shallow gable finished as a pediment. Formerly the Griffin Inn, it is now used as a shop.
20A & 22 High Street	20A & 22 High Street	II	After 1583	SJ6505952363; 53.067356°N 2.522904°W	This timber-framed black-and-white building of two storeys plus an attic was probably built after the 1583 fire. It has a single gable and a second-storey overhang. As of September 2018 it is a chain coffee shop.
21 & 23 High Street	21–23 High Street	II	16–17th centuries; later alterations	SJ6509152366; 53.067385°N 2.522427°W	This two-storey, three-gabled, black-and-white building has a timber frame with brick infilling. Formerly a bank, it is currently used as shops.
28 High Street	28 High Street	II	c. 1900	SJ6508152347; 53.067213°N 2.522574°W	This Baroque-style three-storey building, in red brick with stone dressings, has modern stone facing to the ground floor. Originally the post office and later a bank, it is currently used as a shop.
38 High Street	38 High Street	II	Late 18th to early 19th century	SJ6509652328; 53.067044°N 2.522348°W	This three-storey building in painted red brick is now used as a shop.
Queen's Aid House, 41 High Street	'Queen's Aid House', 41 High Street	II	1584	SJ6512752298; 53.066776°N 2.521882°W	The Queen's Aid House is a timber-framed, single-gabled, black-and-white building, of three storeys plus attics, with overhangs at each floor. Built after the 1583 fire, it has a contemporary inscription thanking Elizabeth I for her aid in rebuilding the town. Non-conformist preacher Matthew Henry died in the house in 1714. It is now used as a shop.
42 & 44 High Street	42 & 44 High Street	II	c. 1584	SJ6509952314; 53.066918°N 2.522302°W	This timber-framed, double-gabled, black-and-white building dates from after the 1583 fire. It has two storeys plus attics, with overhangs at the attic level. It is now used as shops.
45 High Street	45 High Street	II	Early 17th century	SJ6512952283; 53.066641°N 2.521851°W	This small timber-framed, single-gabled, black-and-white building has two storeys plus attics, with overhangs. Formerly the office of the Nantwich Guardian and later an antiques' shop, it is now an estate agent's.
Ye Olde Vaults Inn, 48 High Street	Ye Olde Vaults Inn, 48 High Street	II	Early 19th century	SJ6510152293; 53.066729°N 2.52227°W	Ye Olde Vaults Inn is a three-storey building in red brick which is currently used as a public house.
50 High Street	50 High Street	II	Early 19th century	SJ6510352285; 53.066658°N 2.522239°W	This narrow three-storey building in red brick forms the corner of High Street and Mill Street.
52 & 54 High Street	52 High Street	II	Early 19th century	SJ6510452270; 53.066523°N 2.522222°W	This three-storey red-brick building has a curved front which forms the corner of High Street with Mill Street. Currently used as a shop, it is listed for group value with even numbers 42–50.
War Memorial, High Street	War Memorial	II	1921	SJ6512152337; 53.06713°N 2.52196°W	The war memorial consists of an octagonal shaft bearing a Calvary cross standing on an octagonal inscribed plinth.
Former Lamb Hotel, Hospital Street	Chatterton House (formerly Lamb Hotel), Hospital Street	II	1861	SJ6517252261; 53.066446°N 2.521207°W	Now known as Chatterton House, this large building on the corner of Church Lane was formerly the Lamb Hotel; the site housed an inn as early as 1554. The headquarters of the Parliamentarian forces were here during the Civil War. The main three-storey building, in red brick with stone dressings, has slightly projecting end bays, with a narrow four-storey wing attached including a covered passageway. Major rebuilding in 2004–6 converted the building to apartments, shops and a restaurant, retaining only the façade and front portion of the original building.
8 & 10 Hospital Street	8–10 Hospital Street	II	Early 19th century	SJ6516052247; 53.06632°N 2.521384°W	This red-brick building of two/three storeys is now used as shops. It is listed for group value with number 4 and 1–5 Pillory Street.
9 Hospital Street	9 Hospital Street	II	19th century	SJ6518552249; 53.066339°N 2.521011°W	This black-and-white building of two storeys plus attics is on the corner of Hospital Street and Church Lane. It has a sham timber frame to the original timber frame, with a first-floor overhang. 4A Church Lane forms part of the original building.
11 & 13 Hospital Street	11–13 Hospital Street	II	19th century	SJ6519252247; 53.066322°N 2.520907°W	This two-storey building with a roughcast finish is now used as shops. It is listed for group value with the Lamb Hotel and odd numbers 9–17, 21–25.
15 & 17 Hospital Street	15–17 Hospital Street	II	Unknown	SJ6520152246; 53.066313°N 2.520772°W	This two-storey red-brick building has a sham timber frame in addition to a timber frame that is probably original. Now used as shops, it is listed for group value with the Lamb Hotel and odd numbers 9–17, 21–25.
21 & 23 Hospital Street	21–23 Hospital Street	II	Early 19th century	SJ6521452241; 53.066269°N 2.520578°W	This three-storey red-brick building was probably built on an earlier 18th-century structure. It has an oriel window. Now used as shops, it is listed for group value with the Lamb Hotel and odd numbers 9–17, 21–25.
25 & 27 Hospital Street	25–27 Hospital Street	II	19th century	SJ6522152240; 53.066261°N 2.520473°W	This three-storey red-brick building, possibly based on an earlier structure, has an adjacent covered passageway. Its shop front with pilasters and a cornice dates from the 19th century. It is now used as a shop.
30 Hospital Street	30 Hospital Street	II	Early 19th century	SJ6521352223; 53.066108°N 2.520591°W	This three-storey red-brick building is now used as an estate agent's. It is listed for group value with even numbers 20–42, 46.
32 & 34 Hospital Street	32–34 Hospital Street	II	Early 19th century	SJ6522152222; 53.066099°N 2.520471°W	This two-storey red-brick building was built on an earlier timber frame. It is now used as a shop.
33 Hospital Street	33 Hospital Street	II	Late 18th century; 19th-century additions	SJ6528352260; 53.066445°N 2.51955°W	Number 33 is a three-storey detached house in red brick with stone dressings including a cornice. Two canted bays of two storeys were added in the 19th century.
36 Hospital Street	36 Hospital Street	II	Mid 19th century	SJ6522852222; 53.0661°N 2.520367°W	This three-storey red-brick house is now used as a shop. It is listed for group value with even numbers 20–42, 46.
38 Hospital Street	38 Hospital Street	II	Early 19th century	SJ6523352221; 53.066091°N 2.520292°W	This two-storey brick house is now used as a shop. It is listed for group value with even numbers 20–42, 46.
40 Hospital Street	40 Hospital Street	II	Mid 19th century	SJ6524152219; 53.066073°N 2.520172°W	Number 40 is a three-storey house in red brick with blue brick decoration. It has a stone cornice and an oriel window. It is listed for group value with even numbers 20–42, 46.
Vine Inn, 42 Hospital Street	Vine Inn, 42 Hospital Street	II	19th century	SJ6524652218; 53.066065°N 2.520098°W	The Vine Inn is a two-storey rendered building with a sham timber frame in addition to the original timber frame. There is an adjacent passageway. It is currently used as a public house.
46 Hospital Street	46 Hospital Street	II	19th century	SJ6525752216; 53.066047°N 2.519933°W	This is a two-storey rendered building with a sham timber frame in addition to the original timber frame, and a 19th-century inn front. It is now used as a shop.
47 Hospital Street	47 Hospital Street	II	Early 19th century	SJ6529852229; 53.066167°N 2.519323°W	Number 47 stands adjacent to the courtyard in front of the Methodist Church and was formerly the Preacher's House. It is a three-storey red-brick house with the main entrance to the courtyard.
Former Wesleyan Methodist Church, Hospital Street	Methodist Church, Hospital Street	II	c. 1808; facade 1876	SJ6531052249; 53.066348°N 2.519146°W	The former Wesleyan Methodist church is a two-storey, red-brick building, set well back from the street. A gabled façade with stone dressings was added in 1876. The church moved to the former Methodist schoolrooms opposite in 2009, and the building is currently vacant.
Sweetbriar Hall, 65 & 67 Hospital Street	Sweetbriar Hall, Hospital Street	II	Elizabethan, with much subsequent alteration	SJ6536252231; 53.066189°N 2.518368°W	Sweetbriar Hall is a timber-framed, gabled black-and-white building, built before the 1583 fire for the Wilbraham family. It has a projecting gabled wing and a pentagonal projecting flat-roofed bay of later date, both with overhangs. It was the birthplace of Sir William Bowman in 1816. It is now divided into two; one part is used as offices, the other is residential.
Old school at rear of Sweetbriar Hall, Hospital Street	Old school at rear of Sweetbriar Hall	II	c. 1701	SJ6536252249; 53.066351°N 2.51837°W	The former school is a two-storey red-brick building which was occupied by Joseph Priestley in 1758–61, when he was a local Unitarian minister.
69 & 71 Hospital Street	67–71 Hospital Street	II	Mid 16th century	SJ6537152230; 53.066181°N 2.518234°W	This timber-framed two-storey building was probably once part of the adjacent Sweetbriar Hall. The rendering and shop windows date from the 19th century.
94 & 96 Hospital Street	94–96 Hospital Street	II	Early 19th century	SJ6539752207; 53.065976°N 2.517843°W	This three-storey red-brick building stands on the junction with Pratchitt's Row.
116 & 118 Hospital Street	116 & 118 Hospital Street	II	Early 18th century, incorporating earlier structure; later alterations	SJ6548852178; 53.065721°N 2.516482°W	This two-storey rendered house has two shallow projecting end wings. The existing building incorporates an earlier structure on a medieval plan, with stone fireplaces and roof timbers dating from the 15th century.
122 & 124 Hospital Street	122–124 Hospital Street	II	Early 19th century	SJ6551652176; 53.065705°N 2.516064°W	This two-storey red-brick building has doorways which are set in arched recesses.
The Rookery, 125 Hospital Street	The Rookery, 125 Hospital Street	II	Mid 18th century, incorporating earlier house at the rear	SJ6558752192; 53.065853°N 2.515006°W	The Rookery is a large two-storey red-brick building with two projecting side wings, which faces Millstone Lane. The existing building incorporates an earlier structure at the rear, dating from the late 16th or early 17th century.
126 & 128 Hospital Street	126–128 Hospital Street	II	Early 19th century	SJ6553052174; 53.065688°N 2.515855°W	This two-storey brick building, now known as Weaver House, is currently used as a health clinic.
130 & 132 Hospital Street	130–132 Hospital Street	II	17th century	SJ6553652173; 53.065679°N 2.515765°W	This pair of black-and-white cottages has a timber frame infilled with brick. There is a bow window to the ground storey.
134 Hospital Street	134 Hospital Street	II	19th century	SJ6554452170; 53.065653°N 2.515646°W	Number 134 is a two-storey red-brick cottage with its gabled end facing the street. It is listed for group value with even numbers 122–126, 130–148, Nuthurst School and Churche's Mansion.
136 & 138 Hospital Street	136 & 138 Hospital Street	II	Early 19th century	SJ6555152162; 53.065581°N 2.51554°W	This is a three-storey red-brick town house.
140 & 142 Hospital Street	140 & 142 Hospital Street	II	Late 16th century, with 17th/18th-century alterations and additions	SJ6557452166; 53.065619°N 2.515198°W	This large timber-framed building of two storeys and attics features an overhanging upper storey with continuous jettying; it has a predominantly rendered finish. Believed to occupy the site of the medieval Hospital of St Nicholas, which gives Hospital Street its name, the present building was built by John Crewe, father of Randolph Crewe, who became Lord Chief Justice.
144 Hospital Street	144 Hospital Street	II	Early 19th century	SJ6558952158; 53.065548°N 2.514973°W	Number 144 is a small two-storey house in red brick. It is listed for group value with even numbers 122–126, 130–148, Nuthurst School and Churche's Mansion.
Nuthurst School, Hospital Street	Nuthurst School, Hospital Street	II	1820	SJ6558852146; 53.06544°N 2.514987°W	Nuthurst School is a two-storey building in red brick with stone dressings, located at the rear of number 144. It has a stone parapet with an inscribed central panel, which formerly read "Nuthurst School" and now reads "Register Office". Formerly a private school, it is now residential.
146 Hospital Street	146 Hospital Street	II	Late 18th century	SJ6559752164; 53.065602°N 2.514854°W	Number 146 is a two-storey red-brick town house with a slight central recess.
Combermere House, 148 Hospital Street	148 Hospital Street	II	Mid 18th century	SJ6561152154; 53.065513°N 2.514644°W	Combermere House is a two-storey red-brick detached building with a projecting bay topped with a parapet. The building was remodelled by local architect Thomas Bower in the 1890s. Formerly Nuthurst Garden School, it is now residential.
Walled garden north of 82–96 Welsh Row, Kings Lane	Garden wall to Townsend House	II	c. 1580	SJ6463152474; 53.068325°N 2.529303°W	The remains of the walled garden to Townsend House on Welsh Row, now demolished, comprise three sides of a square of red-brick walls up to 3 metres (9.8 ft) high with a stone plinth and decorative coping, and incorporate bee boles. At the date of listing (1986), a small doorway with a stone lintel stood to the north, but this section of wall is no longer standing.
Marsh Lane Bridge Number 91	Marsh Lane Bridge	II	c. 1826	SJ6411451639; 53.060785°N 2.536921°W	This roadbridge over the Shropshire Union Canal is in blue brick and stone. The consultant was Thomas Telford.
7 Mill Street	7 Mill Street	II	Early to mid-19th century	SJ6506352240; 53.066251°N 2.522831°W	This curved three-storey red-brick building forms the corner of Mill Street and Barker Street. The ground-floor shop window is set back with columns. It is now used as a shop.
Former Congregational Chapel, Monks Lane	Former Congregational Chapel, Monks Lane	II	1842	SJ6529752331; 53.067084°N 2.519349°W	The two-storey former Congregational chapel is in red brick with stone dressings, and has a pediment with an inscribed stone plaque supported by large pilasters. The building has been converted to residential use.
1–5 Pillory Street & 2 Hospital Street	1–5 Pillory Street	II	1911	SJ6513252244; 53.066291°N 2.521802°W	This V-shaped building by Ernest H. Edleston is in the French Baroque style of the late 17th century. Constructed of partially rendered red brick, it has two storeys with a double attic. Its rounded corner forms the junction of Hospital and Pillory Street and is capped with a small concave spirelet with a mast. Built as Chesters' Stores, a grocer's, it remains in use as a shop.
52–62 Pillory Street	60–62 Pillory Street	II	Late 18th to early 19th century	SJ6519252143; 53.065387°N 2.520895°W	This terrace of six two-storey red-brick cottages is predominantly residential; number 52 is used as a shop and has shop fronts dating from the 19th–20th century.
Shrewbridge Lodge, Shrewbridge Road	Shrewbridge Lodge	II	17th to 18th century	SJ6498251005; 53.055144°N 2.523905°W	Shrewbridge Lodge is a timber-framed black-and-white cottage, which is partially roughcast with some sham timbering. Formerly an inn, it is now divided into two cottages.
Nantwich Bridge, Welsh Row	Nantwich Bridge	II	1803	SJ6495352391; 53.067601°N 2.524489°W	Nantwich Bridge is a single-span arched stone bridge over the River Weaver which has a stone balustrade. It replaces a stone bridge of 1664, which itself replaced the original timber bridge.
20–22 Welsh Row	20–22 Welsh Row	II	Early 19th century	SJ6488352417; 53.06783°N 2.525536°W	This two-storey rendered building might be built on an older core. Two "salt ships", large wooden brine-storage vessels, have been discovered buried on the site. Formerly the Three Pigeons Public House, it is now a bar, restaurant and night club.
Former Widows' Almshouses, 26–30 Welsh Row	26–30 Welsh Row	II	1637, with 19th-century additions	SJ6486452420; 53.067855°N 2.52582°W	The former almshouses are black-and-white two-storey cottages on the corner of Second Wood Street with a timber frame infilled with bricks. The three oldest cottages were converted by Roger Wilbraham in 1676 into the Widows' Almshouses for six aged widows. Some 19th-century cottages were later attached at the rear. The buildings later became the Cheshire Cat Public House, now a restaurant, wine bar and hotel. A mounting block stands outside.
Mounting block, Welsh Row	Mounting block, Welsh Row	II	17th or 18th century	SJ6476652429; 53.06793°N 2.527284°W	The mounting block has four steps cut from a single stone block. It stands outside 26–30 Welsh Row.
Black Lion Public House, 29 Welsh Row	Black Lion, Welsh Row	II	1664	SJ6485652392; 53.067603°N 2.525937°W	The Black Lion is a single-gabled black-and-white building of three storeys, each with slight overhangs. The timber frame has brick and plaster infilling. There is a 19th-century canted bay window on the ground storey. It is currently used as a public house.
33 & 35 Welsh Row	33–37 Welsh Row	II	Early 19th century	SJ6484852396; 53.067639°N 2.526056°W	This three-storey red-brick house might be built on an older core. It has 19th-century shop fronts. Currently, number 33 is a house and 35 is used as a restaurant. It is listed for group value with odd numbers 29, 33–47 and 55–57.
37 Welsh Row	33–37 Welsh Row	II	Early to mid-19th century	SJ6484552400; 53.067674°N 2.526102°W	This three-storey red-brick house, with late-19th-century shop fronts, stands on the junction with St Anne's Lane. It is currently used as a restaurant (with number 35). It is listed for group value with odd numbers 29, 33–47 and 55–57.
39 Welsh Row	39 Welsh Row	II	1846	SJ6482352398; 53.067655°N 2.52643°W	Number 39 is a single-storey building in red brick with stone dressings and blue brick diapering, on the junction with St Anne's Lane. The central projecting bay has a mullioned and transomed bay window topped with a stone balustrade, and is capped by a shaped gable bearing an inscription and finished with a stone coping. Originally a savings bank, the building is currently used as offices.
41–47 Welsh Row	41–47 Welsh Row	II	Mid 19th century	SJ6480352407; 53.067735°N 2.526729°W	These two-storey terraced houses are in red brick with some rendering. Currently residential with one shop, they are listed for group value with odd numbers 29, 33–47 and 55–57.
42 & 44 Welsh Row	42–44 Welsh Row	II	Late 18th century, with later alterations	SJ6481952426; 53.067906°N 2.526492°W	This pair of two-storey red-brick town houses has a parapet with a stone coping. Number 42 has a 19th-century shop front.
46 & 48 Welsh Row	48 Welsh Row	II	17th century or earlier; 19th-century addition	SJ6481452430; 53.067942°N 2.526568°W	Number 48 is a single-gabled black-and-white building with a timber frame and brick and plaster infilling, which projects into the street. The two storeys with attics are all overhanging. A 19th-century two-storey brick building with an internal timber frame (number 46) is attached.
50 Welsh Row	50 Welsh Row	II	Mid 18th century	SJ6480452439; 53.068022°N 2.526718°W	Number 50 is a town house of five storeys and four bays, in red brick with stone dressings. The sides have full-height brick pilasters. There are brick bands between storeys and a cornice at eaves level. The entrance is placed asymmetrically.
54 Welsh Row	54 Welsh Row	II	Mid 18th century	SJ6477552443; 53.068056°N 2.527151°W	Number 54 is a three-storey town house in red brick. A large stone arched passage on the right leads to the rear of this property and the adjacent Townwell House.
55 Welsh Row	55 Welsh Row	II	Early to mid-19th century	SJ6476452407; 53.067732°N 2.527311°W	This two-storey town house in red brick has an additional horizontal-topped entrance to the left side.
56 Welsh Row	56 Welsh Row	II	18th century	SJ6476952436; 53.067993°N 2.52724°W	This three-storey town house in painted brick has a modern front. It is listed for group value with even numbers 42–92.
57 Welsh Row	57 Welsh Row	II	Late 18th century	SJ6475852403; 53.067696°N 2.5274°W	Number 57 is a tall three-storey town house in red brick with a triple window to the ground floor. It has a horizontal-topped passage to the right side.
Wilbraham Arms Public House, Welsh Row	Wilbraham Arms	II	Late 18th to early 19th century	SJ6475752437; 53.068001°N 2.527419°W	The Wilbraham Arms is a three-storey building in painted brick with a sham timber frame. It has a central porch supported by wooden posts. Formerly the Red Lyon Inn, it remains a public house. It is listed for group value with even numbers 42–92.
The Gateway, 60 & 62 Welsh Row	The Gateway, 60–62 Welsh Row	II	Early 19th century	SJ6474552433; 53.067964°N 2.527598°W	The Gateway is a two-storey red-brick building, which was formerly the stable entrance to the Porch House. Its projecting central bay, capped with a pediment, has a prominent central archway framed by a large arched-top recess. The windows to the flanking wings and sides are in similar recesses.
The Porch House, 64A & 64B Welsh Row	The Porch House	II	Late 18th century	SJ6471452454; 53.068151°N 2.528062°W	The Porch House is a large, L-shaped three-storey house in red brick, built around a courtyard, on the site of a 15th-century mansion. It is accessed via The Gateway, and is currently divided into two houses.
64 Welsh Row	64 Welsh Row	II	Late 18th century	SJ6472652444; 53.068062°N 2.527882°W	Number 64 is a town house of four bays in red brick, set well back from the street. It has two storeys at the front and three at the rear. The entrance is placed asymmetrically with a modern porch. It is currently used as offices.
The Hawthorns, 66 & 68 Welsh Row	66–68 Welsh Row	II	Late 18th century, with 19th-century additions	SJ6471152442; 53.068043°N 2.528106°W	The Hawthorns is a town house in red brick with stone dressings, set well back from the street. It has two storeys and six bays, and is currently divided into two houses.
71 & 73 Welsh Row	71–73 Welsh Row	II	17th century	SJ6471852398; 53.067648°N 2.527997°W	This two-storey black-and-white house has a timber frame infilled with plaster and cement. The leftmost bay has a sham timber frame.
84 & 86 Welsh Row	84–86 Welsh Row	II	Early 19th century	SJ6466352418; 53.067824°N 2.52882°W	This two-storey building in painted brick is built on an earlier timber frame. It has 19th-century shop fronts and is currently used as a shop.
85 Welsh Row	85 Welsh Row	II	Early 19th century	SJ6465252396; 53.067626°N 2.528981°W	Number 85 is a two-storey building in red brick, built on an earlier timber frame. It is listed for group value with odd numbers 83–85, 89–91, 97–109 and the Primitive Methodist Chapel.
Stable block at rear of 87 Welsh Row		II	Late 18th century	SJ6464452378; 53.067463°N 2.529099°W	This two-storey red-brick building is the former coach house and stables of number 83. It has a circular window and an archway.
89 Welsh Row	89 Welsh Row	II	Early 19th century	SJ6464252394; 53.067607°N 2.52913°W	This two-storey red-brick house is listed for group value with odd numbers 83–85, 89–91, 97–109 and the Primitive Methodist Chapel.
91 Welsh Row	91 Welsh Row	II	Mid 19th century	SJ6463552387; 53.067544°N 2.529234°W	This two-storey red-brick house probably incorporates an earlier building. It is listed for group value with odd numbers 83–85, 89–91, 97–109 and the Primitive Methodist Chapel.
Oddfellows Arms Public House, 97 Welsh Row	Oddfellows Arms	II	Early 19th century	SJ6462252389; 53.067561°N 2.529428°W	The Oddfellows Arms is a two-storey building in painted brick and is currently used as a public house. It is listed for group value with odd numbers 83–85, 89–91, 97–109 and the Primitive Methodist Chapel.
99 & 101 Welsh Row	99–101 Welsh Row	II	Early to mid-19th century	SJ6461152392; 53.067587°N 2.529593°W	Two-storey red-brick building, with a 19th-century shop front. Now a single house.
100 & 102 Welsh Row	100–102 Welsh Row	II	Early 19th century	SJ6455452412; 53.067763°N 2.530446°W	Pair of two-storey red-brick houses.
Former Primitive Methodist Chapel, Welsh Row	Former Primitive Methodist Chapel, Welsh Row	II	1840	SJ6460252372; 53.067407°N 2.529725°W	Two-storey red-brick former Primitive Methodist Chapel, set well back from the street, with a pediment bearing an inscribed stone tablet. The chapel closed in 2001; the building is currently partially used for housing.
103–107 Welsh Row	103–107 Welsh Row	II	Early to mid-19th century	SJ6458452388; 53.067549°N 2.529995°W	Two-storey red-brick terrace of three houses adjacent to Chapel Row, set back from the street.
106 Welsh Row	106 Welsh Row	II	Early 19th century	SJ6450652418; 53.067814°N 2.531163°W	Two-storey red-brick house.
Former Grammar School, 108 Welsh Row	Former Grammar School, 108 Welsh Row	II	c. 1860	SJ6448452429; 53.067911°N 2.531492°W	Large building in red brick with blue-brick diapering, with two storeys plus attics. It has a projecting central wing with two gables, an octagonal bell tower capped with a spirelet and latticed windows. Formerly a grammar school and headmaster's house, it was built by George Wilbraham after the Old Grammar School in St Mary's churchyard closed in 1858.
Old Grammar School House, 109 Welsh Row	Old Grammar School House, 109 Welsh Row	II	Late 18th century	SJ6457752381; 53.067486°N 2.530099°W	Three-storey red-brick former school, set back from the street. There are two bay windows to the ground floor.
Former Wilbraham's Almshouses, 112–116 Welsh Row	112–116 Welsh Row	II	16th century	SJ6444252448; 53.068079°N 2.532121°W	A row of black-and-white cottages, with a timber frame and modern brick infilling. Formerly Wilbraham's Almshouses, the cottages were altered by Sir Roger Wilbraham in 1613 to form almshouses for six poor men. Later substantially altered, the cottages now form a single residence.
Tollemache Almshouses, 118–128 Welsh Row	Tollemache Almshouses, 118–128 Welsh Row	II	1870	SJ6442852469; 53.068267°N 2.532332°W	The two blocks of almshouses were built by John Tollemache, possibly on the site of the medieval Hospital of St Lawrence, to replace the adjacent Wilbraham's Almshouses. Each block has three red-brick cottages of a single storey plus attics with two slightly projecting gabled end wings, latticed windows including two gabled dormers, and two prominent stacks. The gables all feature sham timber framing. Above each central doorway is a cast-iron plaque with the Tollemache arms.
125 & 127 Welsh Row	125–127 Welsh Row	II	Early to mid-19th century	SJ6453252382; 53.067492°N 2.530771°W	Three-storey red-brick house at the junction of Welsh Row and Marsh Lane. Number 127 has a modern shop front and a single-storey triangular extension across the corner. Currently used as a dental practice and a house.
129 Welsh Row	129 Welsh Row	II	Early to mid-19th century	SJ6450852388; 53.067544°N 2.531129°W	Two-storey red-brick house at the junction of Welsh Row and Marsh Lane; the front face is to Marsh Lane. Currently divided into two houses.
141 Welsh Row	141 Welsh Row	II	Early 19th century	SJ6448152393; 53.067587°N 2.531533°W	Two-storey brick house set back from the street, featuring multi-paned iron windows. Probably built on an earlier timber frame.
153 & 155 Welsh Row	153–155 Welsh Row	II	17th century; early-19th-century additions	SJ6443352412; 53.067755°N 2.532251°W	A two-storey timber-framed building (no. 153), set back from the street, with adjacent later two-storey red-brick building featuring a large projecting front (no. 155). The timber frame of number 153 is infilled with brick; the front was roughcast when listed in 1974, but has been exposed during subsequent renovation, ongoing as of 2010.
Tannery House, 165 Welsh Row	Tannery House, 165 Welsh Row	II	Late 18th century	SJ6438252446; 53.068057°N 2.533016°W	Detached red-brick town house on the junction with Welsh Row Head. It has three storeys and three bays.
Willow Farmhouse, Whitehouse Lane	Willow Farmhouse, Whitehouse Lane	II	1820s	SJ6592853140; 53.074396°N 2.510019°W	L-shaped rendered farmhouse of two storeys with attics.
Farm building, Willow Farm, Whitehouse Lane		II	1820s	SJ6593553179; 53.074747°N 2.509918°W	L-shaped two-storey farm building in red brick, adjacent to Willow Farmhouse.

== Notes ==
^{A} Location is given first as a grid reference, based on the British national grid reference system (or OSGB36) of the Ordnance Survey; and second as World Geodetic System 84 coordinates, used by the Global Positioning System. Data derive from grid references at English Heritage's Listed Buildings Online website, except where noted.

^{B} Locations for Wright's Almshouses and Nantwich Workhouse at Listed Buildings Online are incorrect; these locations are based on the Ordnance Survey.
