= Dysart Buildings, Nantwich =

Coordinates: 53.0673°N 2.5186°W

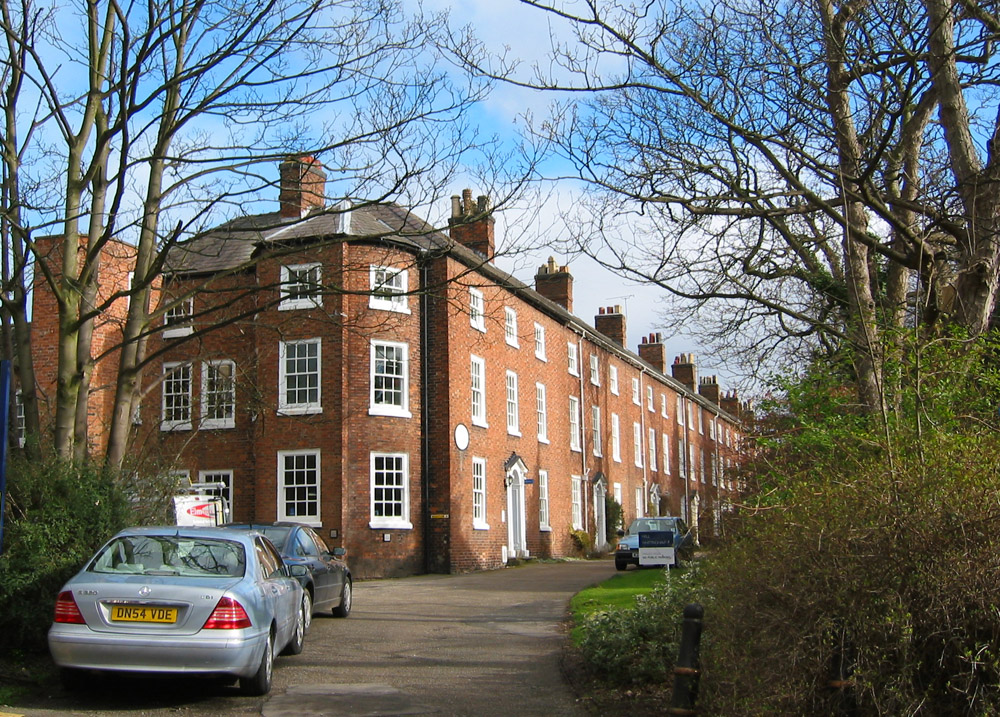
The west end of Dysart Buildings, Monks Lane

Dysart Buildings is a terrace of nine Georgian houses on Monks Lane in Nantwich, Cheshire, England. Dating from 1778 to 1779, the building is listed at grade II*. It is located at 1–9 Monks Lane (SJ6534252361), now a pedestrian walkway, opposite the former Congregational Chapel and immediately north east of St Mary's Church. Nikolaus Pevsner describes the building as "surprisingly metropolitan".

== History ==
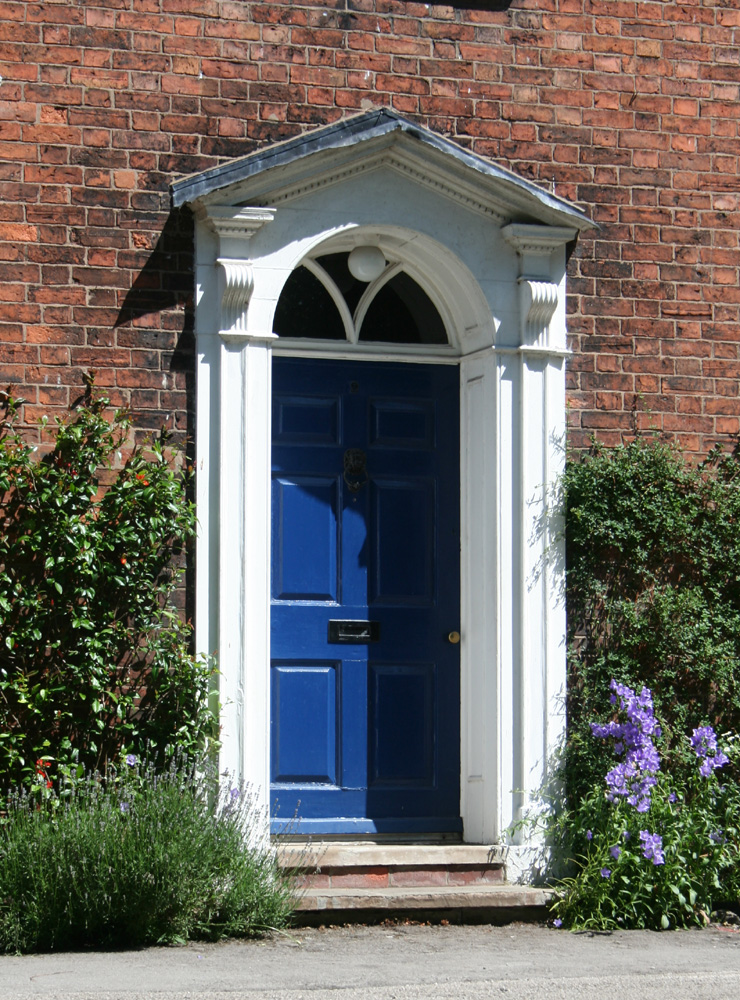
Doorway

The terrace was constructed in 1778–79 as a speculative project by Lionel Tollemache, the fifth Earl of Dysart, who inherited the land from an ancestor who married into the Wilbraham family in 1680. The Earl of Dysart was also patron of St Mary's Church in the adjacent parish of Acton.

== Description ==
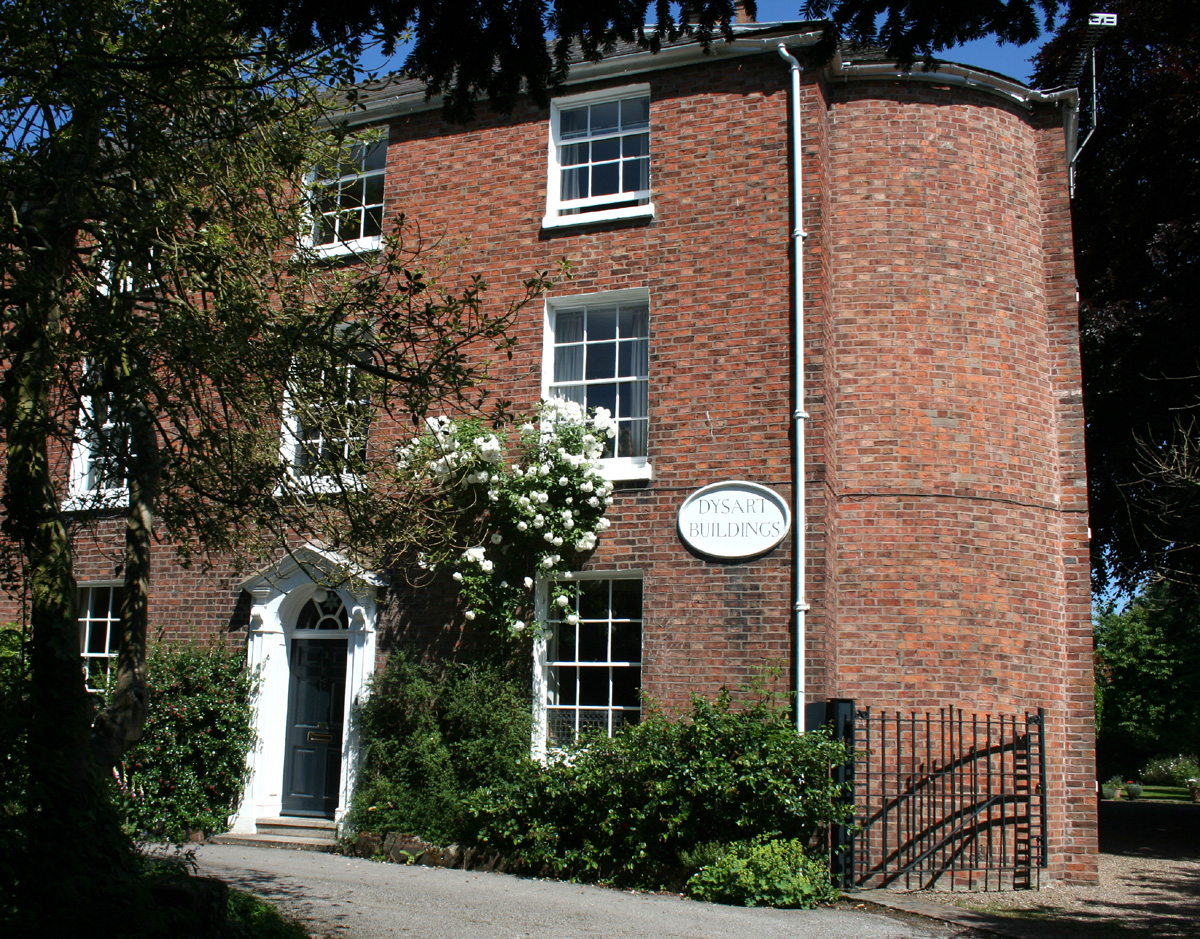
East end of the terrace with one of the plaques

Dysart Buildings is a terrace of nine three-storey town houses in red brick under a slate roof. The front (south) face is symmetrical, and Pevsner describes the terrace as "perfectly even". Each of the individual houses has three bays. The entrance doors all feature wooden doorcases with flanking pilasters and fanlights topped with a pediment; the windows all have plain tops and stone sills.

At the ends of the terrace are projecting bays. The west end has an additional later extension. Each end of the terrace bears an oval plaque with the name of the building.

== See also ==
- Listed buildings in Nantwich
