= Townwell House, Nantwich =

House in Nantwich, Cheshire East, England

Coordinates: 53.0679°N 2.5269°W

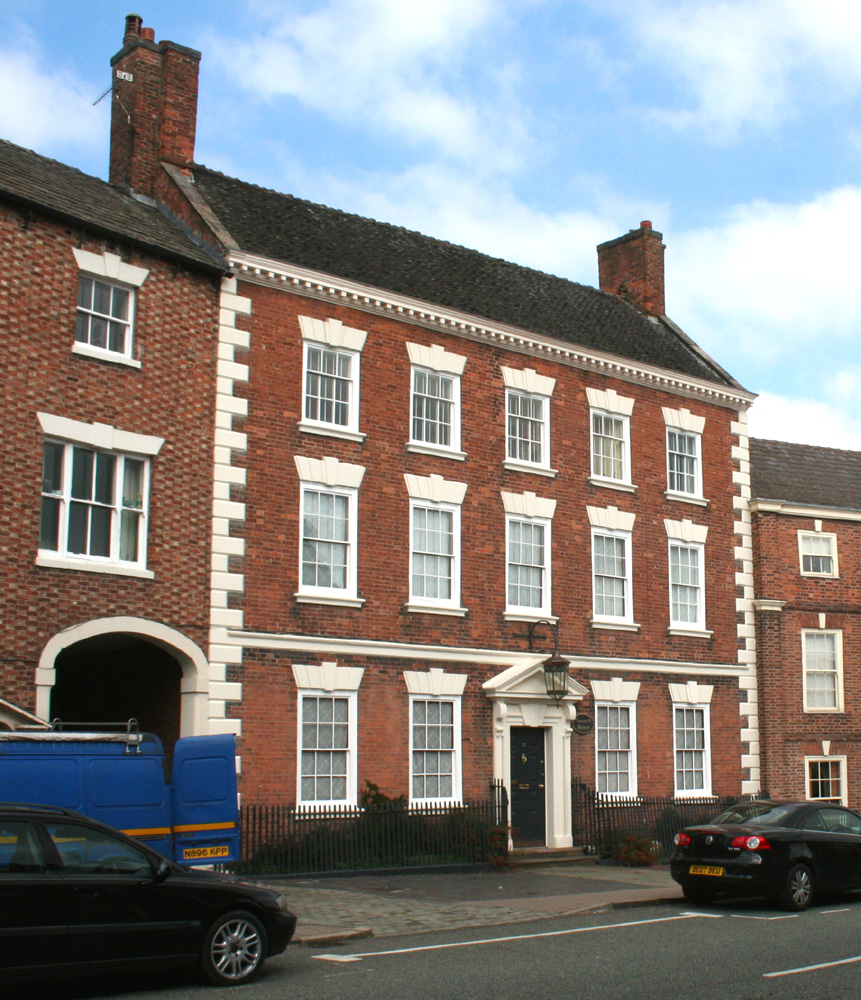
Townwell House, 52 Welsh Row, Nantwich

Townwell House is an Early Georgian town house in Nantwich, Cheshire, England, located at number 52 on the north side of Welsh Row (at SJ6478852439). It dates from 1740, and is listed at grade II*; in the listing, English Heritage describes the building as "important" and highlights its "good central entrance".

Townwell House is one of many Georgian buildings on Welsh Row, which Nikolaus Pevsner calls "the best street of Nantwich". Number 83, on the opposite side of the street, is also listed at grade II*.

== History ==
The house was constructed in 1740. As the name suggests, it stands on the site of one of the town's wells.

== Description ==
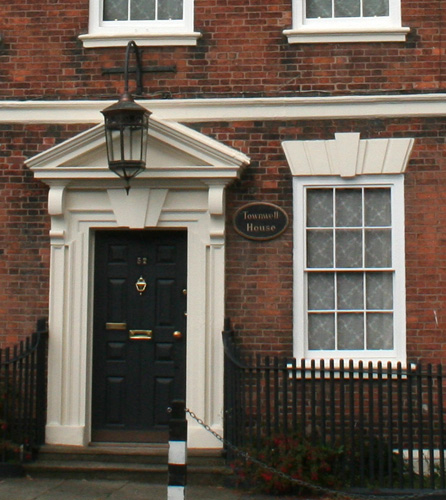
Entrance detail

Townwell House is a large town house of three storeys and five bays, in red brick with stone dressings under a tiled roof. The prominent doorway has a stone surround with triple keystone decoration above; it is topped by a pediment supported by paired corbels. The windows of the front face all have stone sills and a horizontal stone band above, decorated with a single keystone. One of the first-floor windows at the rear features an arched top. The quoins are decorative and a stone string course separates ground and first floor levels. At the eaves level is a wooden cornice. The interior features panelling.

At the rear of the house is a contemporary two-storey coach house and a walled garden.

== See also ==
- Listed buildings in Nantwich
