= 83 Welsh Row, Nantwich =

House in Nantwich, Cheshire East, England

Coordinates: 53.0677°N 2.5287°W

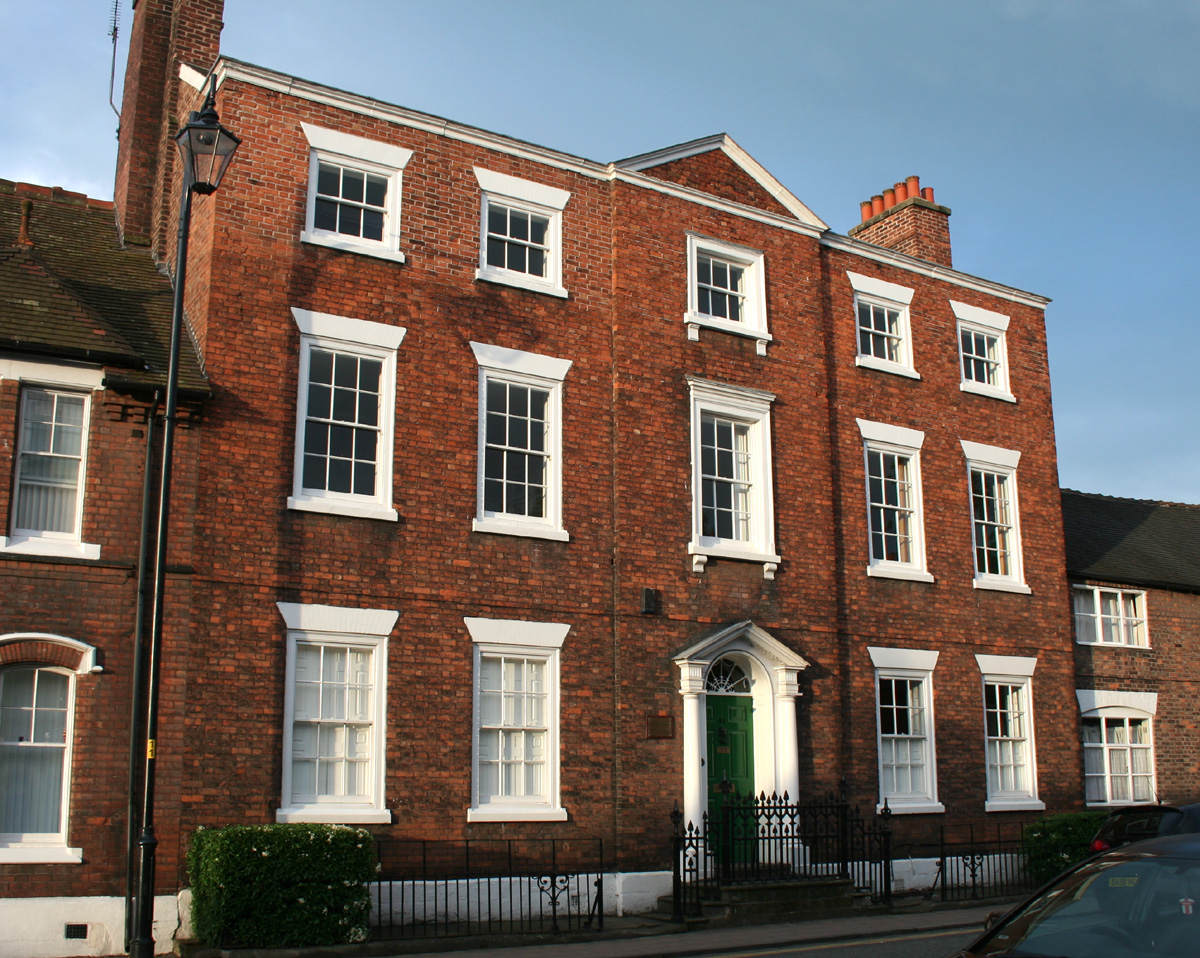
83 Welsh Row, Nantwich

83 Welsh Row is a Georgian town house in Nantwich, Cheshire, England, dating from the late 18th century, located on the south side of Welsh Row (at SJ6466852394). It is currently used as offices. It is listed at grade II*; in the listing, English Heritage describes it as "a good tall late C18 house", featuring a "good doorway".

Number 83 is one of many Georgian buildings on Welsh Row, which Nikolaus Pevsner calls "the best street of Nantwich". Townwell House, also listed at grade II*, stands on the opposite side at number 52.

== Description ==
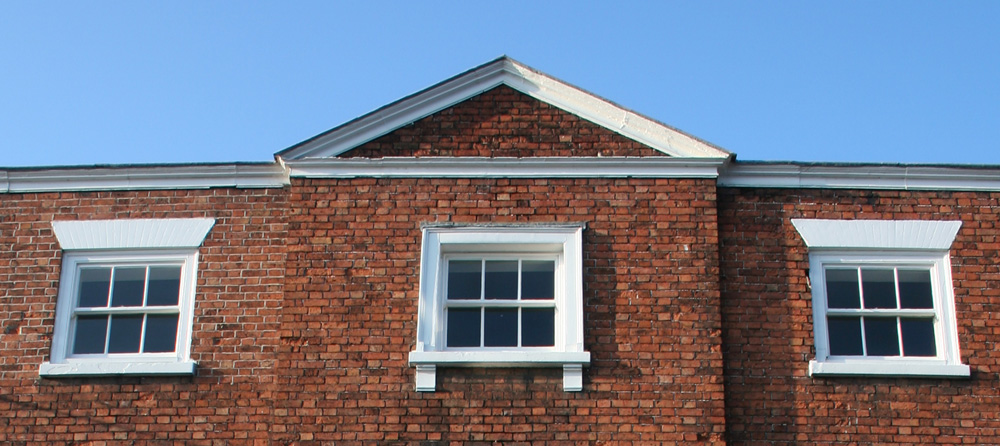
Pediment

The town house is a plain building in red brick, with five bays and five storeys topped by a stone cornice. The central bay projects slightly and is capped by a pediment. The two windows of the central bay have a stone surround with scrolls; the other windows have stone sills.

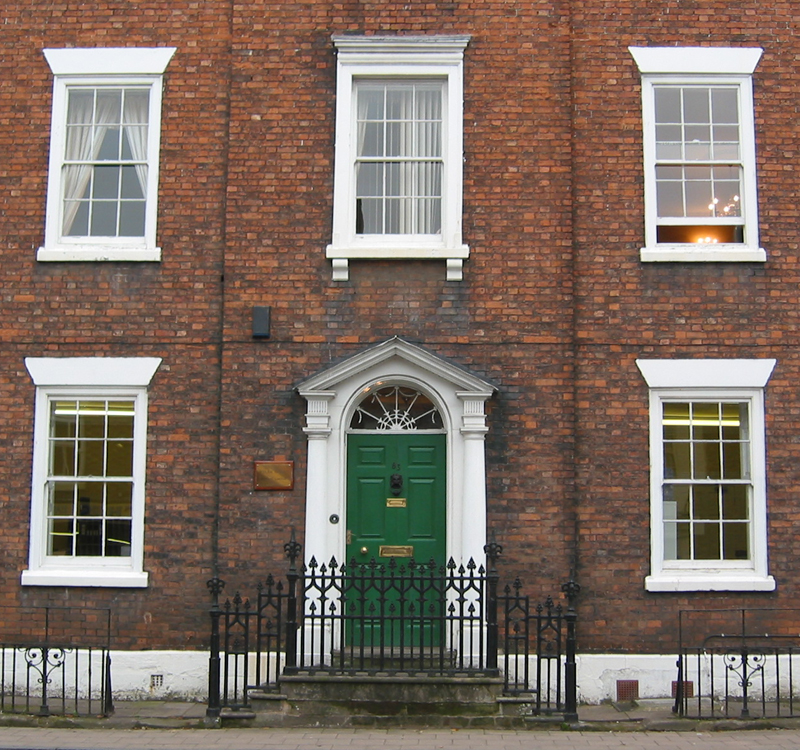
Entrance

The front entrance is reached by three stone steps to a small platform which has railings dating from the late 19th century. The doorcase features paired unfluted Roman Doric columns, and is topped by a fanlight and pediment.

One of the rooms on the interior contains 17th-century panelling, which was originally from another local house.

== See also ==
- Listed buildings in Nantwich
