= Crown Hotel, Nantwich =

Grade I listed pub in Cheshire, England

Crown Hotel
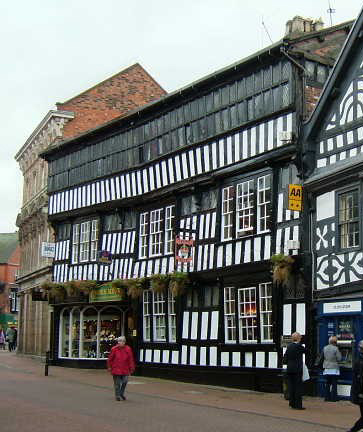
- Crown Hotel

- Location in Cheshire
- 53.0674°N 2.5227°W
- Location: 24–26 High Street, Nantwich, Cheshire, England

History
- Built: c. 1583

Listed Building – Grade I
- Official name: Crown Hotel and Former Coffee House Cafe
- Designated: 19 April 1948
- Reference no.: 1330054

The Crown Hotel, also known as the Crown Inn, is a timber-framed, black-and-white hotel and public house located at 24 High Street in the town of Nantwich in Cheshire, England. The present building dates from shortly after 1583. One of three buildings in Nantwich to be listed at grade I, the listing describes the Crown Hotel as "an important late C16 building."

The existing hotel was built on the site of an earlier inn of the same name, destroyed in the Great Fire of Nantwich of 1583. This appears to have been constructed on an earlier industrial site, including a medieval tannery and an 11–12th century salt working. The area has also been speculated to have been the location of Nantwich Castle.

== Archaeological findings ==
It has been speculated that the site, which forms a high point in the town adjacent to the river, might have been the location of Nantwich Castle, which was built before 1180. Excavations behind the Crown Hotel in 1978 found evidence of terracing, perhaps representing a platform or mound, as well as a pre-medieval ditch, which might have formed the outer bailey of the castle. Roman pottery was also found in these excavations, including Samian ware and roof tiles.

The excavations of 1978 found medieval leather shoes and numerous leather offcuts, suggesting a tannery was located on the site during this period. A D-shaped oak timber was found which might have formed part of a tanning bench, as well as wooden bowls and platters and medieval pottery. Large amounts of burnt charcoal, coal and clay dating from the early post-Medieval period were uncovered; they are believed to represent an 11–12th century salt working on the site.

== History ==
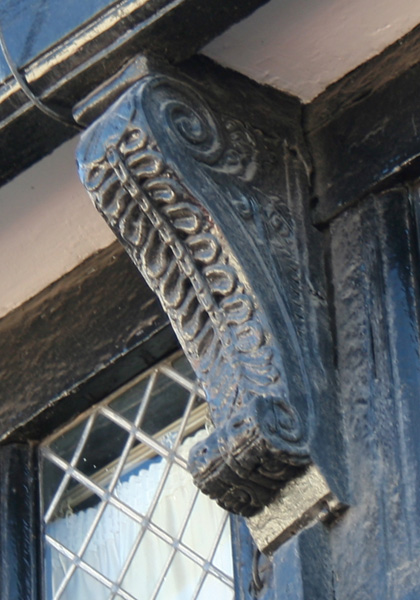
Carved corbel

The Crown was formerly the principal inn of Nantwich. Landlord Roger Crockett was murdered in a brawl on 19 December 1572, in a case that involved many of the town's gentry and was heard in the Star Chamber. The original "Crowne" was one of seven inns destroyed in the Great Fire of Nantwich of 1583. The proprietor at the time of the fire was Robert Crockett.

The present building is known to have been rebuilt shortly after the date of the fire. The cost of £313 13s 4d was the greatest of all the buildings rebuilt at that time; £240 was contributed by Crockett. The rebuilt Crown was a coaching inn on the Chester to London road. During the Civil War, the inn was used as a place of worship, while the parish church was a prison. The Duke of Monmouth dined at the Crown in 1682.

During part of the 18th century, the inn was known as the "Crown and Sceptre". The "Crown Inn Lodge", Nantwich's second Masonic Lodge, was founded in 1794 by Sir Robert Salusbury Cotton, MP for the county of Cheshire, and presumably met at the Crown; it had 28 members in 1799. Plays were put on in the inn's assembly room until a theatre was built in the early 19th century. The Crown is described in an 1874 directory as a "Commercial Inn and Posting House", one of two in the town (the other being the Lamb Hotel on Hospital Street). The Crown was run by the Piggott family for over 30 years from the late 1870s. Thomas Piggott, landlord in 1881, was the great grandfather of well-known jockey Lester Piggott.

== Description ==
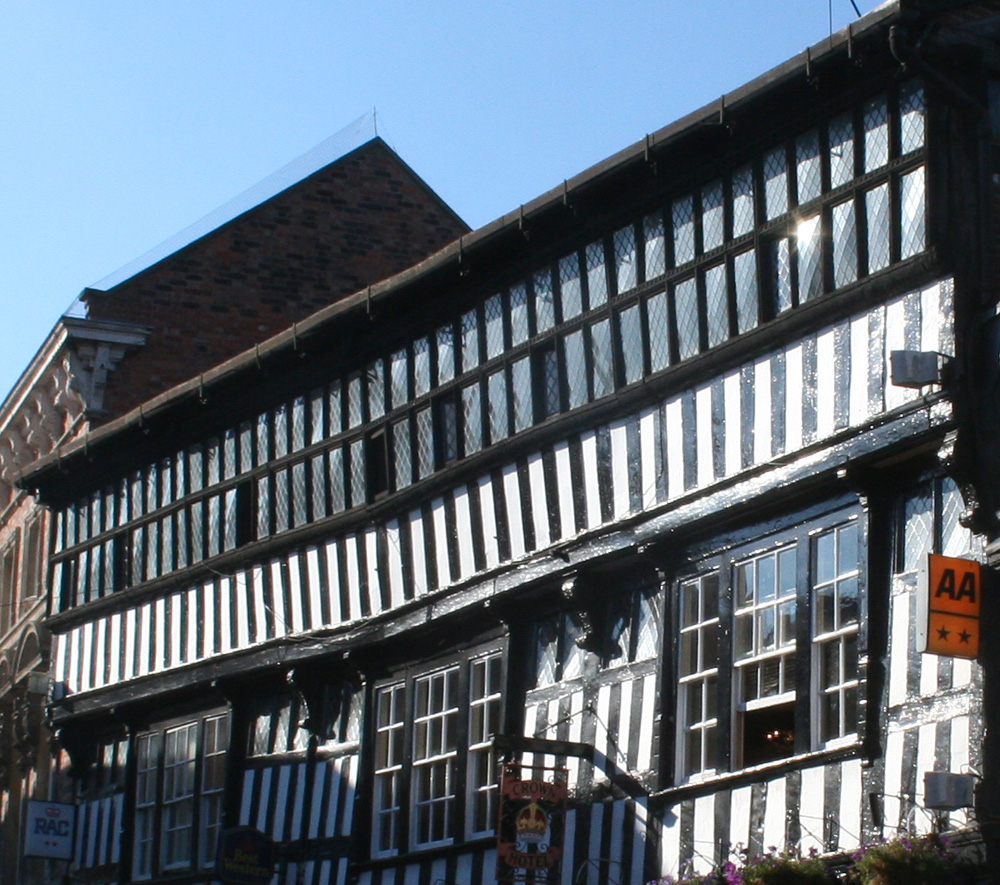
Second storey, showing continuous windows and overhang

The Crown Hotel is a black-and-white, timber-framed and plaster three-storey building with a tiled roof. The street-facing front, described by Nikolaus Pevsner as "impressive", is flat and features close studding with a middle rail. Unlike many buildings of a similar date in the town, it lacks ornamental panelling. Each storey has small overhangs, with carved corbels (brackets). All three storeys have restored mullioned and transomed windows in oak. The second (top) floor features unusual continuous windows along the entire front.

To the left of the street front is a covered passage known as Crown Mews, which was the entrance to the inn's stables at the rear. On the left of the passage is a recessed shop front; formerly a coffee shop, as of 2009 it houses a jeweller's.

The interior is in good condition. The ground floor features an 18th-century enclosed bar and a wall panel showing the original wattle and daub construction. A large beam supported by scrollwork forms an archway to the rear, where there is an 18th-century assembly room. An iron mantrap is mounted on the wall to the rear of the archway. The second storey was originally a single gallery and was partitioned, probably in the 18th century.

== Modern hotel ==
As of 2009, the Crown is an eighteen-bedroom hotel and public house and restaurant. It renovated its restaurant to a grill restaurant in January 2016 and now serves a range of grilled meats, fish and other dishes. The Crown is licensed for civil wedding ceremonies.

== See also ==
- Listed buildings in Nantwich, Cheshire
- Grade I listed buildings in Cheshire
