= Wilbraham Almshouses =

Wilbraham Almshouses or Wilbraham's Almshouses may refer to any of several almshouses founded by members of the Wilbraham family, including:

- Old Maids' Almshouse, Welsh Row, Nantwich – founded by Roger Wilbraham (1676) (see Widows' Almshouses, Nantwich)
- Tollemache Almshouses, 118–128 Welsh Row, Nantwich (1870)
- Widows' Almshouses, Nantwich, 26–30 Welsh Row – founded by Roger Wilbraham (1676)
- Wilbraham's Almshouses, Acton – founded by Sir Roger Wilbraham (1613)
- Wilbraham's Almshouses, Barnet – founded by Sir Roger Wilbraham (1616)
- Wilbraham's Almshouses, Nantwich, 112–116 Welsh Row – founded by Sir Roger Wilbraham (1613)
