= Tollemache Almshouses =

Grade II listed building in Nantwich, Cheshire, England

Coordinates: 53.0683°N 2.5326°W

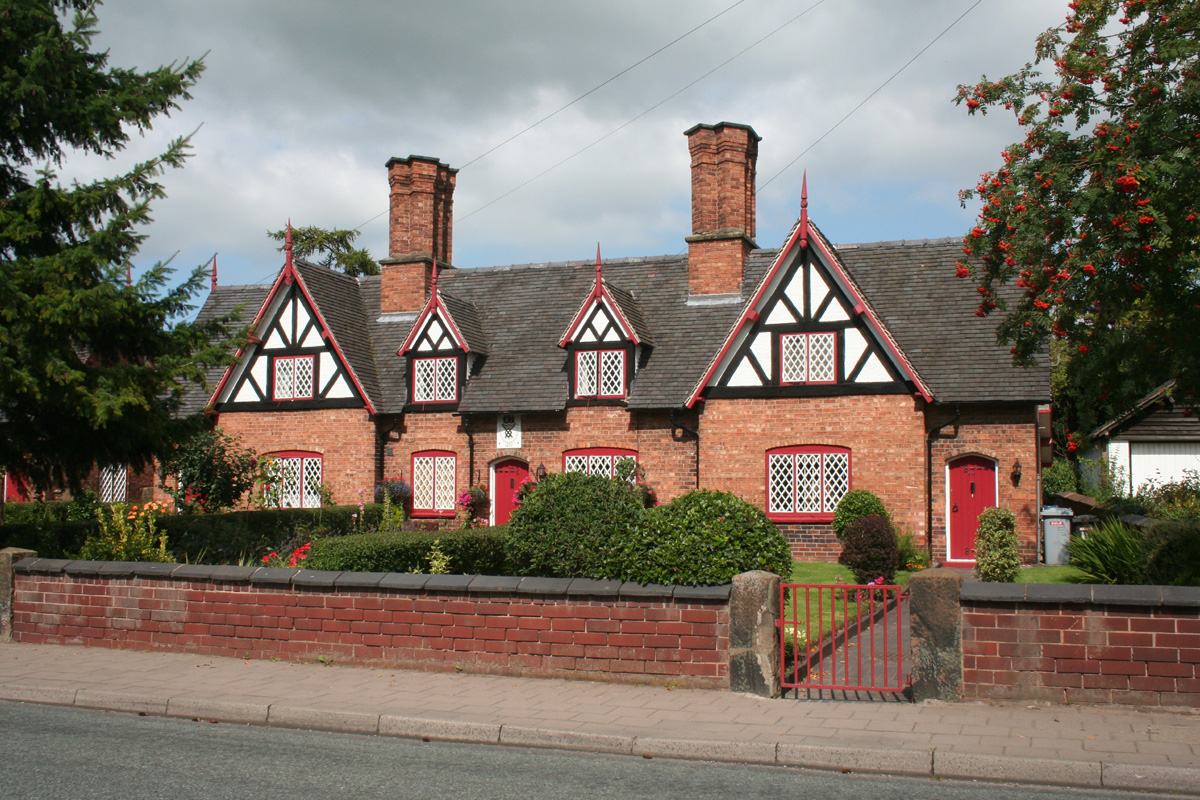
Tollemache Almshouses, 118–128 Welsh Row, Nantwich

The Tollemache Almshouses, also known as the Wilbraham Almshouses or Wilbraham's Almshouses, are six former almshouses in Nantwich, Cheshire, England. They are in two blocks of three cottages each, located on the north side of Welsh Row at numbers 118–128 (at SJ6442852469). The present buildings, which are listed at grade II, were erected in 1870 by John Tollemache (later created first Baron Tollemache) to replace adjacent almshouses founded by Sir Roger Wilbraham in 1613. The almshouses were modernised in 1980 and remain in residential use. The Hospital of St Lawrence, a medieval house for lepers, was possibly on or near the site of the present almshouses.

Nikolaus Pevsner considers Welsh Row "the best street of Nantwich". The street has many listed buildings and is known for its mixture of architectural styles, including timber-framed black-and-white cottages such as the Wilbraham's and Widows' Almshouses, Georgian town houses such as Townwell House and number 83, and Victorian buildings such as the former Grammar School, Primitive Methodist Chapel and Savings Bank.

== Hospital of St Lawrence ==
The Tollemache Almshouses might be located on or near the site of the Hospital of St Lawrence, a medieval house for lepers whose date of foundation is unknown; it became a hospital for the infirm poor in around 1348. The hospital is known to have been situated well outside the medieval town of Nantwich within the parish of Acton, by the western entrance to the town on what is now Welsh Row. Although associated with an area adjacent to the old almshouses by Joseph Partridge, author of the first history of Nantwich, there is little or no direct evidence as to its precise location.

== Wilbraham's Almshouses ==
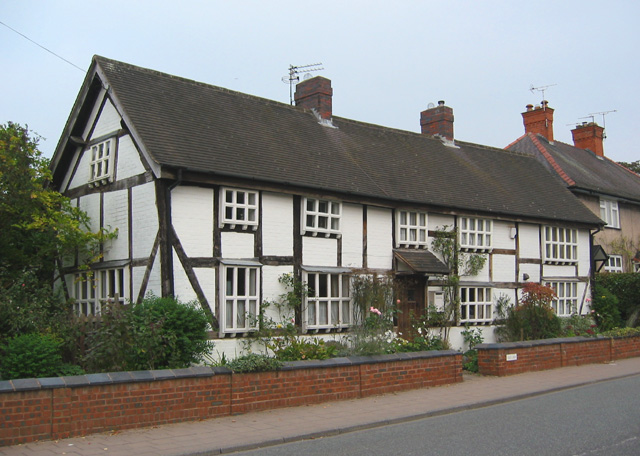
Wilbraham's Almshouses

In 1613, Sir Roger Wilbraham of Dorfold Hall founded almshouses for six poor men at what was then the end of Welsh Row (later The Maltkilns at numbers 112–116); they were the town's earliest almshouses. Wilbraham's Almshouses were maintained by the Wilbraham family until 1692, when responsibility for them passed into the Tollemache family because of the earlier marriage of Grace Wilbraham, the Wilbraham heiress, to Lionel Tollemache, the third Earl of Dysart.

== History of present almshouses ==
The present almshouses were built in 1870 by John Tollemache, a descendant of Sir Roger Wilbraham, to replace the Wilbraham's Almshouses which stood adjacent. Tollemache, of Peckforton Castle and Helmingham Hall, Suffolk, served successively as the Member of Parliament for South and West Cheshire, and was created the first Baron Tollemache in 1876. He was the largest landowner in Cheshire; in addition to the almshouses, he built more than fifty farmhouses and many cottages, and also donated the land for the Nantwich Market Hall.

The Tollemache Almshouses stand immediately adjacent to the Wilbraham's Almshouses, and were built on their gardens, at what was then the end of Welsh Row. Like the earlier almshouses, they accommodated six men; four were from Nantwich and two from the neighbouring village of Acton. In the 1880s, the inhabitants were old married men; their widows were allowed to remain provided that they "conduct themselves properly." Historian James Hall describes the almshouses at that time as "comfortable dwellings of two stories, with their gardens in front" which were "an ornament to the west end of the town". In 1892, the total annual endowment of the original charity was £12. The almsmen each received 10 shillings quarterly, a pair of shoes annually and £1 4s 6d every two years for other clothing from the Tollemache family. Additionally, increases in the original endowment by bequests from Peter Sprout and from Elizabeth and Mary Bennion, respectively, resulted in an extra £2 per head plus a share of £21 10s annually. According to a scheme dated 23 June 1870, the single trustee of the Wilbraham Almshouse Charity was John Tollemache, who selected the almsmen; the Tollemache family continued to maintain the almshouses until 1978.

In 1975, the almshouses were self-supporting, with a total annual income from maintenance contributions of just over £700, in addition to £18.30 from the Tollemache estate at Peckforton and £20 from the charity established by the Bennions. (The contribution from the Peter Sprout charity had ceased before 1939.) On 21 March 1978, a few years after the death of Major John Tollemache, fourth Baron Tollemache, the administration of the Wilbraham Almshouse Charity passed to the trustees of the Almshouse Charities of Sir Edmund Wright, Crewe and Others, which maintained the Wright's, Crewe and Harriet Hope Almshouses, although the charities remained separate. The almshouses were renovated and modernised starting 3 June 1980, at a total cost of up to £71,500. They were formally reopened on 24 November 1980 by Dinah, Lady Tollemache, widow of Major Tollemache.

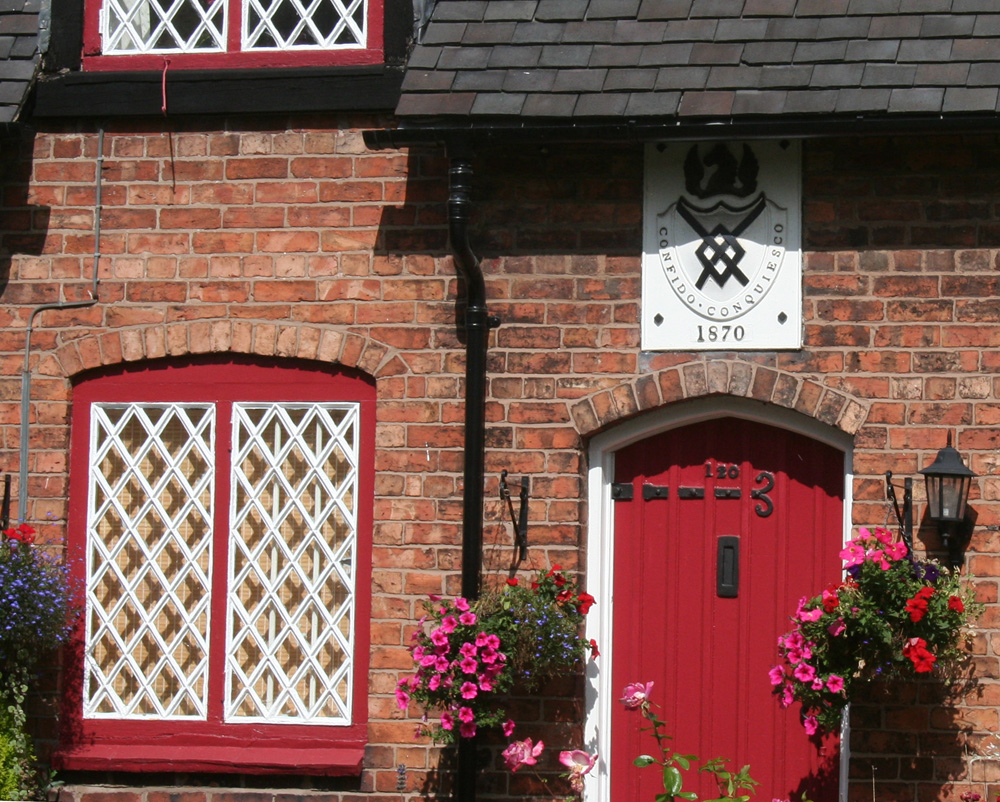
Latticed window and plaque

== Description ==
The almshouses are in two identical blocks set well back from the street behind a walled front garden. Each block comprises three red-brick cottages of a single storey plus attics under a tiled roof, with two slightly projecting gabled end wings. The gables have sham timber framing and slender finials. There are similar finials to the ends of the roof and two prominent clustered chimney stacks.

Each block has three unornamented doorways with arched heads. Above the central doorway is a cast-iron plaque bearing the coat of arms of the Tollemache family and the date 1870. The ground floor has four casement windows, one of two lights and three of three lights; there are four two-light casements to the attic floor, two of which are gabled dormers. All the windows are latticed in iron with a diamond pattern and have arched heads.

== Modern usage ==
The Tollemache Almshouses remain in residential use. They are run as a housing association, administered jointly with the Wright's, Crewe and Harriet Hope Almshouses by the Almshouse Charities of Sir Edmund Wright, Crewe and Others.

== See also ==
- Listed buildings in Nantwich
- List of almshouses in the United Kingdom
- Tollemache Almshouses, Ham, London, erected in memory of Algernon Gray Tollemache in 1892 by his widow

== Sources ==
- Bavington, G; et al. (1987). Nantwich, Worleston & Wybunbury: A Portrait in Old Picture Postcards. Brampton Publications. ISBN 0 9511469 6 3.
- Blacklay, F (1995). Almshouses of Nantwich. A4 Media Services.
- Garton, E. (1972). Nantwich, Saxon to Puritan: A History of the Hundred of Nantwich, c 1050 to c 1642. Nantwich: Johnson & Son. ISBN 0950273805.
- Garton, E. (1983). Tudor Nantwich: A Study of Life in Nantwich in the Sixteenth Century. Cheshire County Council Libraries and Museums. ISBN 0 903017 05 9.
- Hall, J. (1972). A History of the Town and Parish of Nantwich, or Wich Malbank, in the County Palatine of Chester (2 ed.). E. J. Morten. ISBN 0-901598-24-0.
- Lamberton, A.; Gray, R. (2005). Lost Houses in Nantwich. Landmark Publishing. ISBN 1 84306 202 X.
- Pevsner, Nicholas; Hubbard, E. (1971). The Buildings of England: Cheshire. Penguin Books. ISBN 0 14 071042 6.
- Simpson, R. (1991). Crewe and Nantwich: A Pictorial History. Phillimore. ISBN 0 85033 724 0.
