= The Gateway, Nantwich =

Late Georgian former stable entrance in Nantwich, Cheshire, England

Coordinates: 53.0679°N 2.5276°W

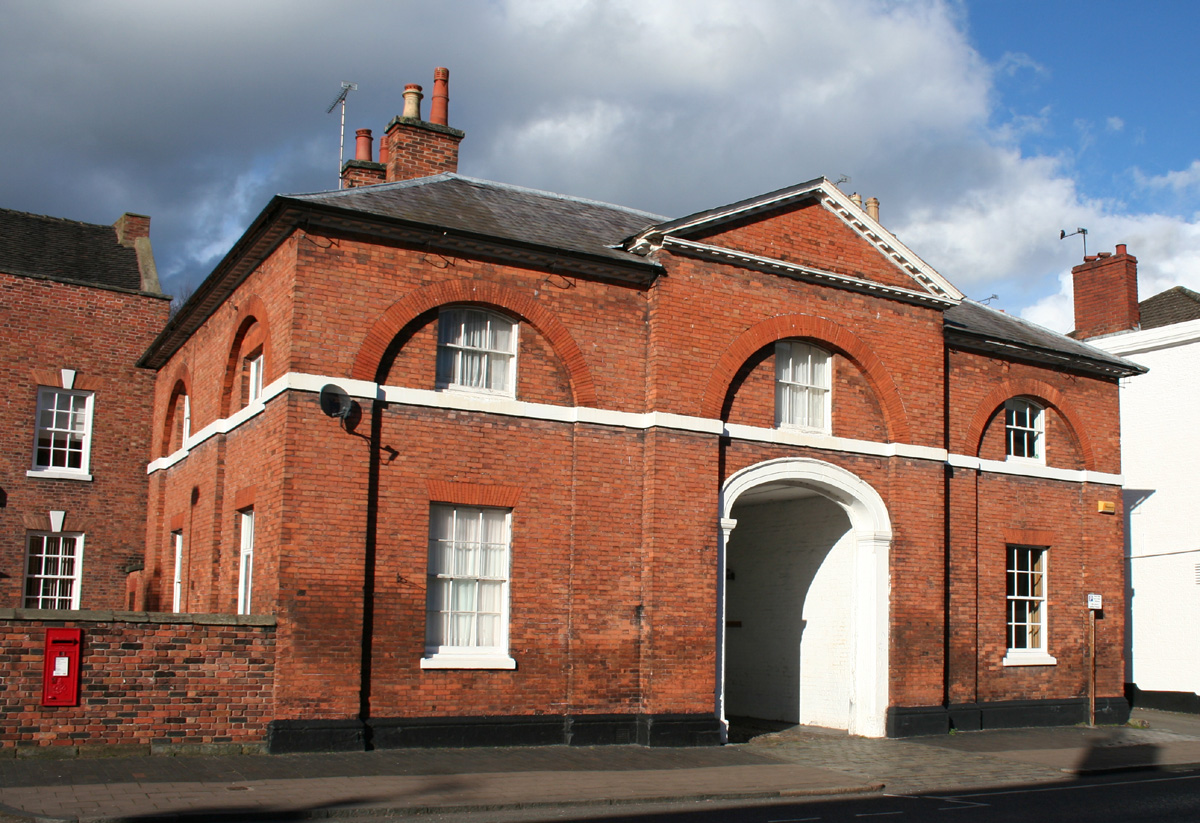
The Gateway, 60–62 Welsh Row, Nantwich

The Gateway, or 60–62 Welsh Row, is a Late Georgian former stable entrance in Nantwich, Cheshire, England, dating from the early 19th century. It is located on the north side of Welsh Row (at SJ6474552433), on the junction with Red Lion Lane. It is listed at grade II. Nikolaus Pevsner describes The Gateway as "handsome".

Pevsner considers Welsh Row "the best street of Nantwich". The street has many listed buildings and is known for its mixture of architectural styles, including other Georgian buildings such as number 83 opposite and Townwell House, black-and-white cottages such as the Widows' and Wilbraham's Almshouses, and Victorian buildings such as the former Grammar School, Primitive Methodist Chapel and Savings Bank.

== History ==
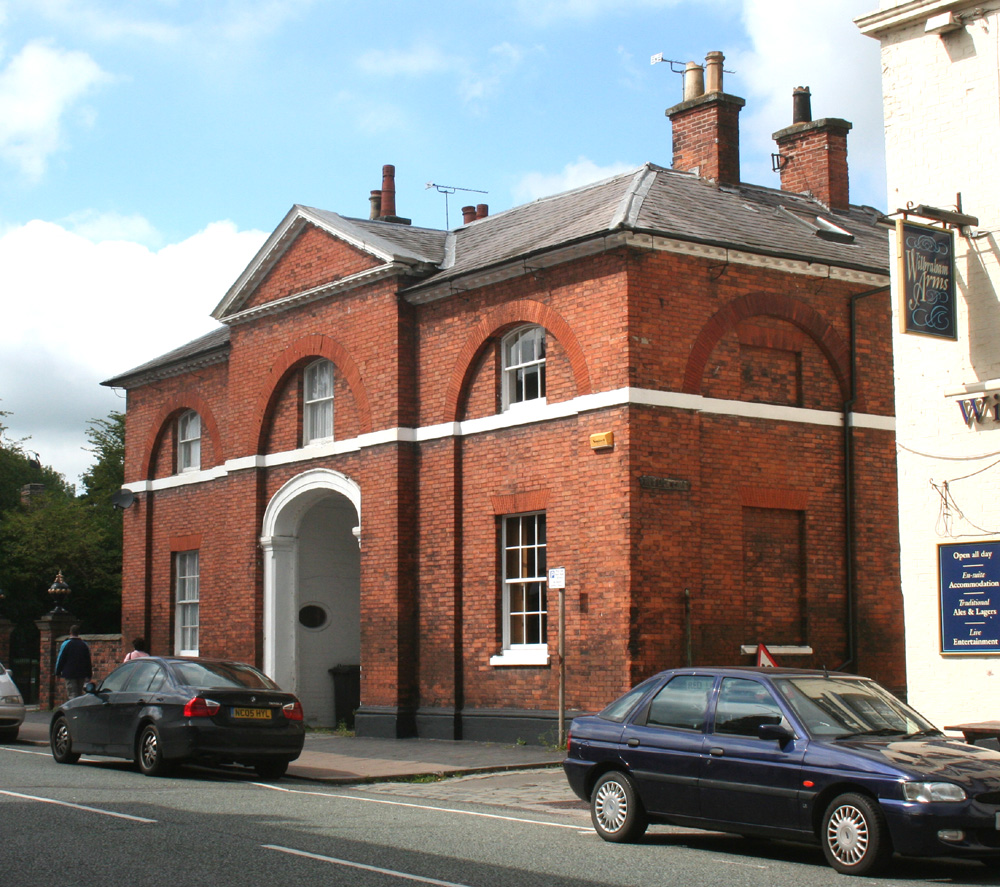
Another view, showing the Red Lion Lane face (right)

The Gateway was built in the early 19th century as the stable entrance to the Porch House, which stands behind it at number 64.

== Description ==
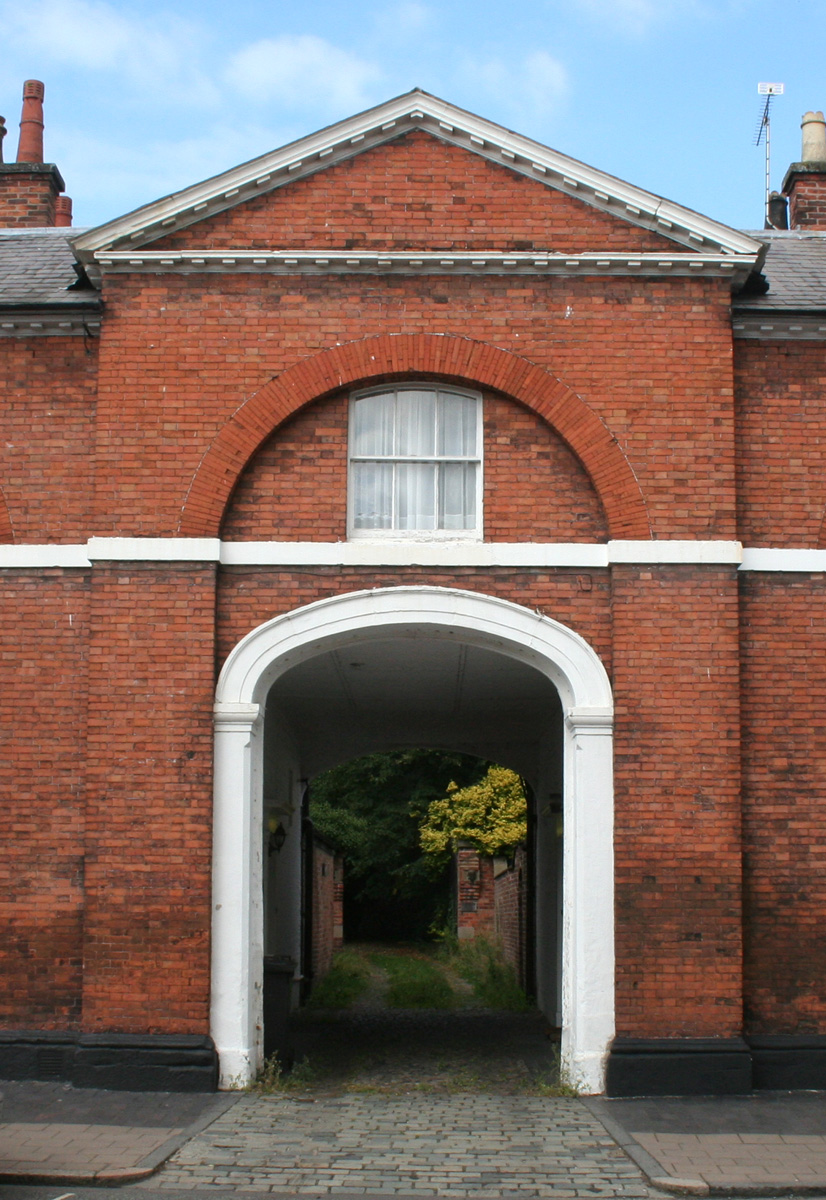
Central bay

The Gateway is a substantial detached Late Georgian building in red brick with a slate roof. Now divided into two dwellings, it has two storeys with three bays to the front. The Gateway stands immediately adjacent to the street while The Hawthorns, to its left, is set back behind a walled courtyard, so that the entire left face of The Gateway is visible from the street. A wide stone string course encircles the building immediately below the level of the first-floor windows, and there is a wooden cornice at eaves level.

The symmetrical front façade has a central slightly projecting section of a single bay width, which is capped with a pediment. There is a prominent central stone archway leading to the Porch House, which is framed by a large two-storey recess with an arched top outlined in brick. Above the archway, within the recess, is a small window with an arched top. The flanking wings on the front façade each have a similar recess containing a large sash window on the ground floor and a smaller one with an arched top on the first floor. This unit is twice repeated on each side of the building, with slight variations: on the side faces, the first-floor windows nearest the street have horizontal tops, and the windows to the Red Lion Lane face are blind. The main entrances to the two houses are within the archway.

== See also ==
- Listed buildings in Nantwich

== Sources ==
- Bavington G et al. Nantwich, Worleston & Wybunbury: A Portrait in Old Picture Postcards (Brampton Publications; 1987) (ISBN 0 9511469 6 3)
- Pevsner N, Hubbard E. The Buildings of England: Cheshire (Penguin Books; 1971) (ISBN 0 14 071042 6)
