= Hospital of St Lawrence, Acton =

Hospital of St Lawrence
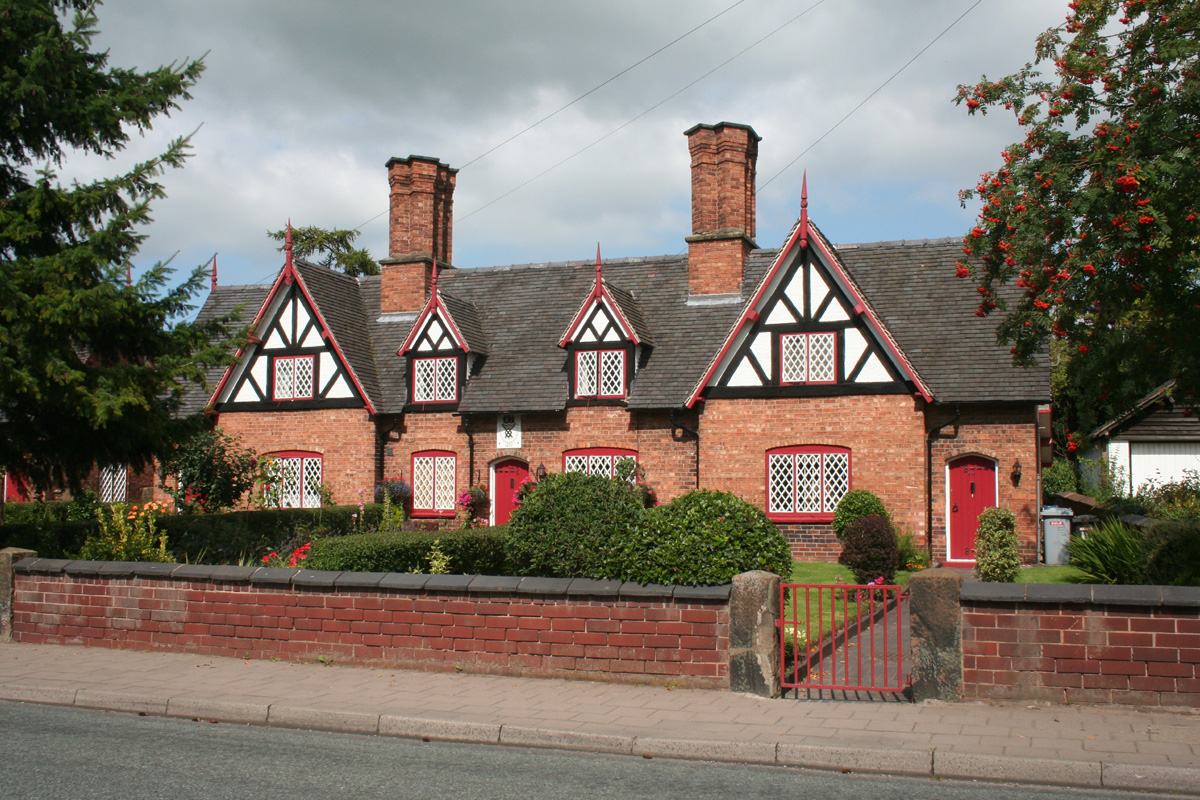
- The Tollemache Almshouses might occupy the site of the hospital

- Shown in Cheshire

Geography
- Location: Nantwich, England, United Kingdom
- Coordinates: 53.0683°N 2.5326°W

Organisation
- Care system: Private
- Type: Infirm poor

History
- Founded: 1083
- Closed: 1548

Links
- Lists: Hospitals in England

The Hospital of St Lawrence, variously known as St Lawrence's Hospital, the Hospice of St Lawrence and the free Chapel and Hospice of St Lawrence and St James, was a medieval house for lepers outside the town of Nantwich, Cheshire, England. It was located to the west of the town, on what is now Welsh Row, within the parish of Acton. St Lawrence's later became a hospital for the infirm poor. Dissolved in 1548, the hospital's land and property was purchased by the Wright family. One of its buildings was subsequently used for dwellings.

== History ==
Few records of the Hospital of St Lawrence remain, and its founder and date of foundation are unknown. It was originally a lazar house or house for lepers, who were not permitted to enter the town. The Hospital of St Lawrence was one of two medieval hospitals in or near Nantwich, the other being the Hospital of St Nicholas at the east of the town. Founded in 1083–84 at the end of Hospital Street to provide for the needs of travellers, it gave the modern street its name.

The Hospital of St Lawrence is known to have been situated around ½ mile west of the bridge over the River Weaver, well outside the medieval town of Nantwich and then within the adjacent parish of Acton. It stood on a road leading from the town bridge to Lawrence Well, now Welsh Row. Joseph Partridge, author of the first history of Nantwich published in 1774, associated the hospital with an area then occupied by a malthouse (now demolished) adjacent to the former Wilbraham's Almshouses, and it is traditionally considered to have been located on or near the site of the Tollemache Almshouses. However, little or no direct evidence survives as to its precise location. Partridge also states that a priory once existed close to the hospital; no other evidence for such a foundation now survives.

Medieval treatment for leprosy involved cleanliness and washing in healing springs, and St Lawrence's was presumably at or near the brine spring known as Lawrence Well. By the late 14th century, leprosy was in decline in Cheshire; in around 1348, at the time of an outbreak of Black Death in the county, St Lawrence's became a hospital for the infirm poor. The first record of the hospital is shortly afterwards in 1354–5, which states:

there ought to be one chaplain to sing divine service every day; and in which there ought to be three beds for the reception of poor sick people where they shall remain until they shall have recovered health; and that a certain service has been withheld for four years now elapsed; and it is now valued at 20 shillings per annum.

Local historian Eric Garton considers that the long interruption of services and apparent lack of an incumbent chaplain suggest that the previous chaplain had been a victim of the Black Death.

The 1354–5 document is interpreted by local historian James Hall as stating that Combermere Abbey claimed ownership of St Lawrence's, and Hall believes that a document of 1498–9 confirms this claimed ownership. Garton considers, however, that this claim is difficult to reconcile with the institution being described as a free Chapel, which would not have been under the jurisdiction of any parent church or abbey.

The 1498–9 document also contains the earliest recorded name of a chaplain, one John ffowler. The right to appoint the hospital's chaplain, or the advowson, had been acquired in part by the Lovell family some time before 1485; they had also owned the advowson of the Hospital of St Nicholas from around 1350. It is unknown who was originally responsible for appointing the chaplain. The advowson subsequently passed to the Crown.

In 1525, the chaplain was a Doctor Incent. At this date, the hospital's income was described:

The said Chapel is worth £4 per ann. from lands and tenements belonging to the same. And there is paid to the Barons of Wich Malbank for toll of salt 4 shillings. So that there remains clear, 76 shillings. Also the tithes amount to 7s. 7¼d.

In 1536, just over a decade before its dissolution, the hospital's income was still estimated at £4.

== Dissolution ==
At the dissolution of the Chantries in 1548, the hospital and its chapel closed and became the property of the Crown. At this date, the institution was valued at 76 shillings a year, and was recorded as having bells to the value of 2 shillings, but no plate, jewels, goods, ornaments or lead. The last chaplain was Richard Wright, who was awarded a pension of £3 8s 4d, which he continued to receive until at least 1562; he died in 1585. The Wright family was prominent in Nantwich from the mid-16th century. Wright's will shows him to have been a relatively wealthy man, who is known to have also been the owner of Nantwich's Bell Inn. He was the great-uncle of Sir Edmund Wright, Lord Mayor of London, who founded Wright's Almshouses in the town.

The building, lands and possessions of the former hospital were purchased from the Crown on 7 September 1548 by William Warde of London and Richard Venables, sergeant at arms, together with the site of the former Chapel of St James of Newall, also in the parish of Acton, and other properties in Nantwich, for a total of just over £1111. Richard Wright was then the tenant. The building, lands and tithes of St Lawrence's appear to have later been purchased by Wright. According to the 1589 post mortem inquisition of his son, also Richard Wright, the hospital's lands included "another pasture called Chapel-croft, and half of another pasture called the Chapel-field adjacent, lying in Acton". The tithes were transferred by the younger Wright's daughters and heirs, Margaret Woodnoth and Elizabeth Davenport, to the minister of St Mary's Church in Nantwich on 1 May 1639. One of the buildings of the hospital is mentioned in a document of 1653: "a messuage called the Hospitall now divided into three dwellings in/near the Welsh Row in Wich Malbanke".
