= Crewe Almshouses =

Crewe Almshouses or Crewe's Almshouses may refer to several almshouses founded by members of the Crewe family, including:

- Crewe Almshouses, Nantwich, Cheshire: founded by John Crewe, 1st Baron Crewe
- Almshouses in Brackley, Northamptonshire: founded by Sir Thomas Crewe of Stene
