= Wright's Almshouses, Nantwich =

Grade II* listed building in Nantwich, Cheshire, England

Coordinates: 53.0688°N 2.5170°W

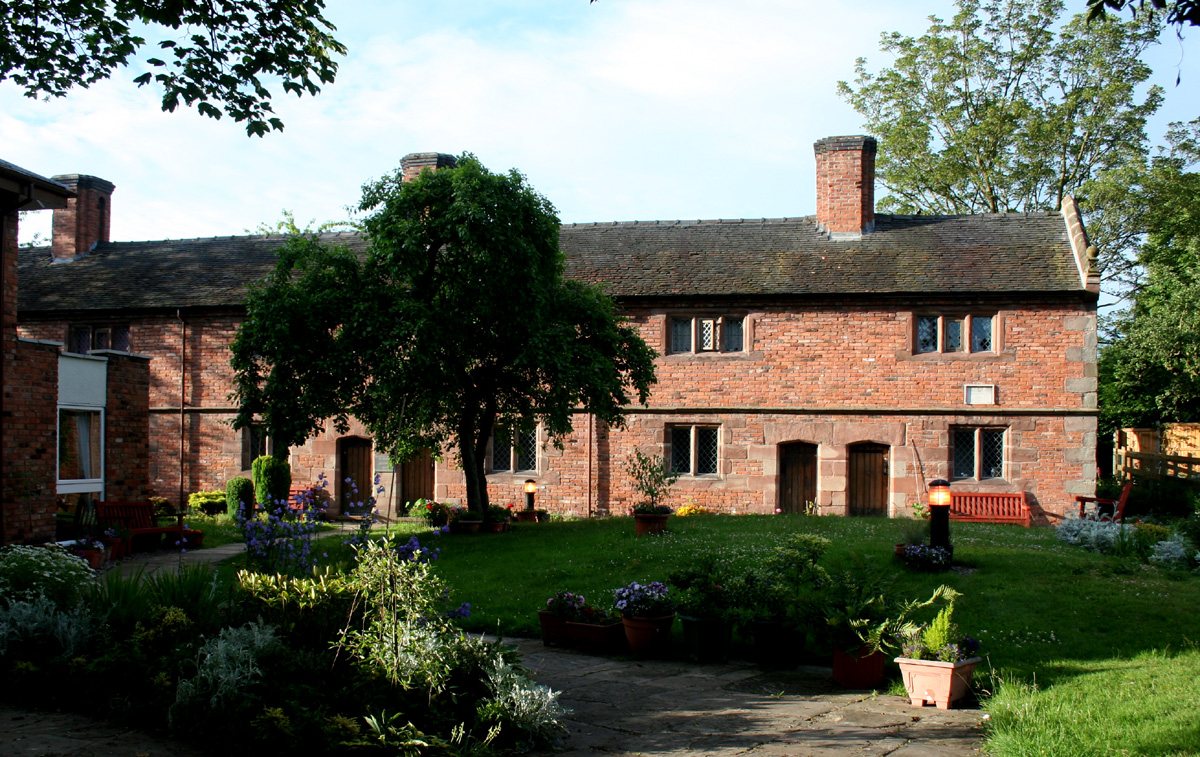
Wright's Almshouses, Beam Street, Nantwich

Wright's Almshouses is a terrace of six former almshouses now located on Beam Street (SJ654525) in Nantwich, Cheshire, England. The building was originally erected at the junction of Hospital Street and London Road in 1638 by Edmund Wright (later Sir Edmund Wright), Lord Mayor of London in 1640–41, and is listed at grade II*. The low red-brick terrace has stone dressings and a central stone panel with arms. The adjacent stone archway of 1667, which Nikolaus Pevsner describes as the "best" feature of the almshouses, is also listed separately at grade II*, together with its associated wall.

By the 1960s, the Wright's Almshouses were in a poor condition, and the building was threatened with demolition. The almshouses were saved by a plan which involved moving the building, together with its wall and gateway, from London Road to stand adjacent to the Crewe Almshouses at the end of Beam Street, and constructing modern facilities shared by both former almshouses. The new complex was completed in 1975, and Wright's Almshouses remain in use as sheltered housing for the elderly.

== History ==
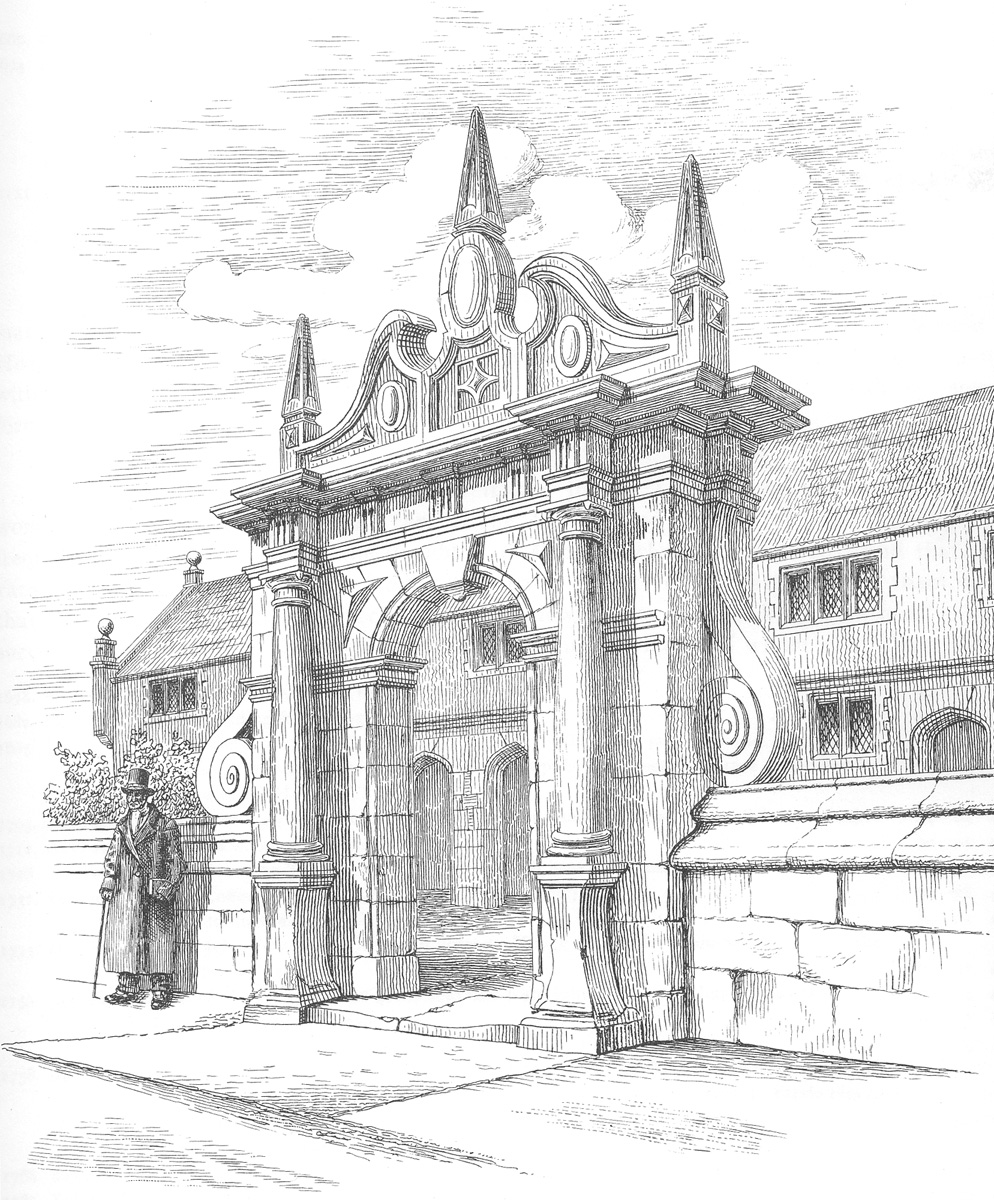
Victorian engraving of the gateway, with almsman William Bramhall in the traditional dress

The Wright's Almshouses were built in 1638 by Edmund Wright, later Sir Edmund Wright, and were the town's second almshouses (after those on Welsh Row founded in 1613 by Sir Roger Wilbraham). Born in Nantwich, Wright became a successful London merchant, serving as an alderman and then as Lord Mayor of London in 1640–41. The deed of 20 August 1638 establishing the almshouses stated that they were founded "out of his pious intention and charitable disposition towards the poor inhabitants of Wich Malbank". They were originally located at the far end of Hospital Street and the start of London Road on land that had once been associated with the Hospice of St Nicholas. Wright also donated the land behind the building, and £32 annually in rent from the Ryefields farm in Hillingdon, Middlesex.

The almshouses were "for the use and benefit of six poor men". Recipients were required to be single men of at least 50 years, unable to make a living by labour, who had been born in Nantwich and had also been resident in the town for at least the previous three years; they were further required to be members of the Church of England and "of good honest behaviour and conversation". Men with the surname of Wright were preferred for the positions. In addition to accommodation, each man was given a quarterly pension of 20 shillings, and also received a shirt and a pair of shoes and stockings every Christmas, and a gown (and later also a hat) every two years (every three years from 1771). Numerous rules governed the behaviour of the charity recipients, and fines, suspension or even expulsion for infractions are all recorded. Twice-daily prayers and (for the able bodied), regular attendance at church services were required, while the rules prohibited marriage, "swearing, Drunkenness, and all such scandalous Vices" and keeping "any Woman as an Harlot". An annual inspection took place on 24 November, the anniversary of Wright's baptism, followed by a feast. By 1883, 197 men had been almsmen, of whom fifteen were named Wright. Several instances of married almsmen are recorded, but this was prohibited in 1717–18.

The almshouses were administered by a group of thirteen trustees appointed by Wright; the original trustees included several members of the Wright family, representatives of other prominent Nantwich families including the Maistersons, Wilbrahams and Churches, and the minister of St Mary's Church. Whenever eight of the thirteen trustees had died, the surviving trustees were to elect another eight men to replace them. As with the almsmen, men related to Wright or bearing that surname were to be preferred. Later trustees included local architect, Thomas Bower. In 1666–68, a stone gateway and an inscribed tablet with a coat of arms were added by the trustees at a total cost of just over £4, paid for by keeping some of the houses vacant.

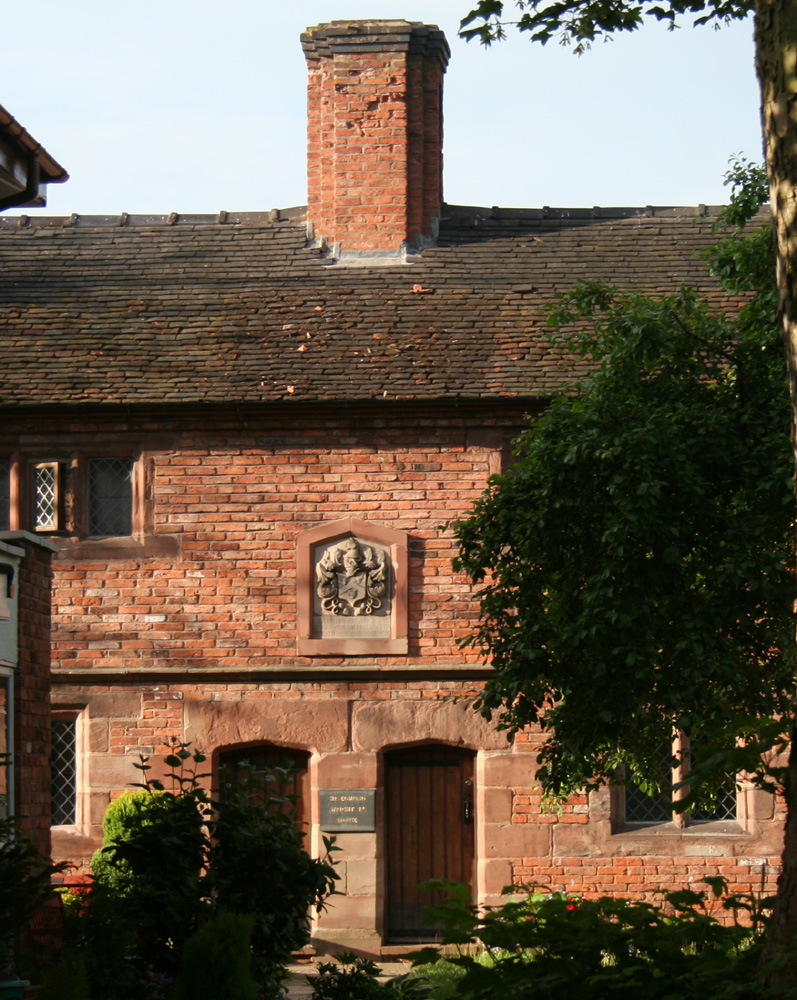
Detail of terrace showing stone panel

In 1800, a female caretaker was appointed who lived in one of the houses and looked after the almsmen. As the charity's endowment was fixed at £32, the pension did not increase from the original 20 shillings quarterly, except in being supplemented with a weekly sixpenny loaf from 1795. By the early 19th century, it proved entirely inadequate; some pensioners left the almshouses for the workhouse, while others "died in great poverty and neglect". A gift from William Sprout in 1829 increased the pension to £10 annually, improving the standard of living from the original foundation.

Maintenance suffered during the Second World War and, by the early 1960s, the Wright's Almshouses had become dilapidated. The site was then surrounded by the premises of a garage. In 1969, the charity trustees proposed to demolish the building and sell the land. In 1970, a novel plan was proposed which involved moving the Wright's Almshouses to stand at the end of Beam Street adjacent to the Crewe Almshouses, which were then also in a very poor condition, and constructing communal facilities in a modern shared block. This was eventually agreed and, in 1973, the Wright's Almshouses charity merged with the charities administering the Crewe Almshouses and the Delves and Meakin Almshouses on Love Lane, as well as the Harriet Hope Charity, to form the "Almshouse Charities of Sir Edmund Wright, Crewe and Others". An area of 1032 square yards of derelict gardens to the rear of the Crewe Almshouses was purchased, and in 1973–75, the Wright's Almshouses building was dismantled and reconstructed on this plot, using new and recovered building materials. The cost of moving the building and its gateway was estimated at £16,700. A further estimated £6,300 was spent on building single-storey extensions at the rear of the terrace. The complex was formally opened on 1 December 1975 by Princess Alexandra. The town's conservation area was extended to include the entire site.

== Description ==
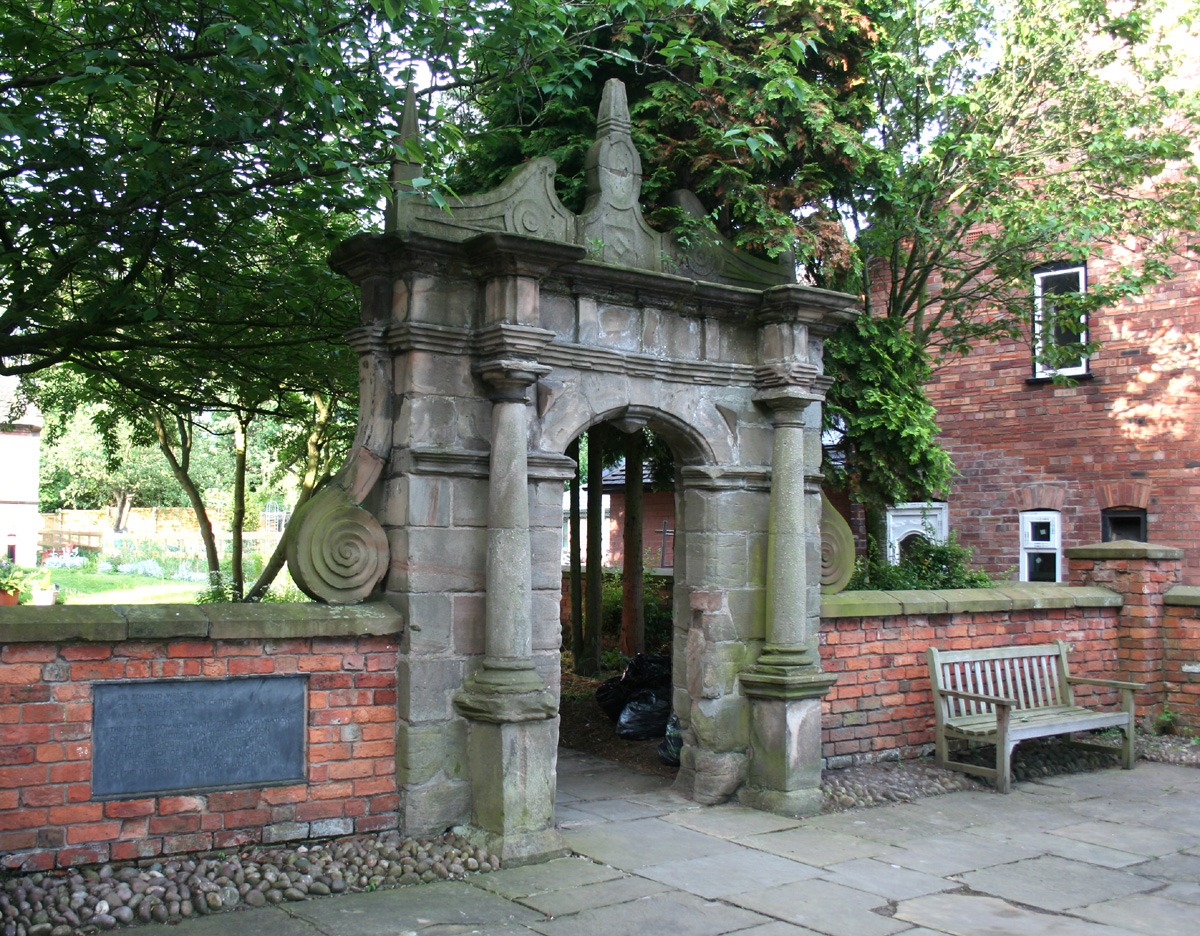
Stone archway and commemorative tablet (left)

Wright's Almshouses is a terrace of six cottages with two low storeys, in red brick with sandstone dressings under a tiled roof. The ends of the terrace have stone long and short quoins, as do the surrounds to the doors and windows. There is also a prominent stone coping to the gable ends, which is finished with a ball decoration. All the windows have stone mullions. There is a stone string course between ground and first floors. The roof has three large brick chimney stacks.

The terrace bears a central stone panel with the arms of the Bulkeley family, including three bulls' heads; local historian James Hall notes that the Wright family did not have the right to bear these arms. The inscription, now partly illegible, is recorded by Hall as "S^{r.} Edmund Wright Kt. borne in this towne sole founder of this almeshouse a'no dom. 1638."

The use of brick other than for chimneys was very unusual in Nantwich at this date. Other brick buildings include Townsend House, the Wilbraham mansion on Welsh Row completed in around 1580, and the Wright's house on Mill Street, dating from the early 17th century (both of which have now been demolished). Local historian Jeremy Lake considers that the use of brick was an expression of wealth of the patron.

=== Gateway ===
The arched stone gateway is flanked by Tuscan columns resting on pedestals, and has prominent side scrolls, one of which has been restored. The entablature above the arch is topped with coping in Jacobean style. English Heritage describes the structure as "a fine gateway", while Pevsner calls it the "best" feature of the almshouses. It was originally painted and gilded. The archway is surrounded by a low red-brick wall with a stone coping. A modern commemorative tablet in the wall to the left of the archway records the amalgamation of the almshouse charities; it was dedicated on 24 November 1973.

== Modern usage ==
The Wright's Almshouses remain in use as sheltered housing for the elderly. They are now administered by a joint body of trustees for all the surviving Nantwich almshouses, together with the adjacent Crewe and Harriet Hope Almshouses.

== See also ==
- Listed buildings in Nantwich
- List of almshouses in the United Kingdom
