= Arthur Corye =

Irish barrister

Arthur Corye (or Curry; died 1597) was an Irish barrister who held office as Serjeant-at-law (Ireland) from 1594 until his death, and had a bad reputation for incompetence.

In 1591 he was described as a "man learned in the law". Initially, he seems to have been regarded with some favour as a law officer: the patent appointing him Serjeant, dated 1 May 1594, was issued free, without payment of the usual fees, since "he is one of the Queen's officers, and must take pains for her Majesty".

Our second personal glimpse of him is contained in a letter from the Privy Council of Ireland to Sir Robert Cecil after his death: the letter makes it abundantly clear that he had not, as required, "taken pains" in the Queen's service. The Council complained that Corye had been so incompetent in prosecuting cases on behalf of the English Crown, especially in revenue and exchequer matters, that the Irish Treasury had suffered serious financial loss due to his neglect of duty.

As so often under the Tudor dynasty, the Council's remedy was the appointment of an English lawyer to replace him. The letter notes that the Solicitor-General for Ireland, Roger Wilbraham, who was English by birth, was the only law officer who did his work competently. He was praised as one who "hath taken more care and pains than all the rest", and therefore the obvious choice for Serjeant-at-law. While the Crown often complied with such requests, Corye was replaced instead by another Irish lawyer, Edward Loftus, a noted legal scholar from a leading Dublin family. Wilbraham in any case was "marking time" in Ireland while waiting for a more lucrative appointment in England.

== Sources ==
- Fiants of Elizabeth 1
- Hart, A. R. History of the King's Serjeants at law in Ireland Four Courts Dublin 2000
- Smyth, Constantine Joseph Chronicle of the Law Officers of Ireland Butterworths London 1838
