= Widows' Almshouses, Nantwich =

Grade II listed building in Nantwich, Cheshire, England

Coordinates: 53.0678°N 2.5258°W

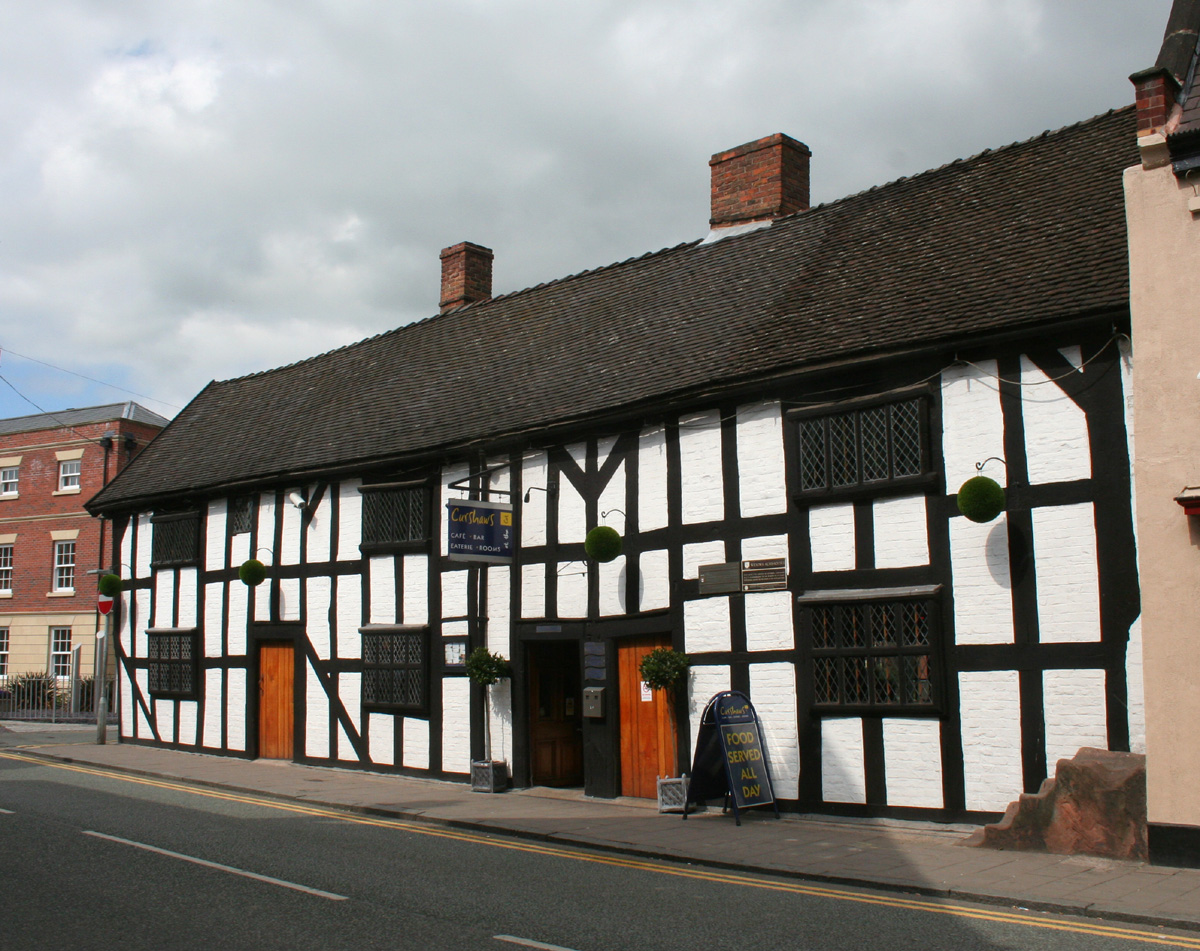
- Widows' Almshouses, 26–30 Welsh Row, Nantwich; the mounting block is on the right
- Interactive map of the Widows' Almshouses, Nantwich area

General information
- Location: Nantwich, Cheshire, England
- Completed: 1676

Technical details
- Material: Timber

The Widows' Almshouses, also known as the Wilbraham or Wilbraham's Almshouses and as the Widows' Hospital, are former almshouses for six widows in Nantwich, Cheshire, England. They are located at numbers 26–30 on the north side of Welsh Row, on the junction with Second Wood Street (at SJ6486452420). The almshouses were founded by Roger Wilbraham in 1676–7 in memory of his deceased wife in three existing cottages built in 1637; they were the earliest almshouses in the town for women. In 1705, Wilbraham also founded the Old Maids' Almshouse for two old maids in a separate building (now demolished) on Welsh Row. They remained in use as almshouses until the 1930s. The timber-framed Widows' Almshouses building, which is listed at grade II, has subsequently been used as a café, public house, night club, restaurant, wine bar and hotel.

Nikolaus Pevsner considers Welsh Row "the best street of Nantwich". The street has many listed buildings and is known for its mixture of architectural styles, including other black-and-white cottages, Georgian town houses such as Townwell House and number 83, and Victorian buildings such as the former Grammar School, Primitive Methodist Chapel and Savings Bank. Two other former almshouses remain on Welsh Row: the Wilbraham's Almshouses were founded in 1613 by Wilbraham's ancestor Sir Roger Wilbraham, and the Tollemache Almshouses were built in 1870 to replace these by John Tollemache, a descendant of Sir Roger Wilbraham.

== History ==
Roger Wilbraham (1623–1707/8) was born at Townsend House on Welsh Row, and inherited the family's Nantwich property on the death of his elder brother in 1649. He was the great-nephew of his namesake Sir Roger Wilbraham, founder of the Wilbraham's Almshouses. He married in 1656; his wife Alice was the daughter of another Roger Wilbraham from the Dorfold branch of the family.

In 1675–76, Wilbraham experienced personal tragedy: his two eldest sons died within a few months of each other in 1675, and his wife died on 8 September 1676, the anniversary of the death of his eldest son. A few months after the death of his wife, he decided to found almhouses for impoverished widows in her memory, describing their foundation in detail in his journal:

It was just Quarter of a year before I returned to my widow-bed, & that while I had no rest in my spirit; sleep became a straunger to me; and while I lay musing I thought of erecting a monument that might transmit the memory of my D.[ear] wife to posterity; it came into my thoughts, that I had in our own Street, three well built houses, under a roof, with convenient apartments, that might easily be converted into an Almshouse, for half a dozen poor aged widows; and thought better to devote something of this nature to the Honor of God and to her memory that had been mindfull to lay something by, to be distributed to poor widows in her own street. I gave notice forthwith to the Tenants of these houses to remove at Christmas coming and till then I c^{d} proceed no further in this affair. [...] I made all possible haste to fitt the houses w^{ch} were now in my possession for the reception of six aged widows, that I had there in my thoughts. I endowed the same by deed executed by Livery, with lands to the value of xxiiij^{li} per ann.; for a constant and perpetual maintenance for so many poor aged widows for ages to come. Which done the six widows took their lodging in the said almshouse; two in each house (for society) upon the eve of the Blessed Virgin M[ary] 1676. The day following being Sunday the said widows went orderly in their gowns to Church; took their places in a seat w^{ch} I had provided for them in the face of the Pulpit; dined with me that day; and joined with me and my family to beg a blessing upon this charitable mite which God enabled me and inclined my heart to cast into the Corban, and lent me life to see it accomplished.

The three existing cottages that Wilbraham converted for this purpose had been built by his father, Thomas Wilbraham, in 1637. The almshouse deed was dated 15 January 1676–7; the endowment of lands in Betchton, near Sandbach, gave an annual income of £24. Each house was occupied by two widows, and had two rooms on the ground floor with a single room above. It is traditionally stated that a line was drawn across the main ground-floor room in each cottage, passing through the centre of the single grate, leading to arguments about housework. In 1705, a few years before his death, Wilbraham additionally founded an almshouse for two "old Maids", with an annual endowment of £3 per head. The Old Maids' Almshouse was a small cottage with a single room on each floor located near the Widows' Almshouses, on the other side of Welsh Row.

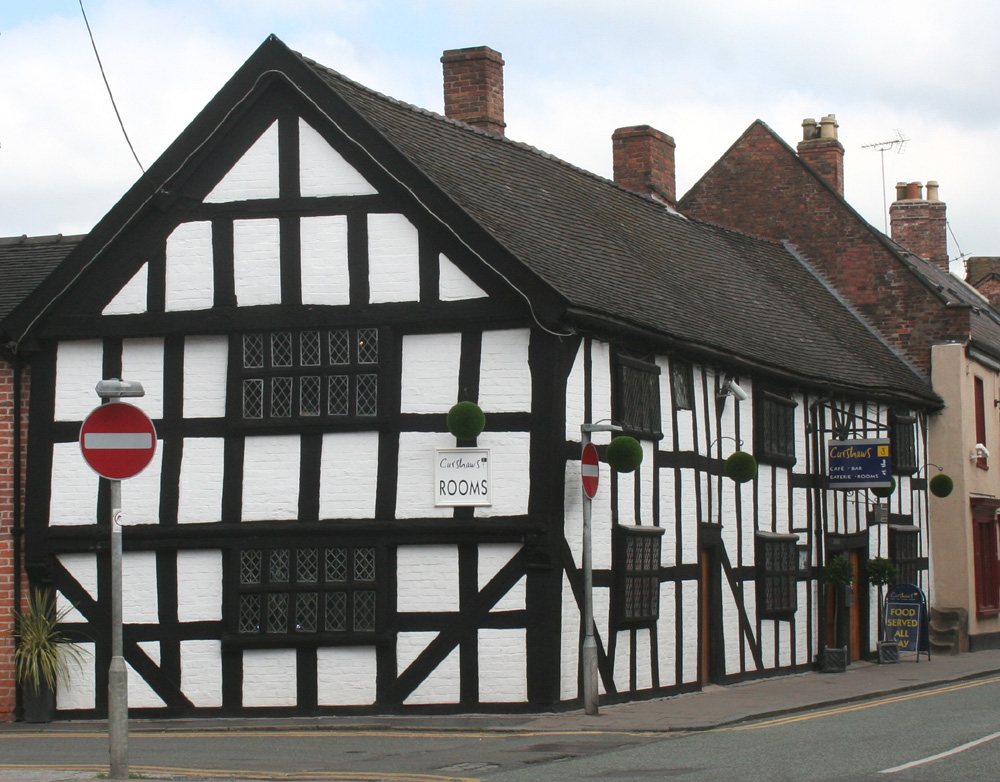
Gable end to Second Wood Street

In 1721, the endowments of both the Widows' and Old Maids' Almshouses were increased by Randle Wilbraham, Roger Wilbraham's eldest surviving son. They were increased again in 1834 from a bequest of £500 by Peter Sprout; he and his brother William were among the town's major 19th-century benefactors. In 1850, the inhabitants of the Widows' and Old Maids' Almshouses each received, respectively, 17s 6d or 15 shillings quarterly, plus 6s 8d or 3s 4d annually for coal, and a gown and petticoat every other year; all received an additional £2 1s 0d a year from the Sprout bequest. Additional cottages were added at the rear of the Widows' Almshouses on Second Wood Street in the 19th century. The Old Maids' Almshouse had only a single occupant throughout much of the 19th century. The almshouses were still being maintained by the Wilbraham family in the 1930s.

By around 1935, the Widows' Almshouses had fallen vacant and their buildings had become dilapidated. After the Second World War, the buildings were renovated and converted into the Cheshire Cat Eating House, one of the town's best-known cafés and tea shops. The interior contained a display of antiques, including man traps and bear traps. They have subsequently been used as a public house and, from 1972, a night club. In the early 21st century, after standing empty and semi-derelict for four years, the building was renovated and opened as a restaurant, wine bar and hotel, known as Curshaw's at the Cat and most recently the Cheshire Cat. At some time after 1907, the brick cottages on Second Wood Street were painted black and white to resemble the half-timbered building; the paint was removed in the 21st-century renovation.

The Old Maids' Almshouse still retained a single almswoman in 1939. It was sold to the local council in 1940, and demolished in the mid-1950s to make way for the access street to the Queen's Drive housing estate.

== Description ==
The former Widows' Almshouses are an L-shaped building on the corner of Welsh Row and Second Wood Street. The 17th-century part of the building faces Welsh Row and comprises a terrace of three black-and-white cottages with a timber frame infilled with bricks under a tiled roof. It has six bays and two storeys, with a gabled end to Second Wood Street. A two-storey 19th-century extension in brick faces Second Wood Street.

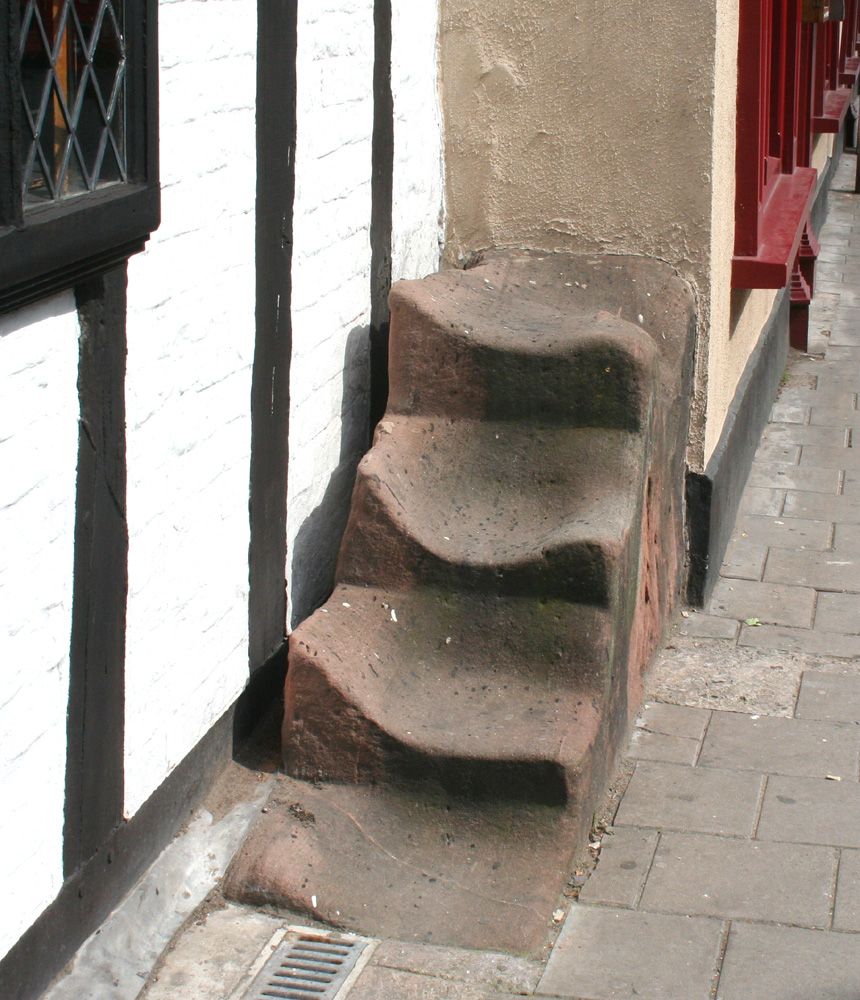
Mounting block

The timber frame has large tension braces (diagonal timbers) which are straight rather than curved as in similar buildings of an earlier date, such as the Chantry House in Bunbury. The timber work is of high quality and features ovolo moulding. The gable to Second Wood Street has a dentillated beam between ground and first floors. There are three doorways with square-headed wooden surrounds to the Welsh Row face. This face has three mullioned and transomed four-light windows to the ground floor; those to the gable have five lights. The windows retain the original wooden cases featuring ovolo and cyma mouldings.

In the original layout, the doorways opened onto a small lobby area in front of the chimney breast, a characteristic feature of Nantwich buildings dating from the early 17th century. The staircase was located on the far side of the chimney breast and a wattle-and-daub partition protected the fire from draughts. The interior has been sensitively restored, and retains the exposed timbers throughout.

A grade-II-listed mounting block dating from the 17th or 18th century stands outside the Welsh Row face. It has four steps cut from a single stone block, which are much eroded. The wear has been attributed to the adjacent butcher's shop (now incorporated into the Nakatcha Bar, formerly the Three Pigeons public house) belonging to Harry Bebbington, who is said to have sharpened his knives on the steps.

== Modern usage ==
As of 2010, the building is known as the Cheshire Cat, a restaurant, bar and hotel with 11 rooms.

== See also ==
- Listed buildings in Nantwich
- List of almshouses in the United Kingdom
