= Wilbraham's Almshouses, Nantwich =

Historic almshouses in Nantwich

Coordinates: 53.0680°N 2.5321°W

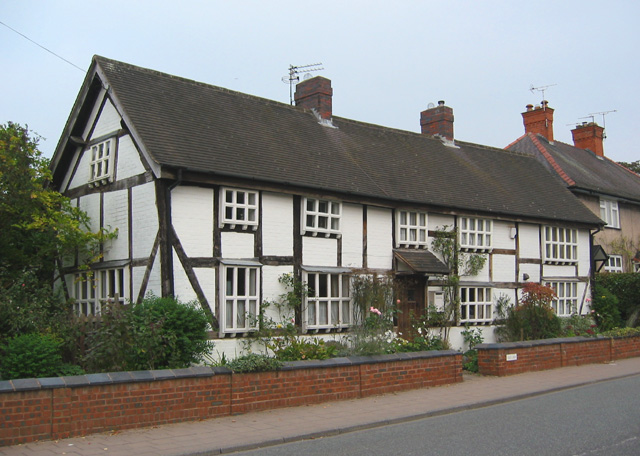
Wilbraham's Almshouses, 112–116 Welsh Row, Nantwich

The Wilbraham's Almshouses, also known as the Wilbraham Almshouses, are six former almshouses in Nantwich, Cheshire, England, located on the north side of Welsh Row at numbers 112–116 (at SJ6444252448). Founded by Sir Roger Wilbraham in 1613, they were the town's earliest almshouses. They remained in use as almshouses until 1870, when they were replaced by the adjacent Tollemache Almshouses. The timber-framed building, which is listed at grade II, was subsequently used as a malthouse and as cottages, and was later considerably altered to form a single house. The Hospital of St Lawrence, a medieval house for lepers, might have been situated nearby.

Nikolaus Pevsner considers Welsh Row "the best street of Nantwich". The street has many listed buildings and is known for its mixture of architectural styles, including other black-and-white cottages such as the Widows' Almshouses founded by Sir Roger's descendant, Georgian town houses such as Townwell House and number 83, and Victorian buildings such as the former Grammar School, Primitive Methodist Chapel and Savings Bank.

== History ==
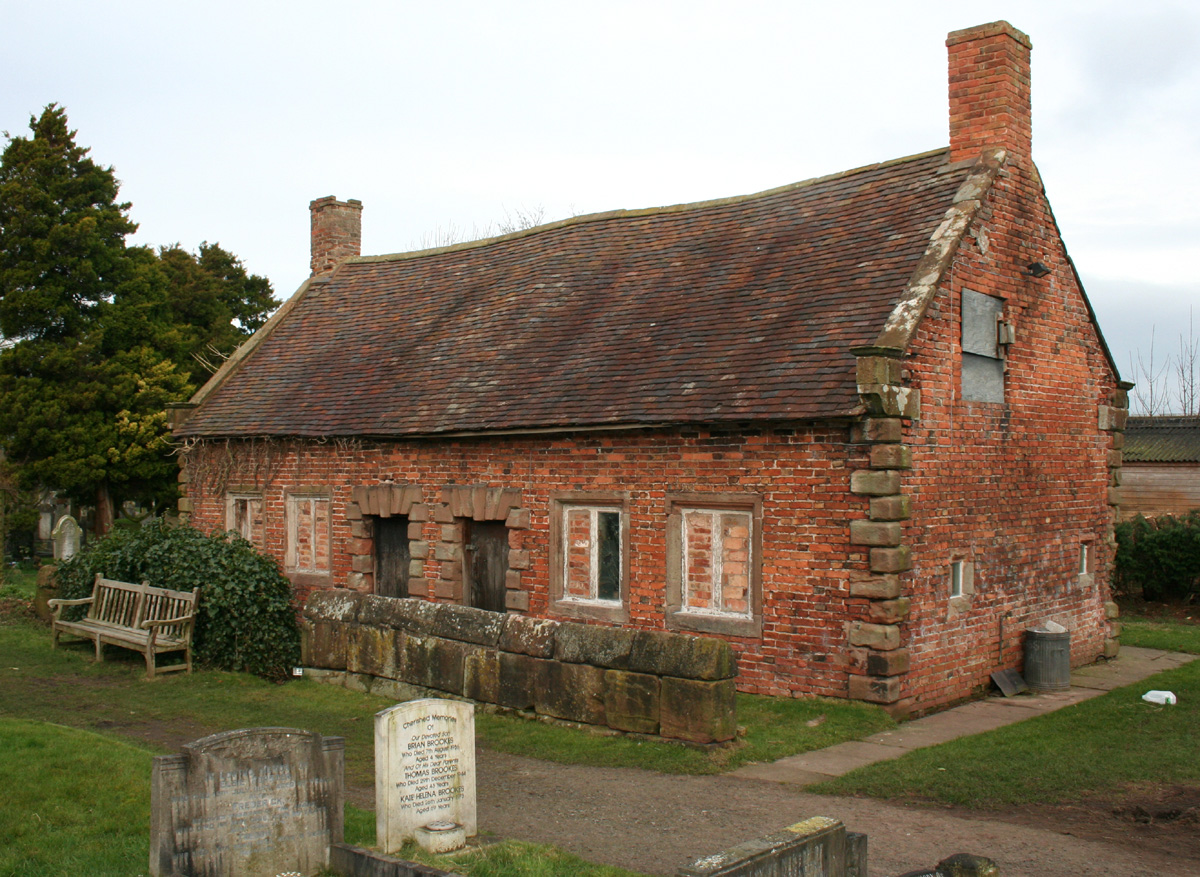
Almshouses in Acton, also founded by Sir Roger Wilbraham in 1613

Sir Roger Wilbraham (1553–1616) was a prominent lawyer who served as Solicitor-General for Ireland under Elizabeth I and held several positions at court under James I. Born in Nantwich, he purchased the Dorfold estate in the adjacent parish of Acton in 1602.

In 1613, Sir Roger founded almshouses for six poor men at what was then the end of Welsh Row; they were the town's earliest almshouses. The Hospital of St Lawrence, a medieval house for lepers, is believed to have been situated near the almshouse site. Four of the six almsmen were to be chosen from Nantwich, and two from the parish of Acton. Each almsman originally received four marks (£2 13s 4d) annually (according to William Webb, five marks, or £3 6s 8d), as well as a gown every two years. The same year, he also founded a pair of almshouses in the village of Acton. The original Nantwich almshouse was:

a low brick building of one story, the only ornament, in the centre, being a stone tablet of the Arms of Wilbraham, of Dorfold, and the date 1613. It stood close to the road, and had a garden behind divided into six plots.

It might have been more similar to the existing appearance of the Acton almshouses than to the much-altered building surviving on Welsh Row. Webb described each almshouse in 1622 as "an handsome lodging" with "a little garden". The original wall by the street had a stone gateway; this is thought to have been moved to the garden of Townsend House (now demolished), the Welsh Row mansion of the Wilbraham family, and later to the grounds of Dorfold Hall.

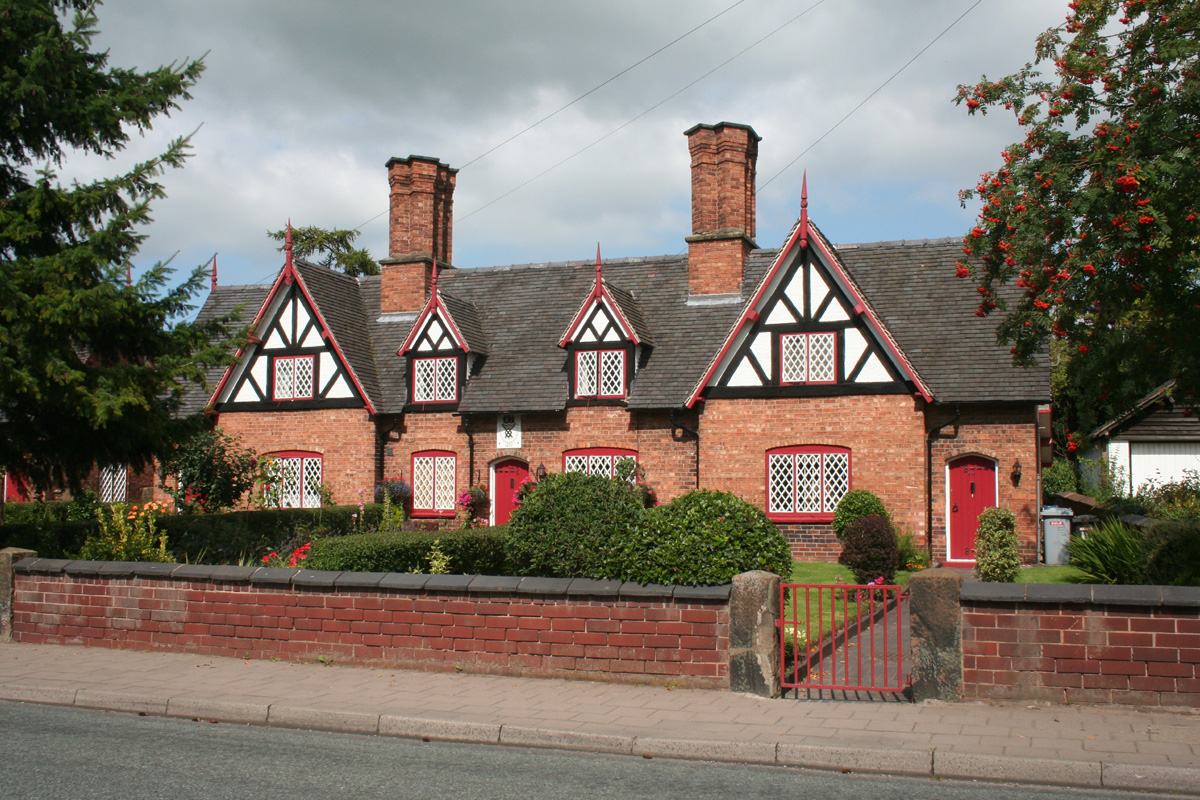
Tollemache Almshouses replaced Wilbraham's Almshouses in 1870

Before 1661–62, the Nantwich almshouses' endowment was increased by £12 a year by Lady Grace Wilbraham of Woodhey. Wilbraham's Almshouses were maintained by the Wilbraham family until 1692, when responsibility for them passed into the Tollemache family because of the earlier marriage of Grace Wilbraham, the Wilbraham heiress, to Lionel Tollemache, the third Earl of Dysart. By 1774, the almsmen received 40 shillings and a pair of shoes annually, and a grey gown faced with blue and cap every two years. In 1856, the almshouses' endowment was considerably increased by a bequest of £738 13s 7d from Elizabeth and Mary Bennion, sisters of the wife of St Mary's minister.

In 1870, the Wilbraham's Almshouses were replaced by the adjacent Tollemache Almshouses, built by John Tollemache, a descendant of Sir Roger Wilbraham, on the gardens of the Wilbraham's Almshouses. The almshouse building was subsequently used as a malthouse, and in the early 20th century was known as The Maltkilns. The original thatched roof was still present in 1907, when the building was divided into four two-storey cottages. By around 1930, the thatch had been replaced by corrugated iron, and the building was derelict in around 1971. The former almshouses have subsequently undergone substantial alterations to form a single house.

== Description ==
112–116 Welsh Row is a timber-framed, black-and-white cottage, set back from the street behind a low wall. It has two low storeys with modern brick infilling under a tiled roof. The existing single house incorporates part of the 16th-century timber frame. Pevsner writes that "[t]he façade seems to heave visibly." The ground floor has modern five mullioned and transomed windows, and a central doorway with a tiled hood above.

== Modern usage ==
The almshouses are now a single private residence, Malthouse Cottage.

== See also ==
- Listed buildings in Nantwich
- List of almshouses in the United Kingdom

== Sources ==
- Bavington G et al. Nantwich, Worleston & Wybunbury: A Portrait in Old Picture Postcards (Brampton Publications; 1987) (ISBN 0 9511469 6 3)
- Blacklay F. Almshouses of Nantwich (A4 Media Services; 1995)
- Hall J. A History of the Town and Parish of Nantwich, or Wich Malbank, in the County Palatine of Chester (2nd edn) (E. J. Morten; 1972) (ISBN 0-901598-24-0)
- Latham FA, ed. Acton (The Local History Group; 1995) (ISBN 0 9522284 1 6)
- Lamberton A, Gray R. Lost Houses in Nantwich (Landmark Publishing; 2005) (ISBN 1 84306 202 X)
- Pevsner N, Hubbard E. The Buildings of England: Cheshire (Penguin Books; 1971) (ISBN 0 14 071042 6)
- Simpson R. Crewe and Nantwich: A Pictorial History (Phillimore; 1991) (ISBN 0 85033 724 0)
- Vaughan D. Nantwich: It Was Like This (Nantwich Museum; 1987)
