= Crewe Almshouses, Nantwich =

Coordinates: 53.0692°N 2.5166°W

Crewe Almshouses
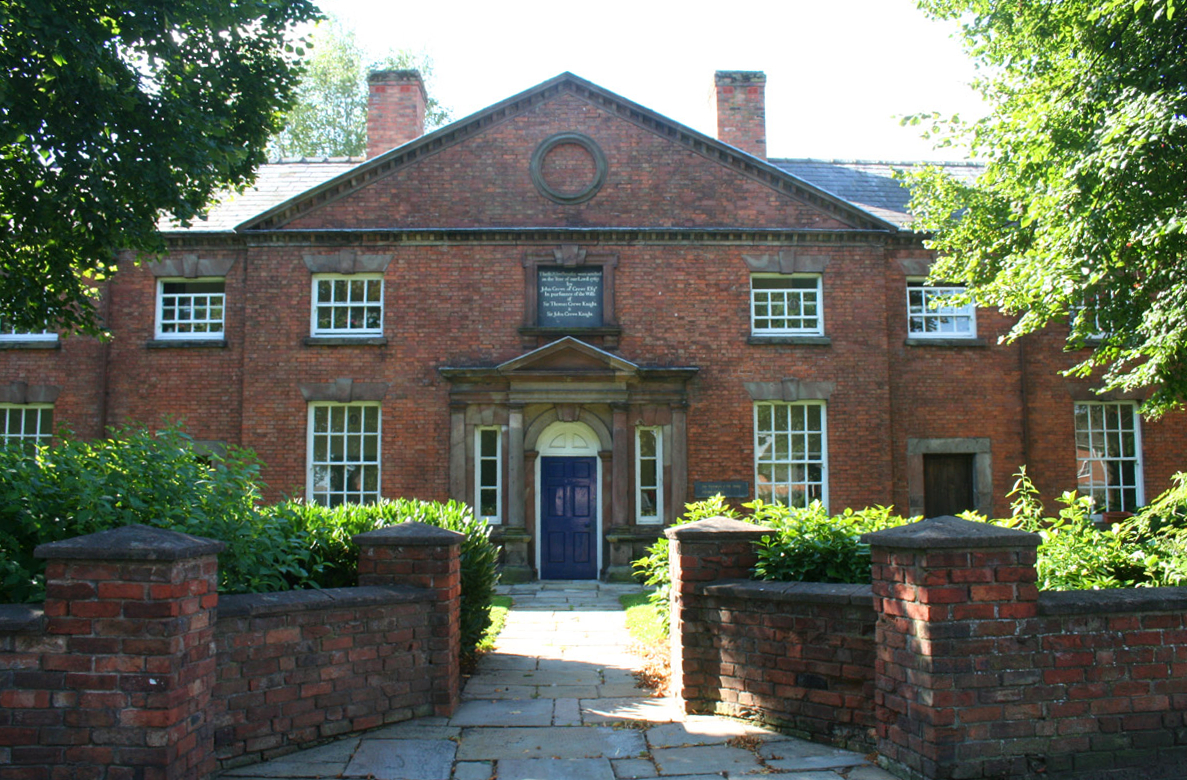
- Crewe Almshouses, Beam Street, Nantwich
- Interactive map of the Crewe Almshouses area
- Former names: Crewe's Almshouses
- Etymology: John Crewe

General information
- Status: Grade II listed
- Type: Terrace of seven former almshouses
- Location: Nantwich, Beam Street, UK
- Current tenants: Sheltered flats for the elderly
- Opened: 1767

Crewe Almshouses or Crewe's Almshouses is a terrace of seven former almshouses at the end of Beam Street (SJ6548152562) in Nantwich, Cheshire, England. The present building was erected in 1767 by John Crewe, later first Baron Crewe, and is listed at grade II. It has a central projecting section topped by a pediment, with a stone doorway flanked with Tuscan columns. The present almshouses stand on the site of a 16th-century building, originally the mansion of the Mainwaring family and later the town's House of Correction and workhouse.

By the 1960s, the Crewe Almshouses were in a poor condition, and the building was threatened with demolition. It was saved by a plan which involved moving the Wright's Almshouses from London Road to stand adjacent to the Crewe Almshouses, converting the Crewe Almshouses into flats for the elderly, and constructing modern facilities shared by both former almshouses. The new complex was completed in 1975, and Crewe Almshouses remain in use as sheltered flats for the elderly.

== History ==
The site has been identified by local historian James Hall as the location of the mansion of the Mainwaring family at the end of Beam Street, which was described by William Webb in 1622 or 1623 as "the fine house of the Mainwarings", one of the five principal houses of the town. The Mainwaring family had settled in Nantwich in the late 15th century, and by the late 16th century were among the wealthiest families of the town. The house was described in Roger Mainwaring's will of 1590 as "my chief mansion house at the townsende of Namptwiche w^{th} all the buildings and gardens thereunto app'teyninge". It passed to the Norton family the following year, on the remarriage of Roger's widow, Margaret, to Sir Dudley Norton. In 1644, on the death of Lady Margaret Norton, the building passed to the Dodd family of Edge, from whom it was purchased by Robert Wright before 1666. In 1677, the building, by then derelict, was purchased by the town at the recommendation of Roger Wilbraham of Townsend House, and became the House of Correction and workhouse for "the undisciplined and idle poor". It remained the town's House of Correction until around 1748.

In the 18th century, the site was purchased by John Crewe of Crewe Hall. The Crewe family was by then a major Cheshire landowner with strong ties to Nantwich: Sir Ranulph Crewe, who built Crewe Hall, was born in the town, and his mother came from the Mainwaring family. John Crewe was a prominent Whig politician who served as MP for Stafford (1765–68) and Cheshire (1768–1802), and was created the first Baron Crewe in 1806. He built the existing terrace of almshouses in 1767 "in pursuance of the Wills. of Sir Thomas Crewe Knight & Sir John Crewe Knight", according to the inscription above the main entrance. Sources differ as to whether Crewe demolished the existing building on the site or converted it into the new almshouse. The almshouse was for seven families, with "decayed tradesmen" being preferred. In 1883, it was maintained by Hungerford Crewe, third Baron Crewe, the grandson of the founder. The Charity of the Crewe Almshouses was later established, with the Marchioness of Crewe and the agent of the Crewe estate being among the trustees in the 1950s–60s.

Maintenance suffered during the Second World War and, by the early 1960s, the Crewe Almshouses had become dilapidated. Four of the terraced houses were vacant and boarded up, the whole building was suffering from damp, and the gardens had become a waste tip. Nikolaus Pevsner describes the building as "a sad sight" in 1971. In 1963 the charity trustees considered it impossible to renovate the almshouses, and it was proposed to demolish the building and replace it with modern flats for the elderly. However, intervention from the National Association of Almshouses, among other bodies, led to various modernisation options being reconsidered. In 1970, a novel plan was proposed which involved moving the Wright's Almshouses – then located on London Road and also in poor condition – to stand adjacent to the Crewe Almshouses, and constructing communal facilities in a modern shared block. This was eventually agreed and, in 1973, the Crewe Almshouses charity merged with the charities administering the Wright's Almshouses and the Delves and Meakin Almshouses on Love Lane, as well as the Harriet Hope Charity, to form the "Almshouse Charities of Sir Edmund Wright, Crewe and Others". Quentin Crewe, a direct descendant of the founder, was later appointed the charity's patron. In 1973–75, a restoration programme was carried out, and the existing Crewe Almshouses building was converted into fourteen single-storey flats for the elderly. The complex was formally opened on 1 December 1975 by Princess Alexandra. The town's conservation area was extended to include the entire site.

== Description ==
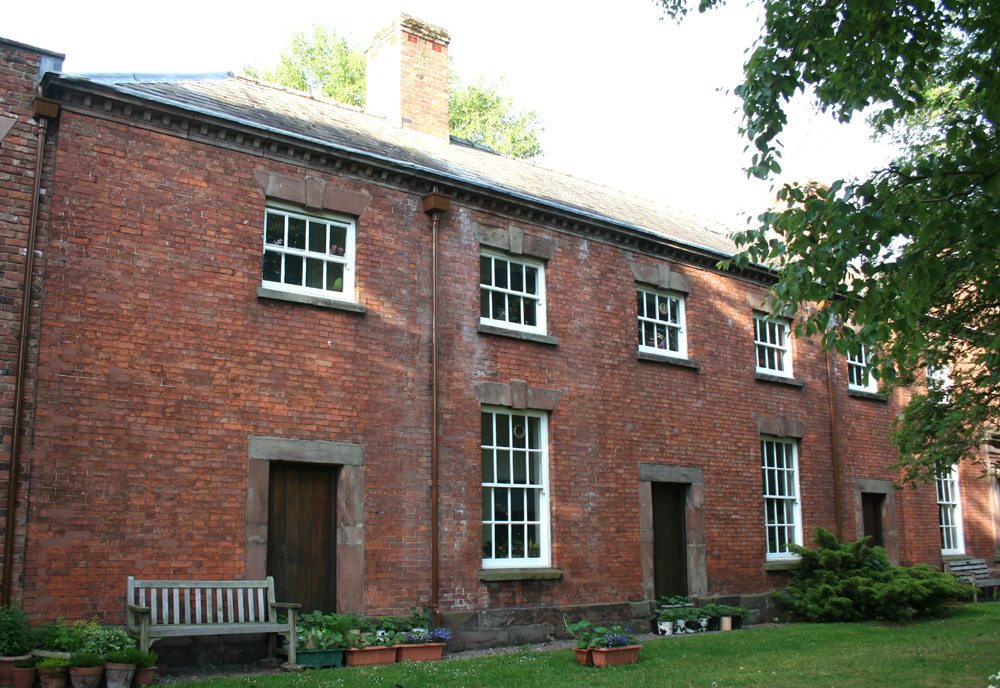
Detail of the terrace

Crewe Almshouses is a terrace of seven two-storey houses totalling thirteen bays, in red brick under a slate roof. It has a central projecting section of three bays with a circular stone decoration, which is topped with a pediment. The main entrance door is in the centre of the three-bay section; it has a stone surround with a semi-circular fanlight and decorative keystone above, and is flanked with Tuscan columns supporting a pediment, narrow flanking windows and pilasters. Above the entrance door is an inscribed stone tablet framed with decorative stonework including a keystone motif above and two corbels below. The inscription reads: "These Almshouses were erected in the Year of our Lord 1767. by John Crewe of Crewe Esq^{r}. In pursuance of the Wills. of Sir Thomas Crewe Knight & Sir John Crewe Knight." There is a stone cornice. The windows of the terrace all have stone sills and lintels, with a decorative keystone, while the terrace doors have unornamented stone surrounds.

== Modern usage ==
The Crewe Almshouses remain in use as sheltered flats for the elderly. They are now administered by a joint body of trustees for all the surviving Nantwich almshouses, together with the adjacent Wright's and Harriet Hope Almshouses.

== See also ==
- Listed buildings in Nantwich
- List of almshouses in the United Kingdom
