= Dorfold Hall =

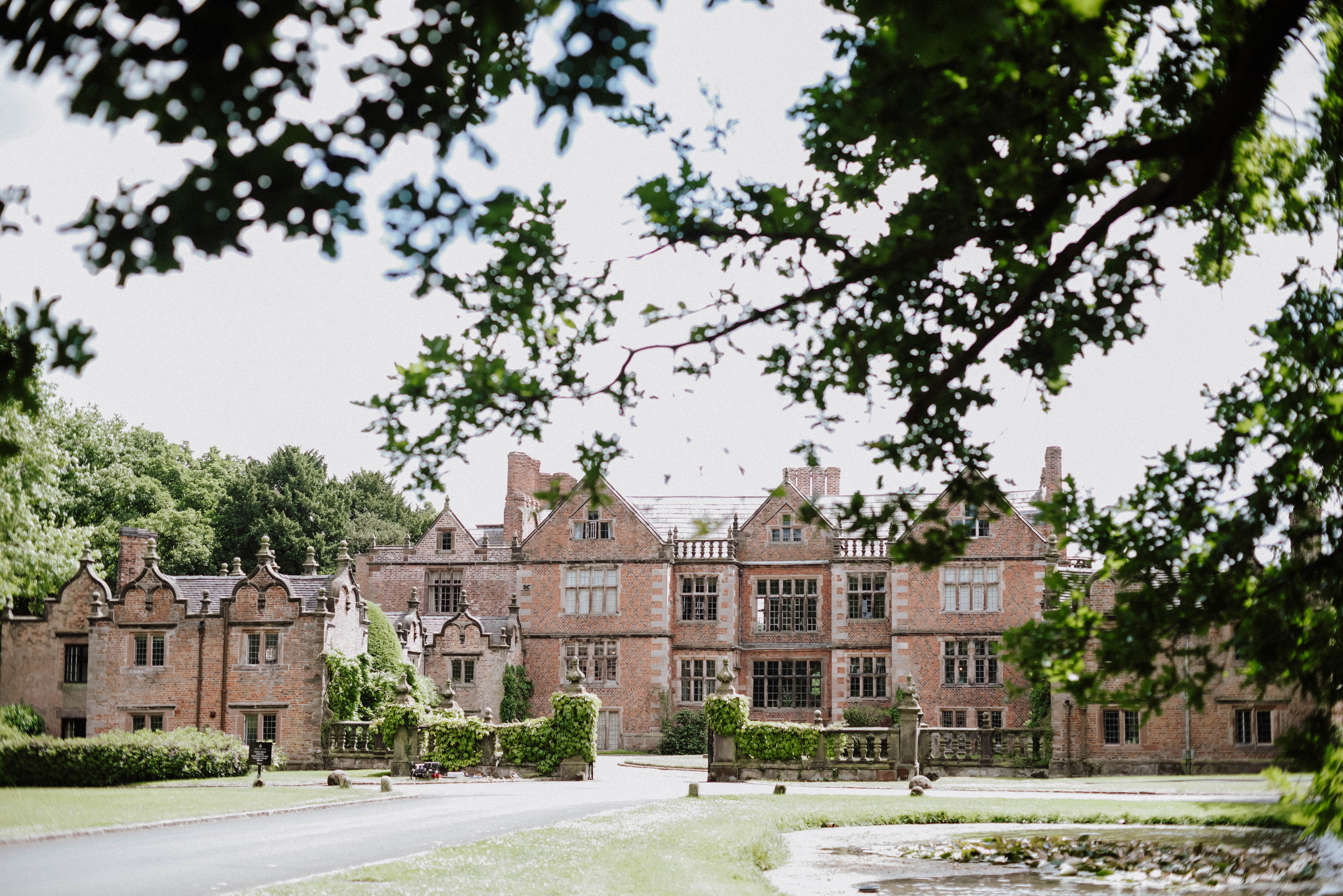
- Dorfold Hall: main (front) façade

- Location in Cheshire
- 53.0685°N 2.5451°W
- Location: Acton, Cheshire, England

History
- Built: 1616–21

Site notes
- Architectural style: Jacobean

Listed Building – Grade I
- Official name: Dorfold Hall
- Designated: 10 June 1952
- Reference no.: 1312869

National Register of Historic Parks and Gardens
- Official name: Dorfold Hall
- Designated: 10 June 1985
- Reference no.: 1000641
- Grade: II

Dorfold Hall (SJ635524) is a Grade I listed Jacobean mansion in Acton, Cheshire, England, considered by Nikolaus Pevsner to be one of the two finest Jacobean houses in the county. The present owners are the Roundells.

== History ==
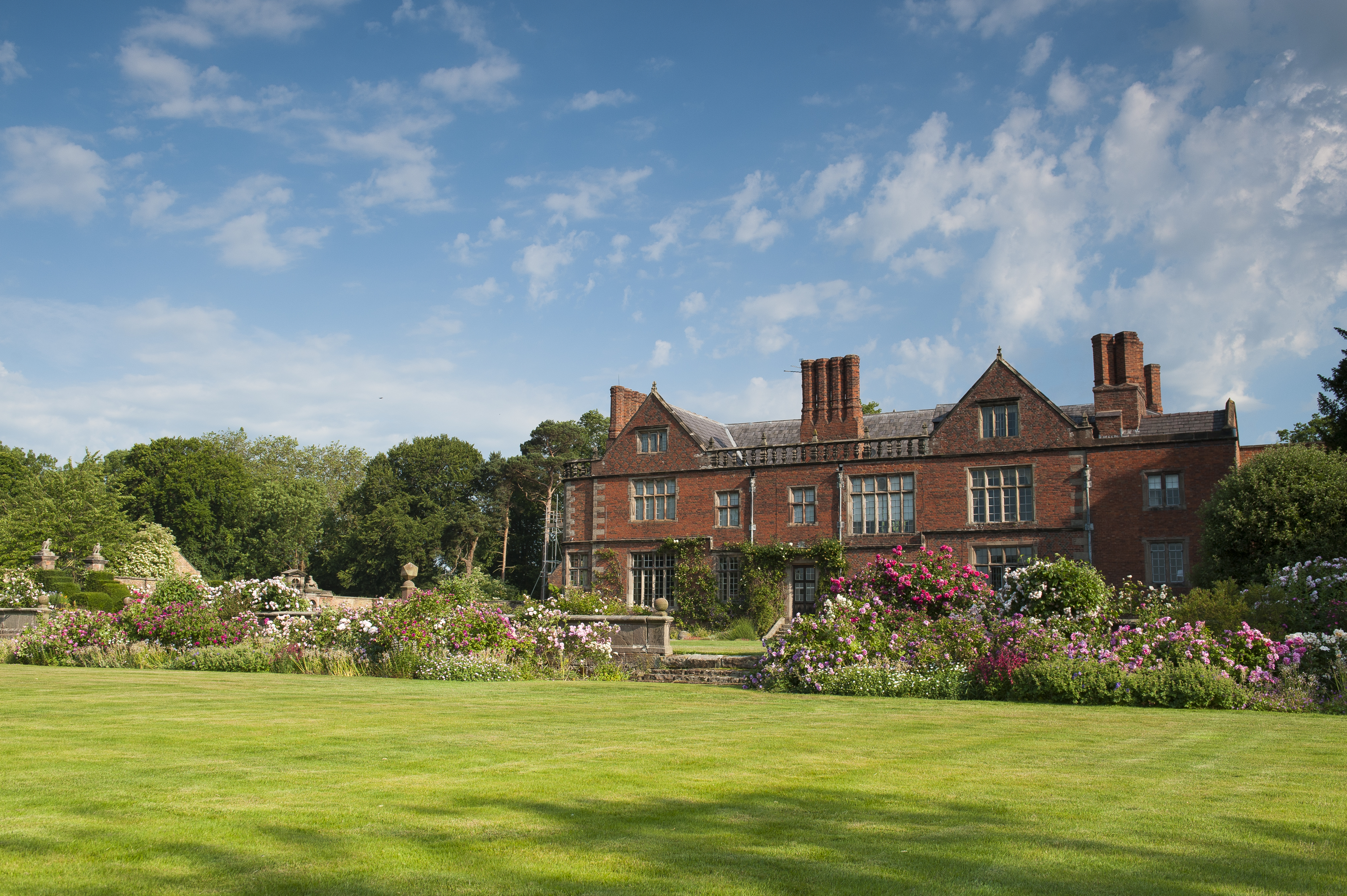
Rear façade

Dorfold or Deofold means "cattle enclosure" or "deer park". It does not appear in the Domesday survey, but according to some sources Edwin, Earl of Mercia, elder brother of Earl Morcar and brother-in-law to Harold II, had a hall there before the Conquest. A manor at Dorfold is recorded in Henry III's reign (1216–1272); early landowners were the Wettenhall, Arderne, Davenport, Stanley and Bromley families.

The estate was purchased in 1602 by Sir Roger Wilbraham, a prominent lawyer who served as Solicitor-General for Ireland under Elizabeth I and held positions at court under James I. Dorfold Hall was constructed in 1616–1621 for his younger brother and heir, Ralph Wilbraham, on the site of the earlier hall. In 1754, the estate was sold to Nantwich lawyer James Tomkinson, originally from Bostock.

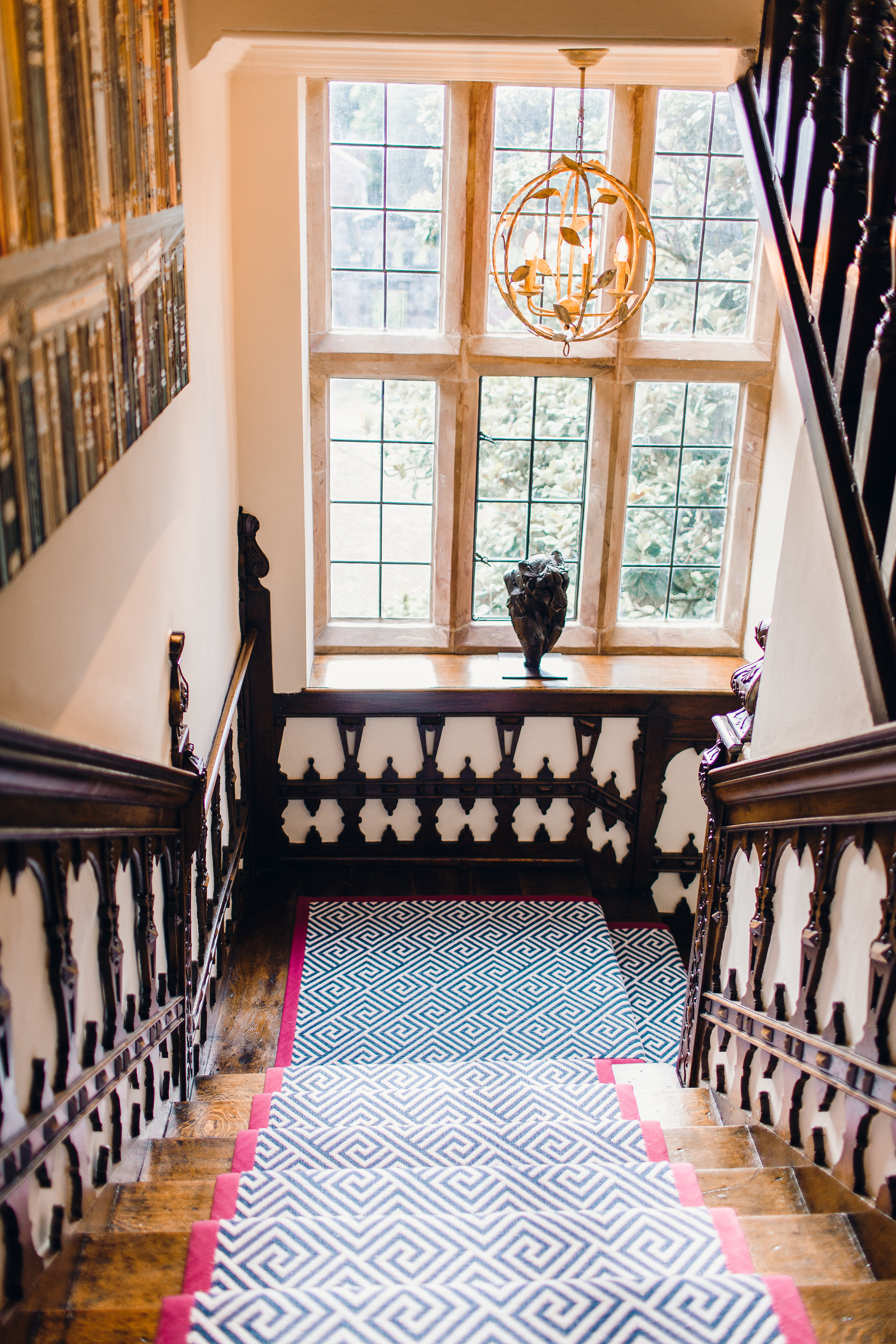
The Jacobean Staircase

He employed Samuel Wyatt to alter some of the downstairs rooms in the house. The Dorfold Estate passed back to descendants of the Wilbraham family in 1861 on inheritance by Anne Tollemache, the wife of Wilbraham Spencer Tollemache, who became High Sheriff of Cheshire in 1865. The grounds of the hall were remodelled in 1861–1862, with the construction of several buildings including the gate lodge. In August 1896, the hall received a royal visit from Princess Louise.

During the Second World War, refugees, mainly from Liverpool, were housed at the hall until November 1940, when the park became a camp for Canadian soldiers.

== Description ==
Dorfold Hall is a two-storey building on a double-pile plan in red brick with stone dressings. The main façade features a recessed centre with two small wings and large windows.

=== Grounds ===
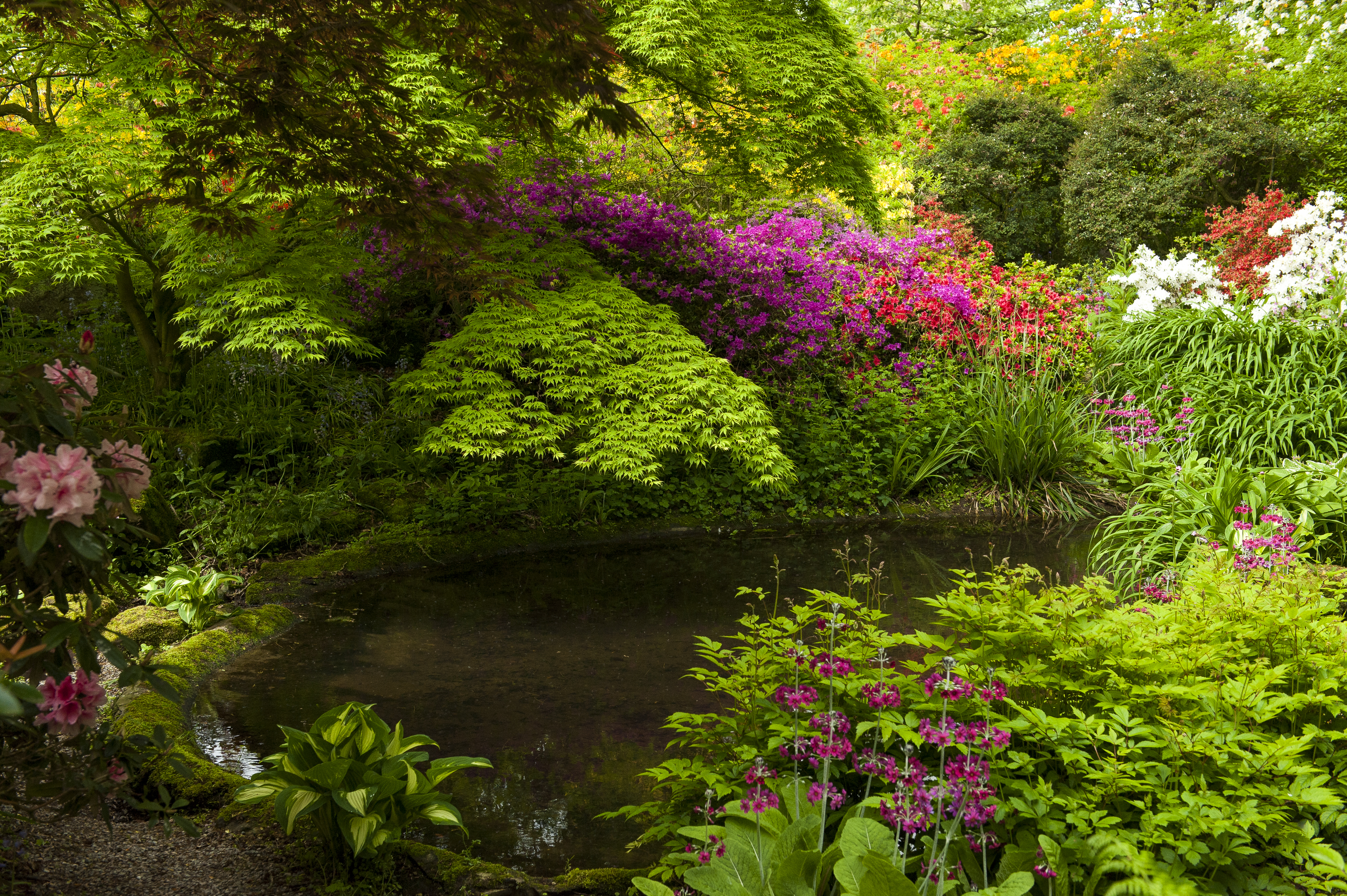
The Victorian Dell

The National Register of Historic Parks and Gardens lists 8 hectares of the grounds at grade II. The park includes a lake.

A grade-II*-listed gateway now situated in the wall to the west of the hall formerly belonged to Sir Roger Wilbraham's almshouses in Nantwich. The wrought-iron gate features a sun motif with scrolls; it stands in a moulded stone opening flanked by niches containing busts of King James I and Anne of Denmark and surmounted by lions. Several other buildings within the park are also listed at grade II. The oldest of these is an icehouse with a circular underground chamber lined with red brick which probably dates from the late 18th century.

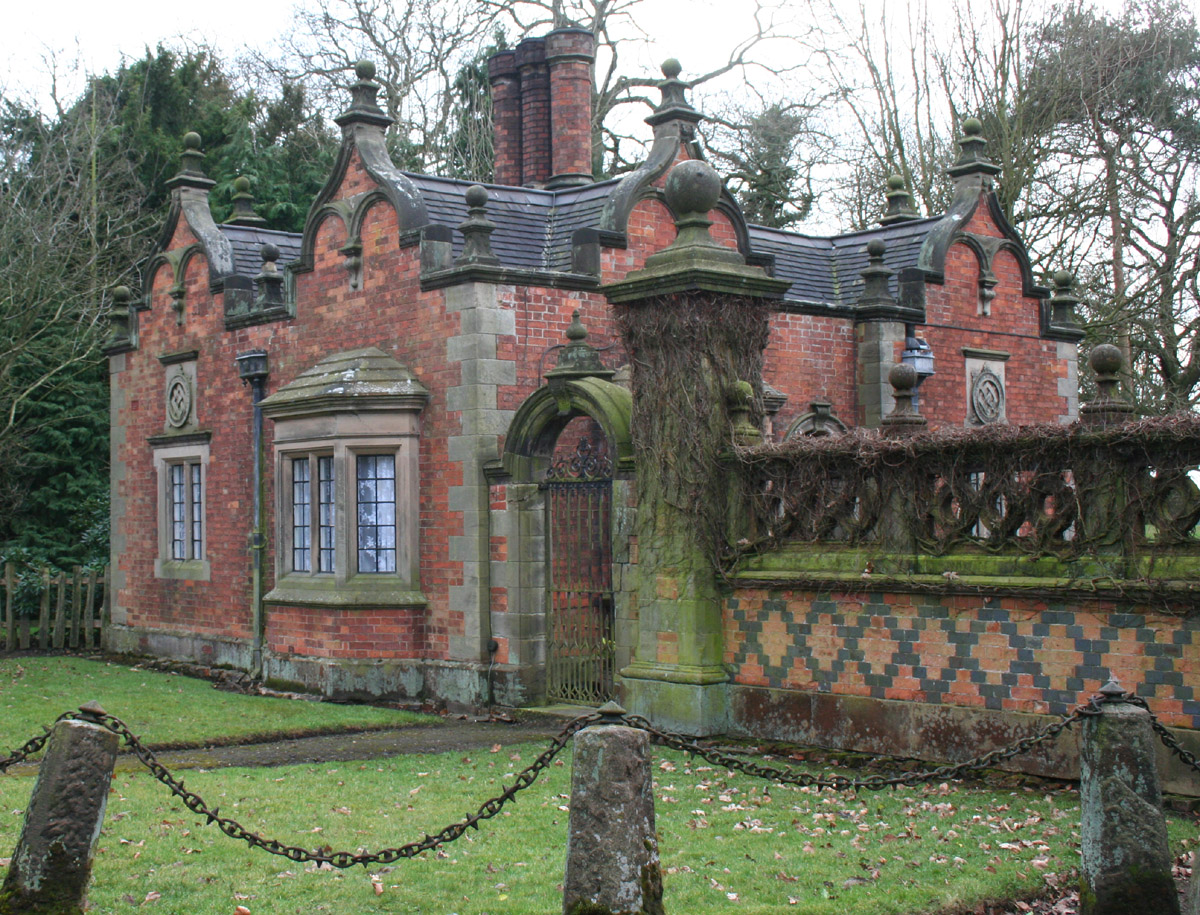
Gate lodge of Dorfold Hall

The reconstruction of the grounds by William Nesfield in 1861–1862 also resulted in several structures that are now listed. The Jacobean-style gate lodge on Chester Road is in red brick with stone dressings and blue brick decoration. The clock tower over the carriage house features stone frames to the clock dials and is topped by a wooden finial with a weather vane. A large iron statue of a mastiff with puppies oversetting a food bowl stands in the forecourt of the hall; it is attributed to Pierre Louis Rouillard and came from the Paris Exhibition of 1855.

=== Estate ===
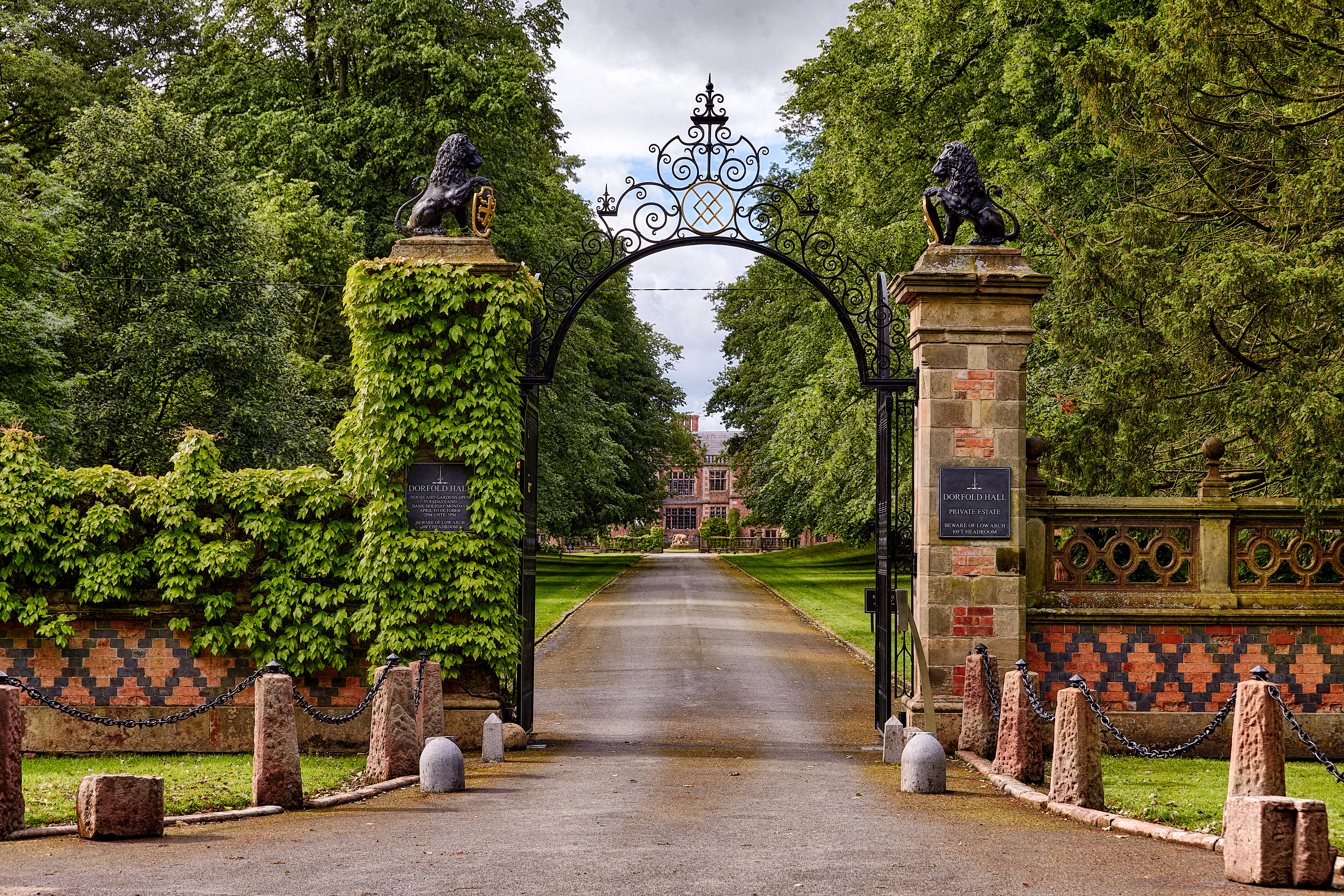
Main gates

The Dorfold Estate covers much of the civil parish of Acton, and includes farmhouses, farmland, woodland and historic parkland.

Dorfold Dairy House was formerly the estate's home farm; a three-storey, three-bay, U-shaped building in red brick dating from the late 17th century, it is listed at grade II*. The adjacent red-brick farm building is grade II listed. Madam's Farm (SJ625525) has always been a working farm and is a three-storey, three-bay, T-shaped building in red brick, it is listed at grade II.

== Nantwich and South Cheshire Show ==
Dorfold Hall Park hosts the annual Nantwich and South Cheshire Show, a single-day agricultural show with trade stalls and ring displays organised by the Nantwich Agricultural Society. In 2006, the event drew an estimated 32,000 visitors. The show includes the Nantwich International Cheese Awards, established in 1897 and claimed to be the largest cheese exhibition in Europe. The 2007 Cheese Show attracted 2,250 entries from 24 countries.

== See also ==
- Grade I listed buildings in Cheshire East
- Listed buildings in Acton, Cheshire
- List of works by Thomas Harrison
