= Roger Wilbraham =

English lawyer and Solicitor-General for Ireland

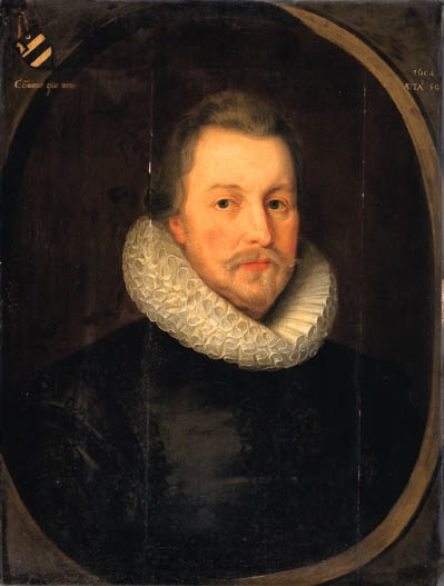
Sir Roger Wilbraham

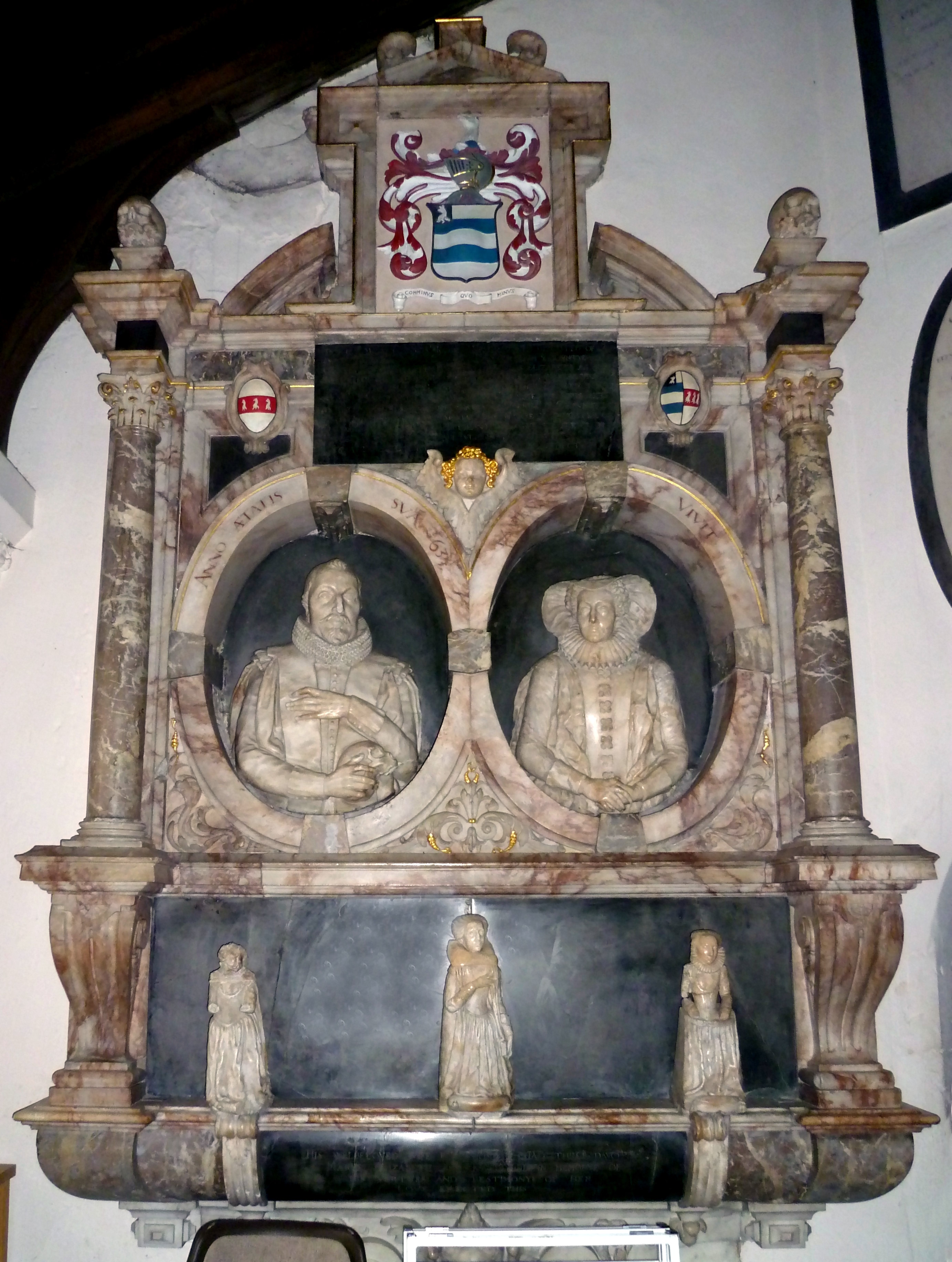
The Roger Wilbraham monument in St Mary the Virgin church, Monken Hadley

Sir Roger Wilbraham (4 November 1553 – 31 July 1616) was a prominent English lawyer who served as Solicitor-General for Ireland, under Elizabeth I and was judged one of her few really competent Law Officers. He held a number of positions at court under James I, including Master of Requests and surveyor of the Court of Wards and Liveries. He bought an estate at Dorfold in the parish of Acton, near his birthplace of Nantwich in Cheshire. He was active in charitable works locally, including founding two sets of almshouses for impoverished men. He also founded almshouses in Monken Hadley, Middlesex, where he is buried.

== Biography ==
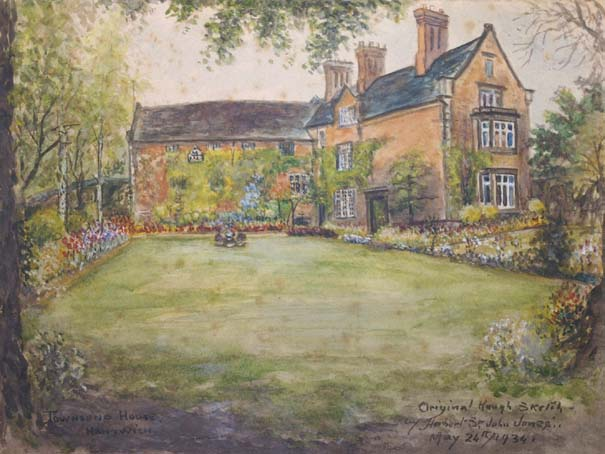
Townsend House (by Herbert St. John Jones in 1934)

Roger Wilbraham was born in Nantwich, Cheshire in 1553, the second of four sons of Richard Wilbraham (1525–1611/12) and his first wife, Elizabeth (d. 1589/90), daughter of Thomas Maisterson. The Wilbraham family was a junior branch of the Wilbrahams of Woodhey, who were prominent in Cheshire affairs from the 13th century onwards; Roger's daughter Elizabeth married into the senior branch of the family.

His father Richard served as Master of the Jewel House to Mary I and also collected revenues for the queen in the Nantwich Hundred. In 1580 Richard built Townshend House on Welsh Row in Nantwich, where James I stayed during his visit to the town in 1617. Roger's maternal family, the Maistersons, were one of the most important families in Nantwich.

== Solicitor-General for Ireland ==
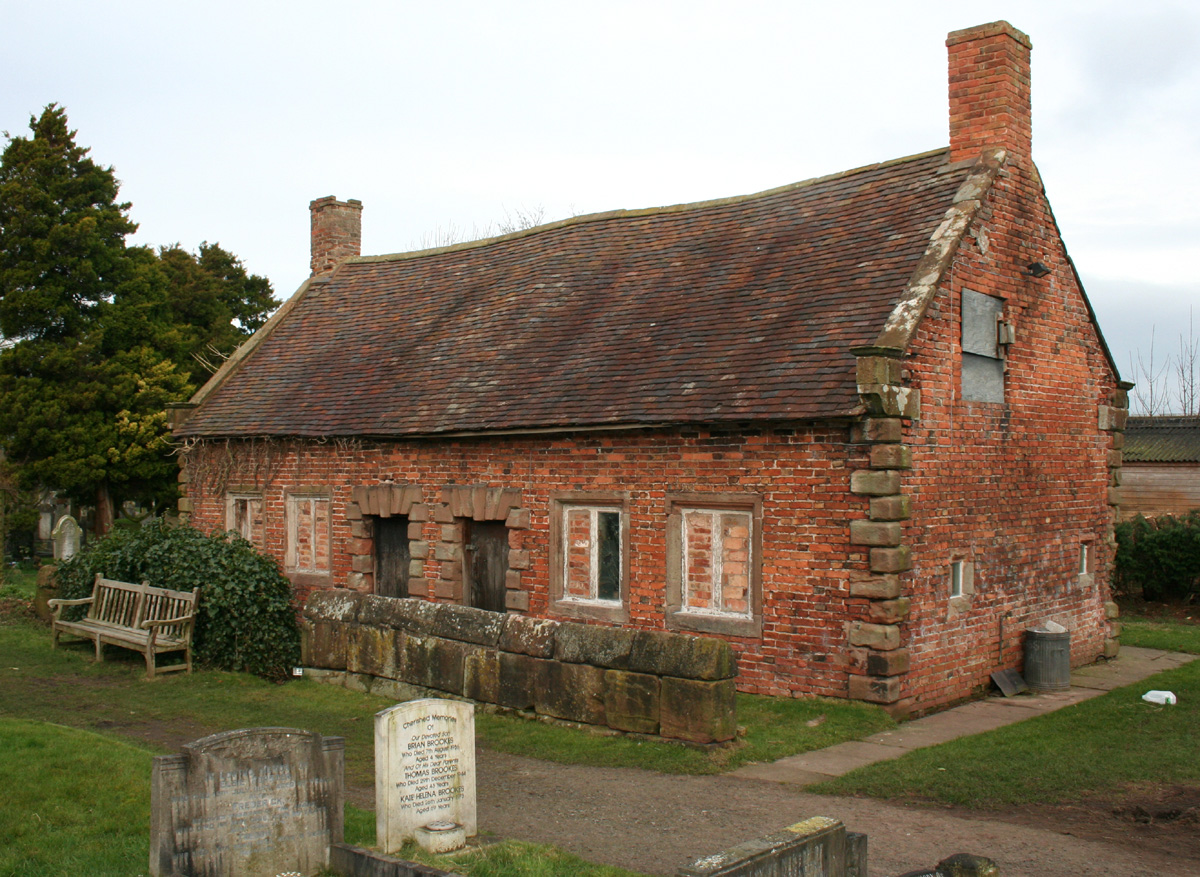
Almshouses in Acton founded by Sir Roger Wilbraham

Wilbraham was educated at Shrewsbury School and Cambridge University. He became a barrister, and was admitted to Gray's Inn in London in 1576.

On 13 February 1585, he was appointed Solicitor-General for Ireland, a position he held for 17 years, although he frankly admitted that he saw it as the pathway to a more senior position at the English Court.

During his years in Ireland, the Irish judiciary were notorious for corruption, and for bitter feuds among themselves; shortly before his arrival in Ireland Nicholas Nugent, the Chief Justice of the Irish Common Pleas, had been hanged for treason on very thin evidence, after a trial presided over by hostile colleagues. Wilbraham's attitude to judicial misconduct was cynical and pragmatic: even where a judge's conduct on occasion was disgraceful, if he generally gave good service to the Crown then, unless he was convicted of treason or another capital crime, Wilbraham argued that he should not be punished for it, or removed from office.

Wilbraham himself undoubtedly gave good service to the Crown: in 1597 the Privy Council of Ireland, in a letter to Sir Robert Cecil lamenting the inefficiency of the Irish law officers (especially the recently deceased King's Serjeant, Arthur Corye), exempted Wilbraham from their criticisms, as "he hath taken more care and pains than all the rest". He did much to increase the Crown revenues, and although he made a substantial profit in the process, this was not then regarded as corruption. In 1597 a complaint was made that he was keeping all the fees for making grants on the Exchequer of Ireland for himself, rather than sharing them with the other law officers and the Chief Remembrancer (a senior official in the Exchequer). The Dublin government appears to have ignored the complaint, no doubt because of its firm belief, expressed forcefully in its letter to Cecil the same year, that Wilbraham was the only one of the law officers who did his job efficiently. In 1590-3, when the Attorney-General for Ireland, Sir Charles Calthorpe, was suspended from duty, Wilbraham coped efficiently with his double workload. In his last years as Solicitor-General, he spent almost all of his time in England, rebuilding his legal practice.

== Later career ==
On 1 May 1600, while still serving as Solicitor, he became the Master of Requests, a post he retained under James I, and he also served as the king's surveyor of the Court of Wards and Liveries. In his journal, he commented acerbically on the added burden of work which followed James' accession, due to the flood of requests for favours. He finally stepped down as Solicitor in 1603. He was elected a member of parliament for Callington in 1604 and returned as knight of the shire (MP) for Cheshire in 1614. He enjoyed the patronage of Robert Cecil, who was well aware of his record of Crown service in Ireland, and that he was a reliable supporter of the Crown's policy. In the debate on the Union, he was one of the few English MPs who strongly supported the proposed Union between England and Scotland. He was prepared to give Cecil his support for his cherished project, the Great Contract (an unsuccessful attempt to put the Crown finances on a stable footing), but without much enthusiasm: in his journal, he notes how little support there was for the Great Contract in the House of Commons, and the proposal eventually lapsed. He received a knighthood before 1613. He kept a journal from 1593 to the end of his life: this shows him to have been a shrewd observer of the political scene, rather than a major political figure in his own right. He was also active in Nantwich's salt-making industry.

== Family life ==
He married Mary Baber, daughter of Edward Baber MP, of Chew Magna, Somerset, Recorder of Bath, and his wife Katherine Leigh, daughter of Sir Thomas Leigh, Lord Mayor of London, in January 1599/1600. The couple had three girls, Mary, Elizabeth and Catherine. After his death his widow remarried Sir Thomas Delves, 1st Baronet, and died in 1644.

Roger purchased the Dorfold estate in the parish of Acton near Nantwich in 1602. Shortly afterwards, he gave the estate to his youngest brother, Ralph, who built the present Dorfold Hall on the site of the earlier hall in 1616–21.

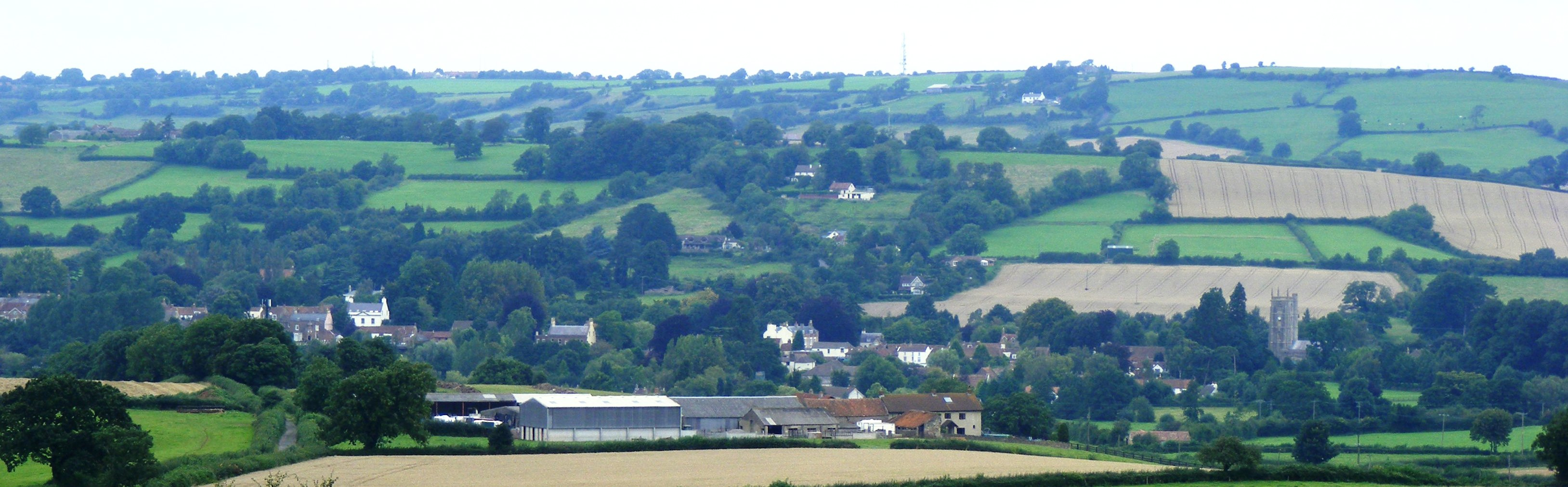
Chew Magna, the family home of Wilbraham's wife, Mary Baber

He died on 31 July 1616 at Monken Hadley, Middlesex (now in the London Borough of Barnet), of "an Ague", an acute fever, most likely malaria. He is buried at Monken Hadley. A wall monument by Nicholas Stone commemorating Wilbraham and his family was erected in the Church of St Mary the Virgin, Monken Hadley in 1616, at a cost of £80. It has busts of Wilbraham and his wife, as well as figures of their daughters.

His three daughters inherited an income supposed to amount to £4000 annually. Mary married Sir Thomas Pelham, 2nd Baronet, Elizabeth married her distant cousin Sir Thomas Wilbraham, 2nd Baronet, and Catherine married Sir Henry Delves, 2nd Baronet, the eldest son of her stepfather Sir Thomas by his first wife.

== Charitable works ==
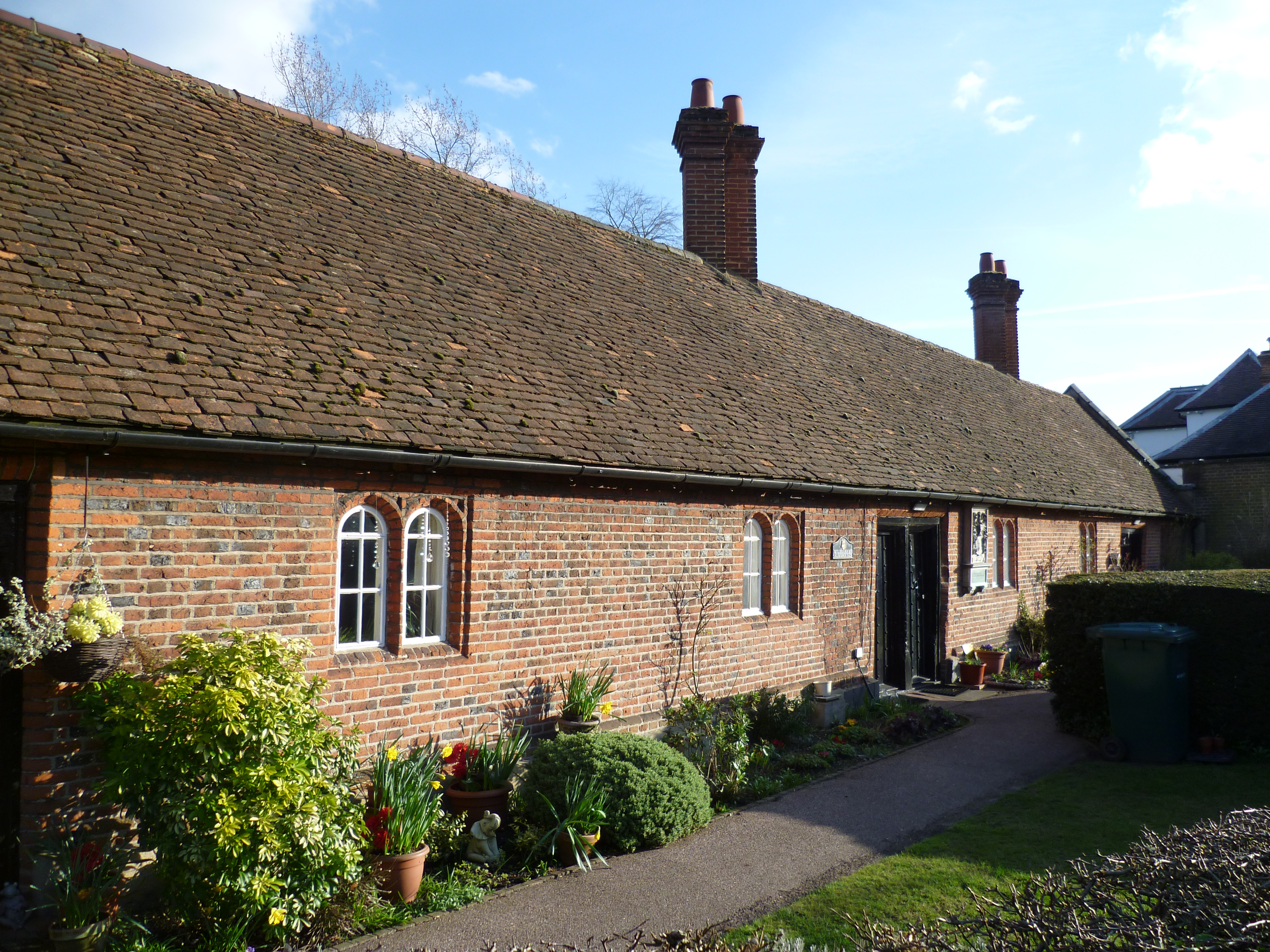
Wilbraham Almshouses, Monken Hadley

In 1613, Sir Roger founded Wilbraham's Almshouses for the support of six poor men. They were situated at the end of Welsh Row in Nantwich, and were the town's earliest almshouses. He also founded almshouses for the support of two poor men in Acton in the same year. Additionally, he gave £4 to be distributed among the poor of Nantwich on Good Friday every year. He was also active in Monken Hadley, founding almshouses for the care of "six decayed housekeepers" in 1616.

== References and sources ==
Sources

- de Figueiredo P, Treuherz J. Cheshire Country Houses (Phillimore; 1988) (ISBN 0-85033-655-4)
- Garton E. Tudor Nantwich: A Study of Life in Nantwich in the Sixteenth Century (Cheshire County Council Libraries and Museums; 1983) (ISBN 0 903017 05 9)
- Hall J. A History of the Town and Parish of Nantwich, or Wich Malbank, in the County Palatine of Chester (2nd edn) (E. J. Morten; 1972) (ISBN 0-901598-24-0)
- Lamberton A, Gray R. Lost Houses in Nantwich (Landmark Publishing; 2005) (ISBN 1 84306 202 X)
- Latham FA, ed. Acton (The Local History Group; 1995) (ISBN 0 9522284 1 6)
- Wilbraham R. The journal of Sir Roger Wilbraham, solicitor-general in Ireland and master of requests, for the years 1593–1616, together with notes in another hand, for the years 1642–1649 (Scott HS, ed.) (1902)
