= Combermere House, Nantwich =

House in Nantwich, Cheshire, England

Coordinates: 53.0655°N 2.5146°W

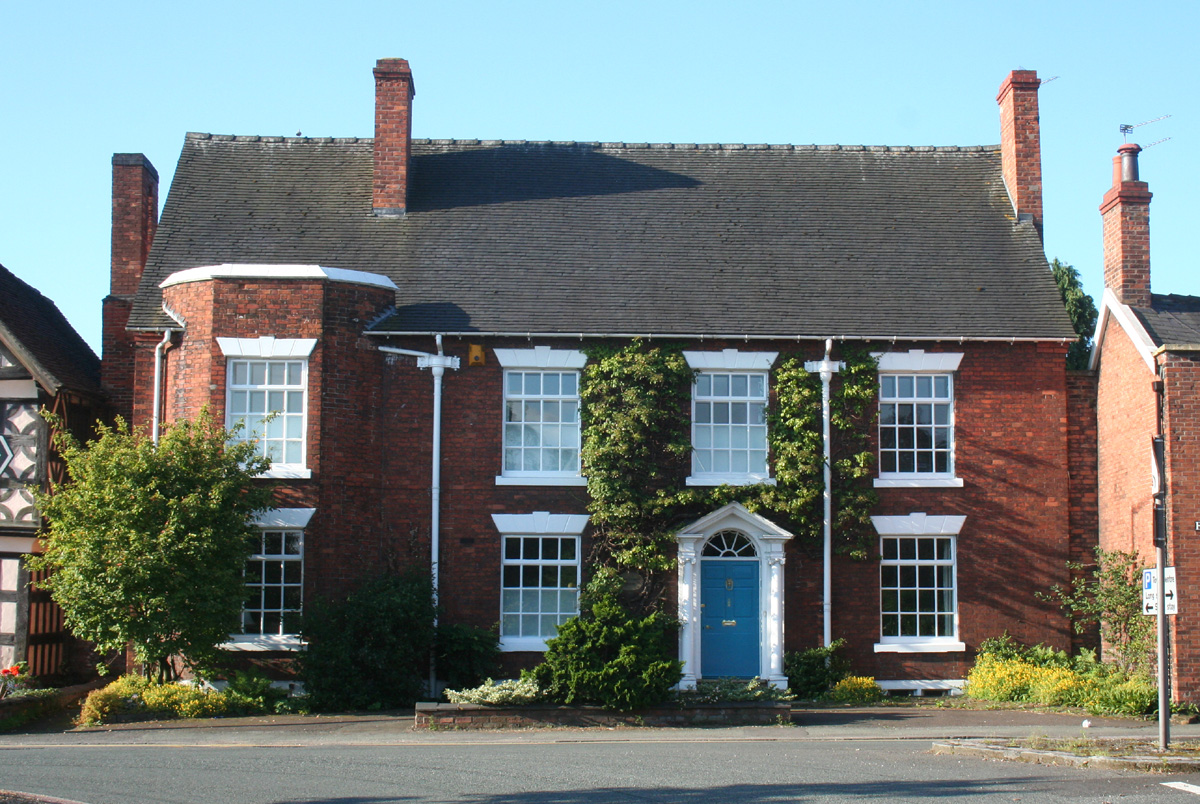
Combermere House, 148 Hospital Street, Nantwich

Combermere House, or 148 Hospital Street, is a Georgian town house in Nantwich, Cheshire, England, which dates from the mid-18th century. It is on the south side of Hospital Street (at SJ6561152154), near the end of the street and opposite the junction with Millstone Lane. The building has previously been known by other street numbers, including number 154. It is listed at grade II, and local historian Jane Stevenson describes it as "sheer perfection".

The end of Hospital Street contains many notable buildings. Combermere House is adjacent to Churche's Mansion, an Elizabethan mansion which is listed at grade I. It stands opposite The Rookery and near numbers 116 and 140–142, other town houses of Georgian appearance; however, unlike these buildings, there is no evidence that Combermere House incorporates a 15th or 16th century structure. Combermere House is believed to stand near the site of the medieval Hospital of St Nicholas, which gives Hospital Street its name.

== History ==
The building was constructed in the mid-18th century. In the 1890s, it was remodelled by local architect Thomas Bower, who lived nearby at 140–142 Hospital Street. It was formerly used as a private school, known as Nuthurst Garden School. It acquired the name Combermere House in June 1962.

== Description ==
Combermere House is a substantial detached building, set a little back from the street behind a narrow garden. It has four bays and two storeys, in red brick with stone dressings under a tiled roof. The front façade is asymmetrical; there is a single-bay projection bay on the left, which is topped with a parapet with a stone coping. The remainder of the façade is three bays wide, with a central entrance.

Nikolaus Pevsner praises the "pretty classical doorway". The stone doorcase, described as "good" by English Heritage in the listing, has Ionic columns; there is a semicircular fanlight with a pediment above. The sash windows to the front face all have stone lintels with decorative keystones. The building retains two old lead rainwater heads.

== See also ==
- Listed buildings in Nantwich
