= Sweetbriar Hall =

House in Nantwich, Cheshire, England

Coordinates: 53°03′58″N 2°31′07″W

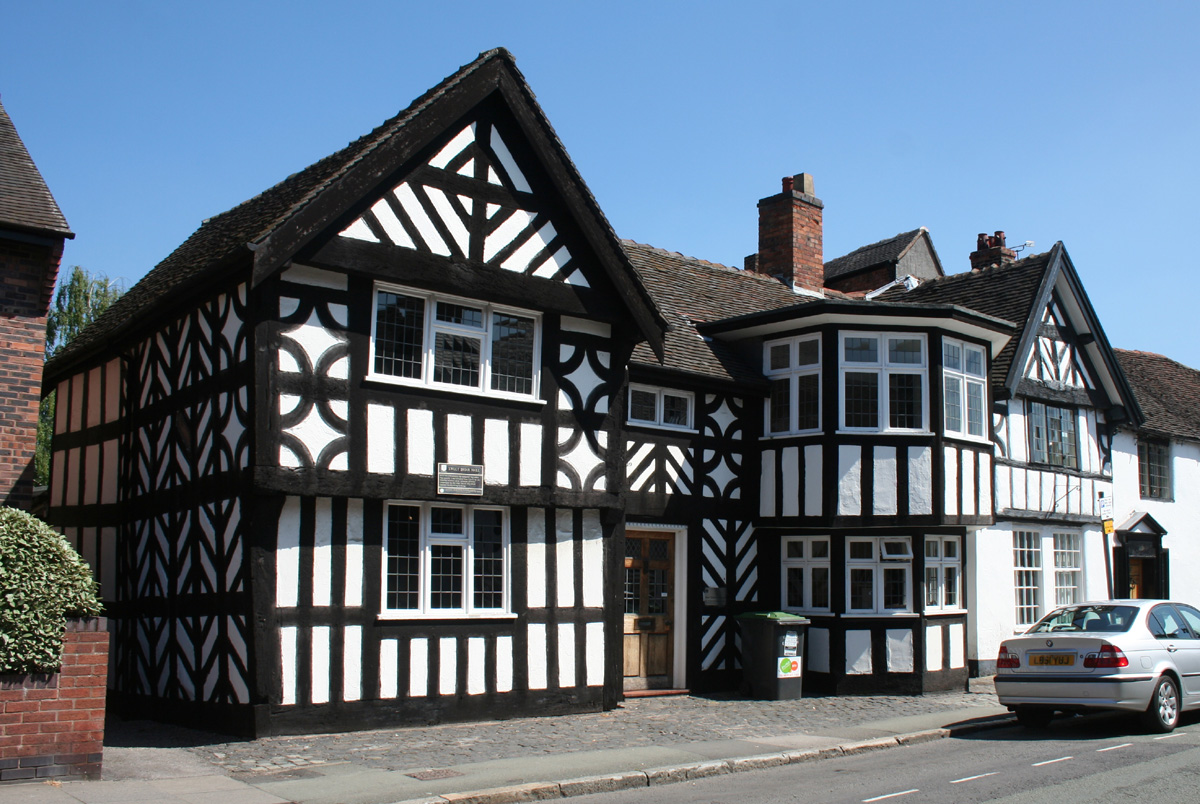
Sweetbriar Hall, Hospital Street, Nantwich

Sweetbriar Hall (also Sweet Briar Hall and other variants) is a timber-framed, "black and white" mansion house in the town of Nantwich, Cheshire, England, at 65 and 67 Hospital Street. It has been designated by English Heritage as a Grade II listed building.

The hall was built for the Woodhey branch of the Wilbraham family. The original date is probably 15th century, and the hall is often considered the oldest half-timbered building in the town not to have been encased in brick. The external appearance is early Elizabethan, with both ornamental panelling and close studding. It was recorded in 1577, and is known to have survived the fire of 1583, which destroyed the adjacent building. It has been substantially altered from its original form, in particular with the addition of a pentagonal bay in the late 16th or early 17th centuries. The timber frame was covered with render in the 18th century, and by the mid-20th century the hall had become very dilapidated. Restoration work was carried out by James Edleston in the 1960s.

Joseph Priestley, scientist and philosopher, is believed to have lived at the hall in 1758–61, while he was minister at the nearby Unitarian chapel. Sir William Bowman, histologist, ophthalmologist and surgeon, was born there in 1816.

== Archeology ==
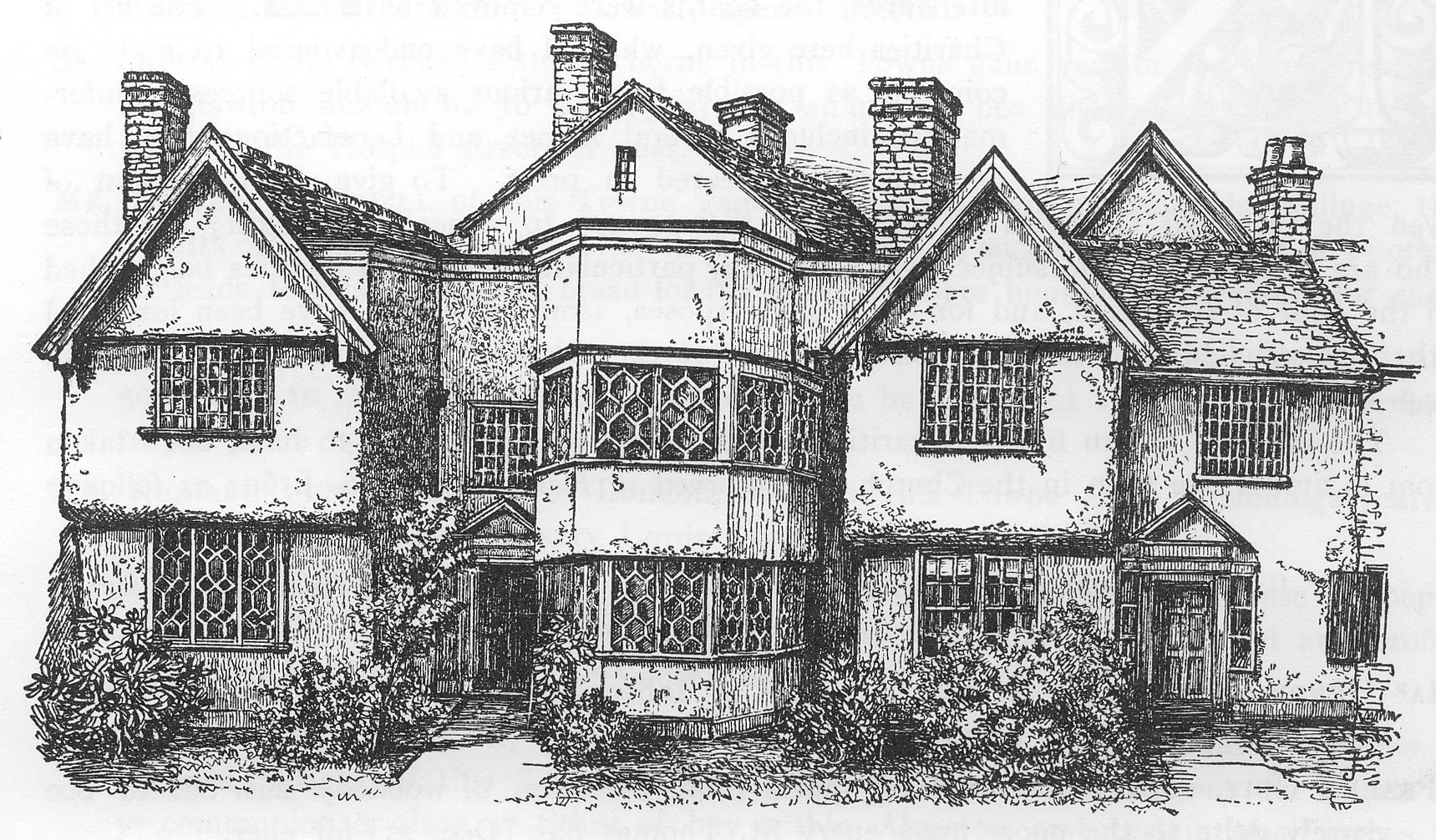
Engraving c. 1883 showing the rendered front

Pottery dating to the 12th century was found adjacent to the hall in 1974.

== History ==
Sweetbriar Hall was built for the Woodhey branch of the Wilbraham family, later associated with the country mansions of Woodhey Hall and Dorfold Hall. One of the leading Nantwich families, they had owned land in the town since the 14th century. It was known as Sweetbriar Hall in the Elizabethan era. The date of the original building is often given as 1450; some sources, however, estimate it as late 15th century to early 16th century. (Note: Sweet Briar Hall / Built late 15th century, the octagonal bay added 16th century. It was occupied from 1758~61 by Jos. Priestley, scientist, while Unitarian minister. Undamaged by the Great Fire of 1583 which reached the adjoining building.) The appearance of the building is typical early Elizabethan, that is mid-16th century. The hall is generally considered to be the oldest half-timbered building in the town that has not been encased in brick.

Hospital Street was the main road between London and Chester; the medieval St Nicholas Hospital, which gave the street its name, remained in use until 1548. Sweetbriar Hall would originally have stood at the eastern edge of the town. The north side of Hospital Street, where Sweetbriar Hall is located, was only sparsely occupied in the Tudor era; the south side of the street was marshy and little built on. Much of the area north of the hall between Hospital Street and Beam Street was owned by Combermere Abbey until its dissolution in 1538, being used as orchards, fields and gardens; it remained largely gardens and crofts when the first map of Nantwich was drawn in 1794. Other early buildings at the eastern end of Hospital Street include number 116, a house of Georgian appearance on the south side, which incorporates a substantially older timber-framed house, parts of which have been dated to the late 15th century.

Rebuilding of the hall is recorded in 1577, at the date when Churche's Mansion was built further east along Hospital Street. The hall is known to have survived the fire of 1583, which reached the adjacent building and destroyed much of the centre of the town. Richard Wilbraham's journal entry for the fire records:

...there was consumed by the same ffyeer ... all the hospell strete vpon both sydes past the myddest thereoff & dyd staye at the howse of Thoms. wryghte opon y^{e} sowth syde of the strete: And at another howse of Mr. Wylbrahms. of Woodehey wherein Randull Maynewaring dwelled upon y^{e} north syde.

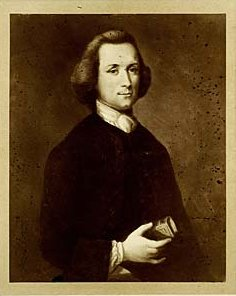
Joseph Priestley (c. 1763)

In the 17th and 18th centuries, the hall was associated with the Nonconformist movement. In 1672, it was briefly licensed for use by the Presbyterian preacher Robert Fogg; the owner was then John King. It was still owned by King in 1691, and occupied jointly by him and his tenant, the Reverend Samuel Lawrence. Lawrence was the minister of the town's first Presbyterian Meeting House in 1688–1712, and was a close friend of the well-known Presbyterian minister, Matthew Henry.

According to some sources, the scientist and philosopher Joseph Priestley lived at Sweetbriar Hall while he was in Nantwich in 1758–61. A red-brick former school at the rear of the hall dating from around 1701 has also been identified as Priestley's house. He was the minister of a Unitarian chapel, now demolished, which stood on the corner of Hospital Street and Pratchett's Row, and also established a school in an adjacent building on Hospital Street.

In 1814, retired tobacconist and grocer Eddowes Bowman bought Sweetbriar Hall from the Leversage family. His son was John Eddowes Bowman, a geologist and naturalist, and Sweetbriar Hall was the birthplace of his son, histologist, ophthalmologist and surgeon Sir William Bowman in 1816. Eddowes Bowman and John Eddowes Bowman were partners in a bank that failed in 1816, leaving the family destitute. They left Nantwich that year, and the hall was sold to Mary Bennion, passing via her sister Elizabeth to the Butterworth family, who were still living there in 1892.

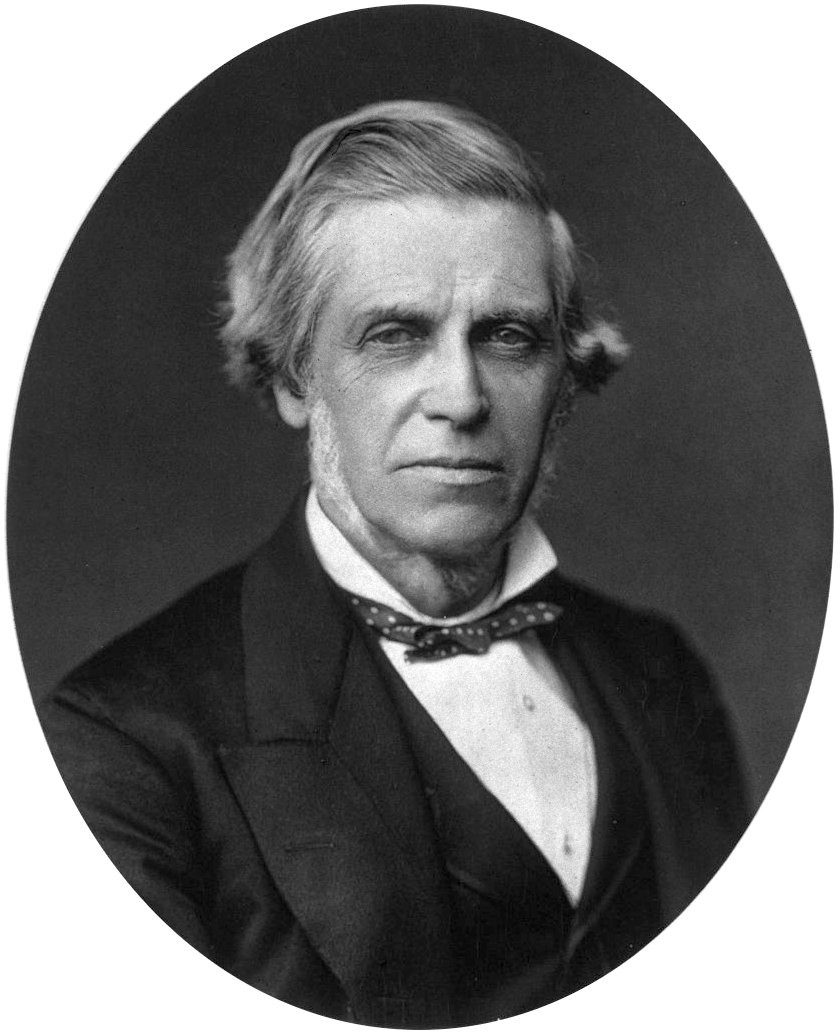
William Bowman

The hall was covered in render during the 18th century. An engraving published in James Hall's History of 1883 shows the rendered front façade with hexagonal, octagonal, rectangular and diamond-shaped window lights, two 18th-century doorcases, several tall brick chimneys and an altered roofline. In photographs from around 1900 to the 1950s, the hall has a pebble-dashed appearance and retains the old windows, doorcases and chimneys; a front garden enclosed by low iron railings is also present. The railings had been removed by 1948, presumably during the Second World War. The hall was listed on 19 April 1948, and was one of the first group of buildings in Nantwich to attain this status. During the 1940s and 1950s the hall deteriorated, and by 1958 it was in a dilapidated condition. Local architect James Edleston restored the building in the 1960s. The majority of the render was removed, as well as most of the old windows, one of the Georgian doorcases and several chimneys. The front garden also disappeared at this time.

Sweetbriar Hall is now divided into two houses. As of 2012, number 65 is used as offices for the Bower Edleston architects' practice; number 67 is residential.

== Description ==
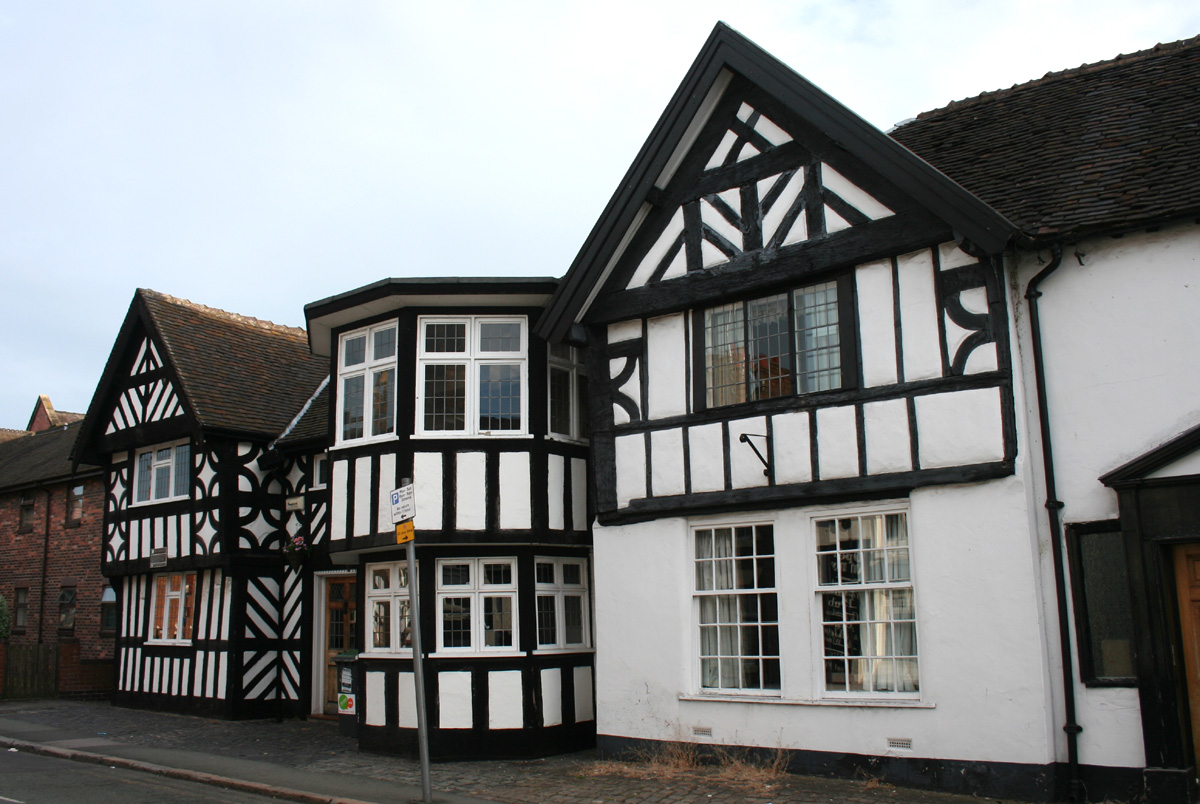
View showing the gabled bay of number 67

Sweetbriar Hall is located at numbers 65 and 67 on the north side of Hospital Street (SJ 65362 52231). It stands at the junction with an old footpath, The Gullet, now a pedestrian passage giving access to Wesley Close. Number 67 is now a separate building known as "Wayside". The hall probably formerly included the adjacent numbers 69 and 71, also listed at grade II, completing the terrace.

The hall is a timber-framed, black-and-white, two-storey building under a tiled roof. The original plan had a central hall with two cross wings, a typical rural mansion layout which is similar to that of Churche's Mansion. One cross wing (east) would have been the parlour, the other (west) the service wing, including a buttery and kitchen. The projecting pentagonal wing was added to the end of the central hall in the late 16th or early 17th century.

The timber frame to the front façade and half of the west (left) side features decorative framing, made up of small panels containing ornamental devices. Patterns include chevron bracing with middle rails, often inverted, which forms herringbone patterns and diamonds. This type of decoration is typical of early Elizabethan work (mid-16th century) and is also seen at Little Moreton Hall (c.1504–1610). Curved braces forming concave-sided diamonds are also present; this is a common motif in Cheshire, also seen at Churche's Mansion, Chorley Old Hall and Blackden Hall. The ornamental panelling is not carried to the rear of the west face, presumably for cost reasons. Close studding with a middle rail is used on the back half of the west face, as well as parts of the Hospital Street façade. This mix of decorative framing with close studding is unusual in Nantwich; other examples are Churche's Mansion and two houses built after the fire, 46 High Street and 3 Church Lane. The rear of the building has small framing.

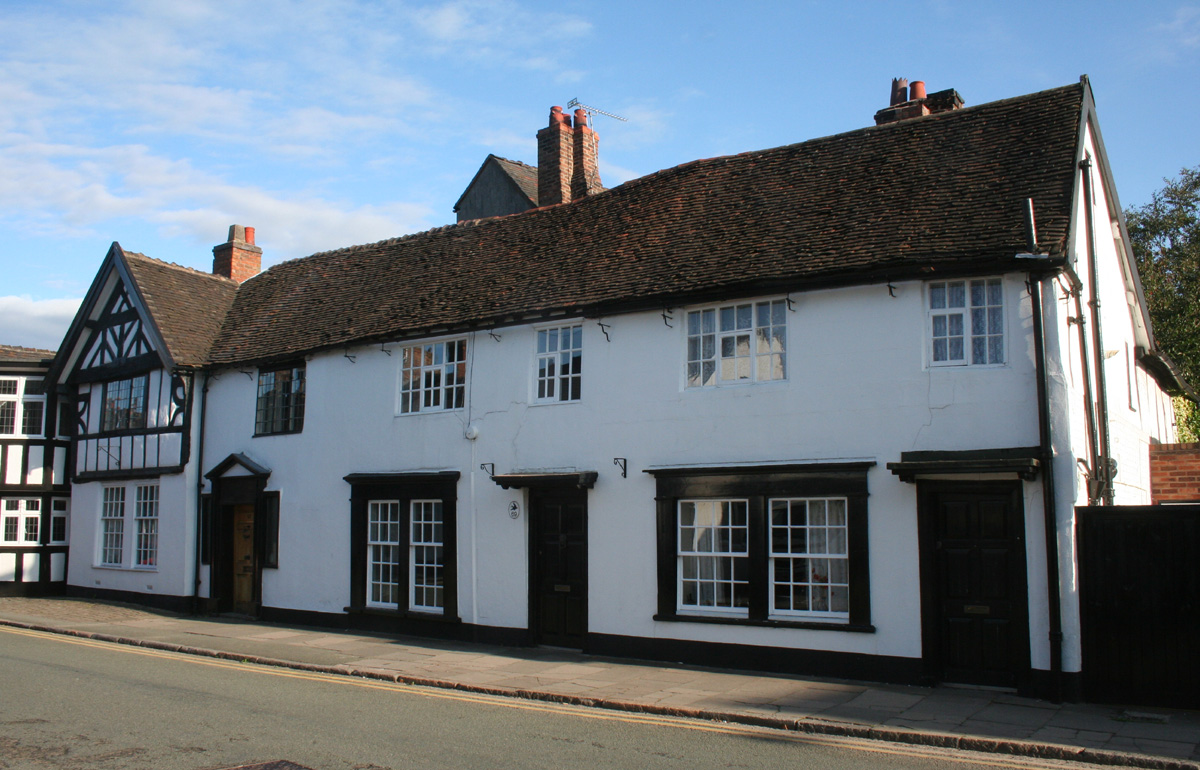
Numbers 67–71, showing the 18th-century doorcase in no. 67 (left)

In number 65, the west (leftmost) wing projects and is gabled; its Hospital Street façade has jetties to the first and second floors. The second bay has a central modern doorway. The pentagonal wing is a flat-roofed bay with a single jetty. The timber frame has been infilled with plaster and cement, and the windows in this part are all modern.

Number 67 has a gabled bay on the left, with small jetties to the first and second floors. In the right-hand bay, the 18th-century doorcase remains and is topped with a pediment. Number 67 has two iron casement windows, which probably date from the 17th century, and have small rectangular lights. Much of the timber frame in this part remains concealed behind render.

The original plan has been substantially altered over the centuries, and the interiors modernised. The internal beams of the former buttery are more crudely finished than those of the parlour, and this wing has a sandstone chimneystack. The staircases date from the late 17th or 18th century; that in number 67 has latticework in the Chinese Chippendale style. The roof truss is unusual in having a short king post from the collar beam.

== See also ==
- Listed buildings in Nantwich
