= 46 High Street, Nantwich =

House in Nantwich, Cheshire, England

Coordinates: 53.0673°N 2.5225°W

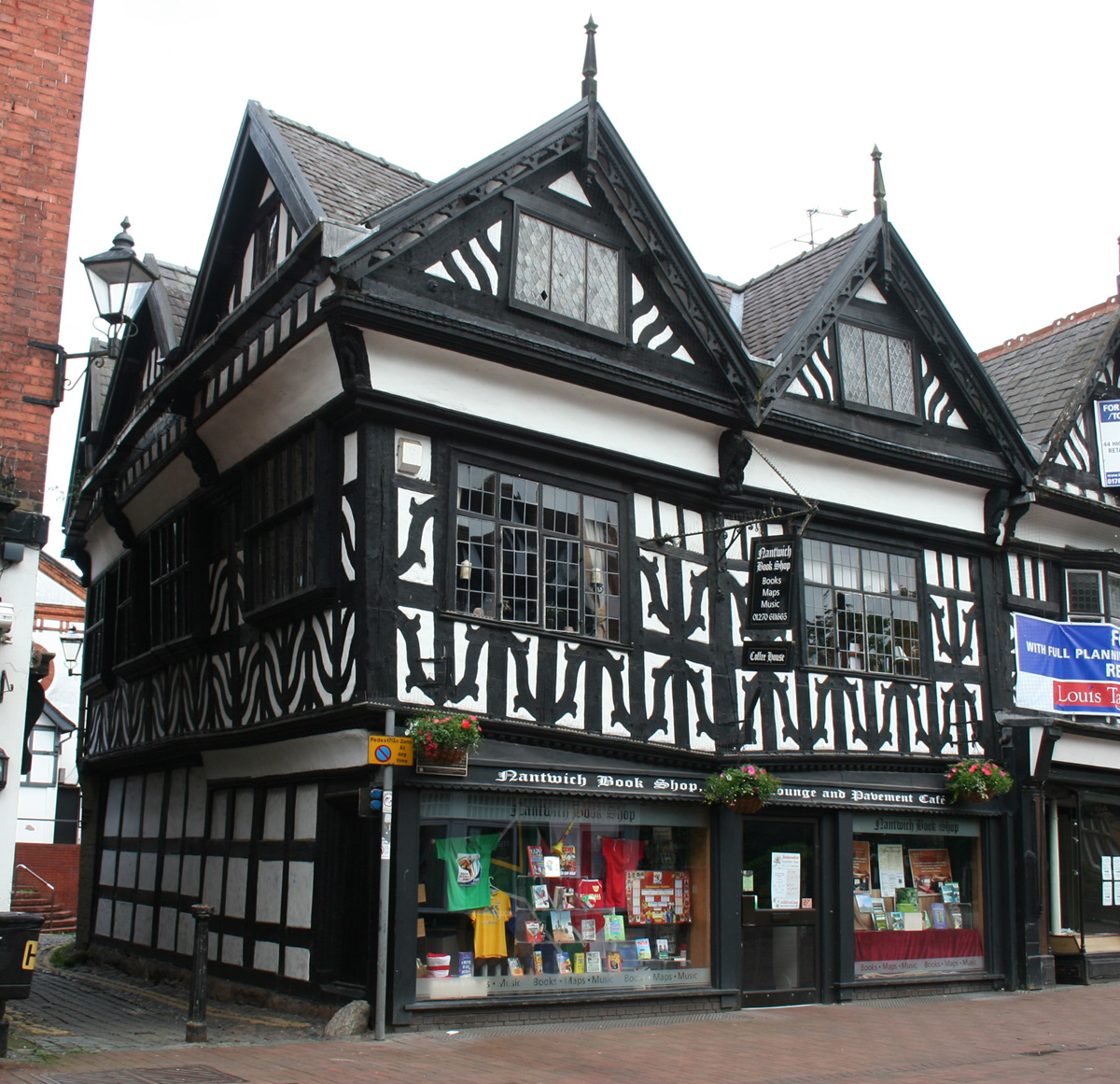
46 High Street, Nantwich

46 High Street is a timber-framed, black-and-white Elizabethan merchant's house in Nantwich, Cheshire, England, located near the town square at the corner of High Street and Castle Street. The present building dates from shortly after the fire of 1583, and is believed to have been built for Thomas Churche, a linen merchant from one of the prominent families of the town. It remained in the Churche family until the late 19th century.

High Street was the home of the wealthiest townspeople in the 1580s, and the houses dating from the rebuilding form the finest examples of post-fire architecture in the town. A substantial and fine example of its type, 46 High Street features ornamental panelling, jetties and brackets decorated with carved human figures and animals. On the interior, a first-floor room retains panelling and decorative plasterwork dating from the early 17th century. The building is listed at grade II*. It is currently used as a book shop and coffee shop.

== Archaeological findings ==
Test holes drilled during restoration work in the mid-1980s revealed that the front part of the building was built on unconsolidated ground; this was found to be 7 feet in depth and to extend 15 feet back from the High Street. Architect Jim Edleston speculates that this might represent one of the ditches of Nantwich Castle. Fabric with embroidery and leather shoe laces were recovered from the test holes.

== History ==
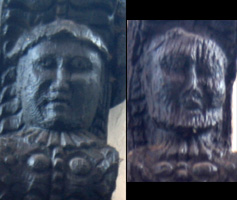
Carvings of Thomas and Anne Churche on corbels

A house stood on this site before the fire of 1583, probably built for Thomas Churche (or Church), a mercer or linen merchant. The Churche family numbered among the town's gentry during the 15–17th centuries, and Thomas was the nephew of Richard Churche, a wealthy merchant for whom Churche's Mansion on nearby Hospital Street was built. In common with almost all of the town east of the River Weaver, the house was destroyed in the fire of 1583. It was rebuilt shortly afterwards, probably in 1584, at a cost of £120, of which £20 came from the town rebuilding fund. After the rebuilding, the adjacent house (now 42–44 High Street) was owned by Richard Churche's son, William, who was also in the linen trade.

In 1586, Thomas Churche married Anne Mainwaring, who came from another prominent Nantwich family. Before its restoration, the church contained a memorial tablet with portraits of the couple. George Ormerod's History describes these as depicting "an aged male and female figure holding up their hands in prayer; both having large ruffs; the man has a venerable beard and red cap edged with lace; the female a close cap and high-crowned hat." They are also probably the subject of portraits on two of the present building's corbels. Thomas Churche died in 1635, and is buried in St Mary's Church. His will describes the house, bequeathed to his wife (who died in 1639), as "my Messuage or Burgage lyinge and beinge in Wich Malbank". The post-mortem inventory was valued at a total of £311 11s 10d; possessions mentioned in the will include a "drawing table in the Great Chamber".

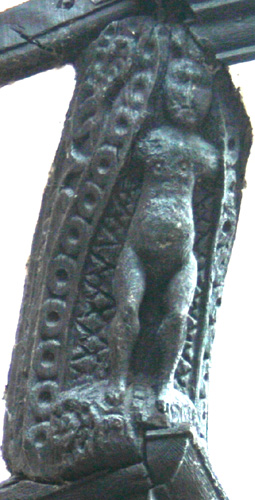
Carved caryatid

In 1723–24, the house is mentioned in the marriage settlement of Saboth Churche, Thomas Churche's great-grandson, as "One Messuage and one Shop with their Appurtenances situate in High Town [High Street] adjoining to the Pudding Lane [Castle Street]". An 1874 directory carried an advertisement for the High Street premises of William Church & Co., "general drapers, silk mercers, milliners, dressmakers, tailors, & gentlemen's mercers", and the building remained in the Churche family until a few years before James Hall's History of 1883.

The building has since housed another tailor's and draper's shop, Lovatt's (late 19th century), and been the premises for two ironmongers, George Bros. (from 1900) and Frank Clayton (mid-20th century), and the electrical retailer, Rumbelows (c. 1970s–1990s). It became a bookshop in 1997, initially in the Bookland chain, and became the independent Nantwich Bookshop in 2003.

== Description ==
46 High Street is located at SJ 65099 52305, on the corner of High Street and Castle Street, immediately south west of the town square. It is a timber-framed building of two storeys with attics. It has two gables to the front face on High Street and three gables to the side on Castle Street. The High Street face abuts the adjacent house (42–44 High Street), which was built at the same time. The first and attic floors on the High Street face are not horizontal; the noticeable dip in the centre is caused by subsidence, and was already evident in a photograph dated around 1890. The external timbers are painted black, with white-painted plaster panels, giving a black-and-white appearance. There are large jetties to the first floor and attic storey, not only on the front face but also on the Castle Street side; usually only the main street face was jettied. The jetties all feature plaster coving underneath. The corbels (brackets) all bear carvings featuring human and animal subjects against a decorative background. These include two carved busts on the first floor jetties of the Castle Street face, which are probably portraits of Thomas and Anne Churche, and are similar to those of Richard and Margerye Churche at Churche's Mansion. Other carvings include a nude caryatid (female figure supporting a structure) on the corner, a Renaissance device, as well as a sheep, a bear and a half-length portrait of a clothed woman.

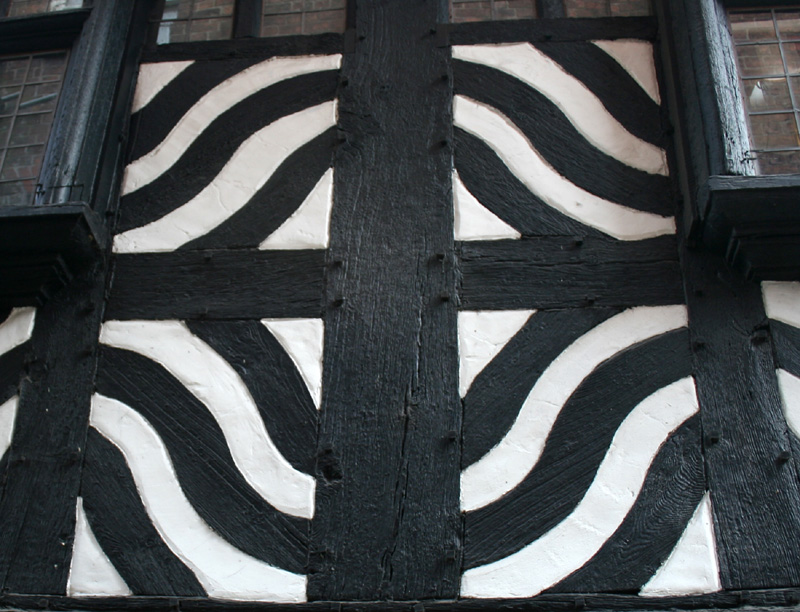
Decorative panel from Castle St face

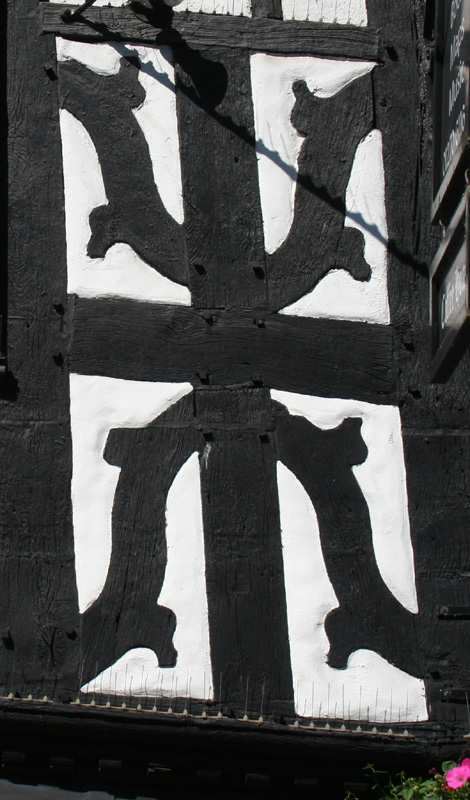
Decorative panel from High St face

Both the High Street and Castle Street faces have decorative framing on the two upper storeys, which is made up of small panels containing ornamental devices. The design uses ogee bracing, similar to that at Churche's Mansion; it is elaborated on the High Street façade with spurs. Ornamental panelling, the most expensive and highest status type of timber framing, was very fashionable in the Elizabethan period. The ground floor of the Castle Street side was originally close studded with a middle rail, another expensive type of framing; this was still present in around 1883, but has since been replaced. 46 High Street is one of two houses built after the fire which originally used both decorative panels and close studding, the other being 3 Church Lane. Both types of framing are also used together on the earlier Churche's Mansion and Sweetbriar Hall.

The windows are mullioned and transomed, with originally eight or ten lights. The mullions and transoms are in wood and have ovolo mouldings with narrow fillets. Two eight-light windows are believed to date from the 17th century. The High Street bays have modern shop windows to the ground floor. The visible beams are ovolo moulded and feature brattishing, a form of decorative cresting. There is a slate roof, although like the other rebuilt merchants' houses on the High Street, number 46 probably originally had a tiled rather than thatched roof, a sign of wealth that was also an effective protection against the fires that destroyed parts of Hospital Street and Welsh Row in the 17th century. The timber frame uses soffit tenons with diminished haunch, a particularly high-quality type of carpentry joint invented early in the 16th century.

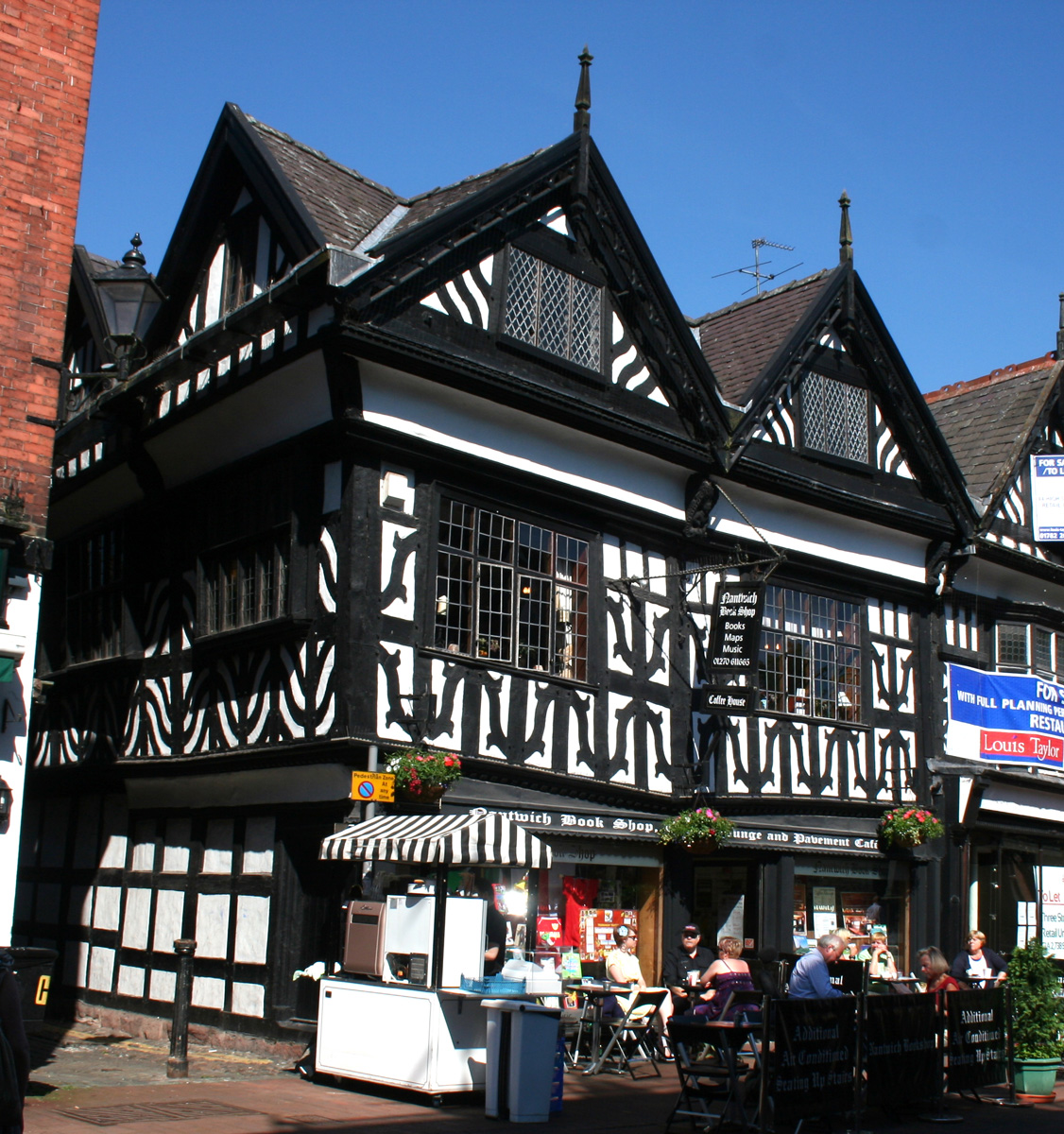
Modern building, with pavement café

Number 46 is unusual among the merchant's houses in the town centre in being two bays wide; most similar houses originally had only a single bay. The original house probably incorporated a shop on the ground floor. In the original plan, the two principal chambers would have been on the first floor. One of the first-floor rooms, now used as a café, is a good example of a living chamber with decoration dating from the early 17th century. The walls have full-height oak panelling topped with an Ionic frieze, and the ceiling has decorative plasterwork in the intervening spaces between the beams, featuring strapwork and fretting.

== Modern building ==
As of 2022, the building is an independent bookshop and coffee shop. It was featured as one of The Independent's top fifty bookshops in the UK in 2012. The modern High Street still contains many other good examples of Elizabethan timber-framed buildings, all of which date from after the fire; these include the Queen's Aid House, which stands opposite number 46, and the grade-I-listed Crown Inn.

== See also ==
- Listed buildings in Nantwich
