= 116 Hospital Street, Nantwich =

Townhouse in Nantwich, Cheshire, England, located on the south side of Hospital Street

Coordinates: 53.0658°N 2.5164°W

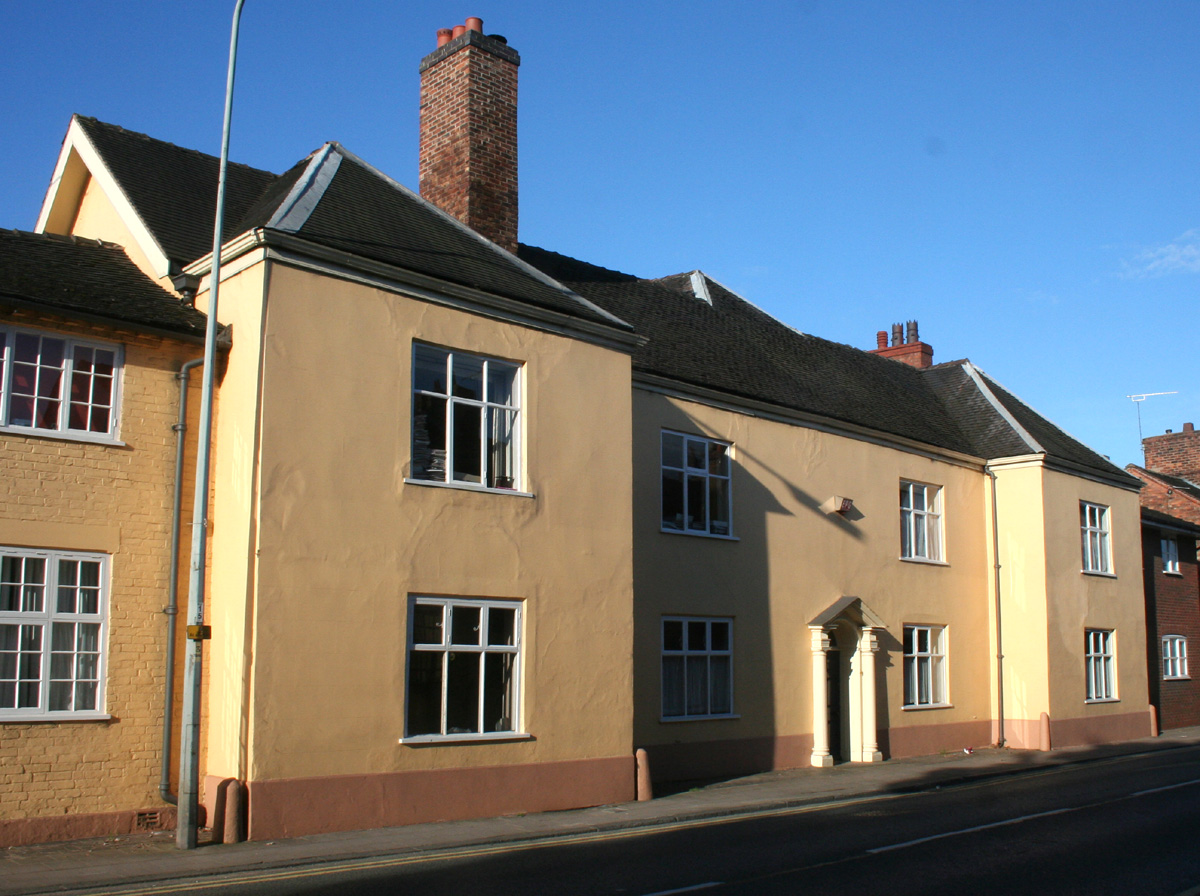
116 Hospital Street, Nantwich

116 Hospital Street (also 116 and 118 Hospital Street) is a substantial townhouse in Nantwich, Cheshire, England, located on the south side of Hospital Street (at SJ6548852178). It is listed at grade II. The present building, of Georgian appearance, incorporates an earlier timber-framed house, which probably dates in part from the 15th century. Local historian Jane Stevenson calls it "the most interesting house in Hospital Street", and considers it might be "the oldest surviving residence in Nantwich."

Number 116 is one of a group of houses dating originally from the 15th and 16th centuries at the end of Hospital Street, which include Churche's Mansion, numbers 140–142 and The Rookery (number 125). These buildings survived the fire of 1583, which destroyed the town end of Hospital Street together with much of the centre of Nantwich. Number 116 is believed to stand near the site of the medieval Hospital of St Nicholas, which gives Hospital Street its name.

== Description ==
Number 116 is a large two-storey building with painted cement rendering under a tiled roof. The Hospital Street façade has two shallow projecting end wings with hip ends projecting from the main roof. The central entrance is flanked by wooden columns and has a semicircular fanlight with a pediment above. There are four casement windows to both ground and first floors, which date from the late 19th century. When the building was listed in 1974, there was an additional doorway in the left-hand (east) wing, which was blocked in the early 21st century. The façade is of Georgian appearance; English Heritage dates it as early 18th century although "much altered", while local historian Jeremy Lake considers it to be late Georgian.

The existing building incorporates a much earlier timber-framed structure on a medieval plan, with a central hall and flanking wings. The parlour wing has been dated by Lake as probably late 15th century. This date would place it among the earliest remaining buildings in Nantwich, apart from the 14th-century parish church, and Stevenson considers it might be the oldest residential building in the town. The hall and service block, which date from the mid-to-late 17th century, probably replace earlier structures.

The interior of the parlour wing contains old chimneys and sandstone fireplaces of 15th-century design. The fireplace in the south chamber of the parlour wing is particularly fine, according to Lake. There is an intact roof truss, and the main roof timbers meet vertically underneath the roof purlin, which Lake considers characteristic of Cheshire timber framing of the 15th century. Traces of internal decoration survive, with red ochre on the roof timbers contrasting with white limewash on the wattle and daub panels of the roof truss.

== See also ==
- Listed buildings in Nantwich
