= Queen's Aid House =

House in Nantwich, Cheshire, England

Coordinates: 53.0668°N 2.5219°W

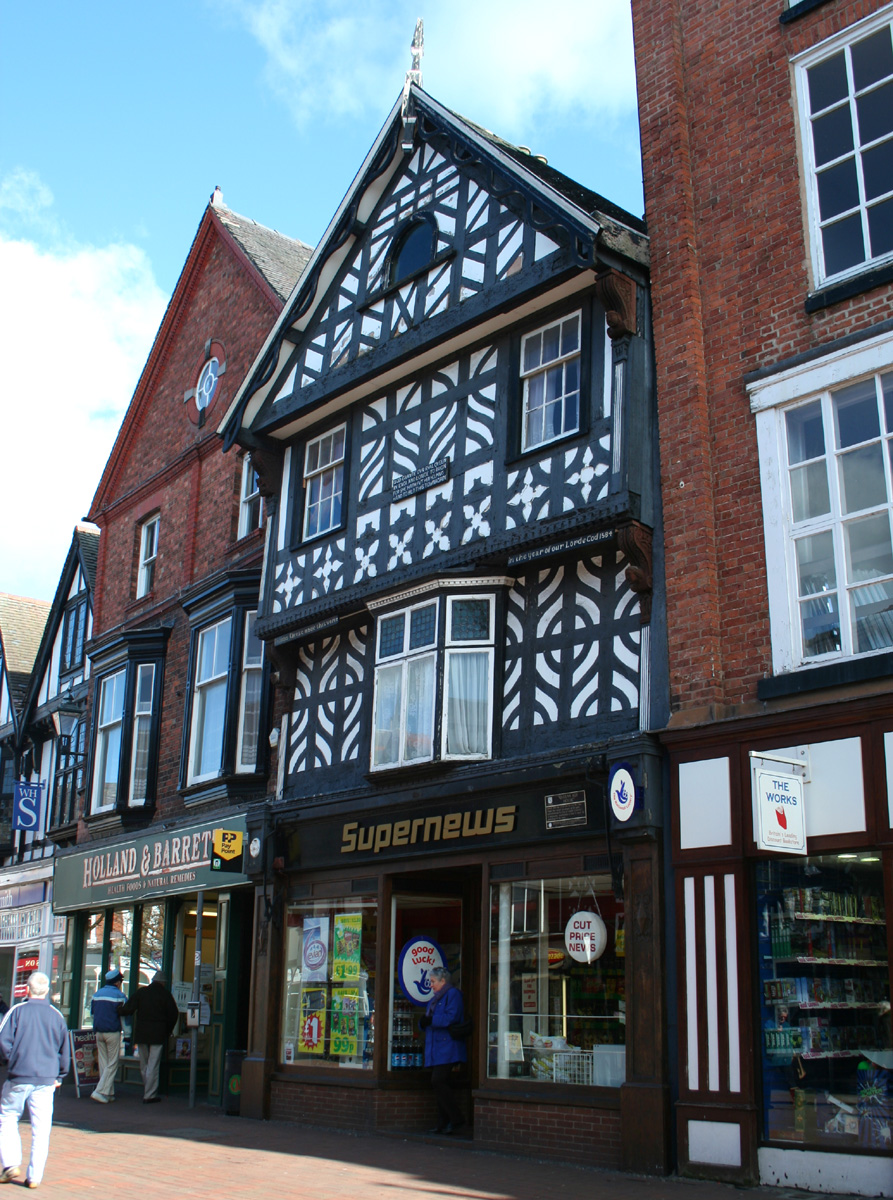
Queen's Aid House, 41 High Street, Nantwich

The Queen's Aid House, or 41 High Street, is a timber-framed, black-and-white Elizabethan merchant's house in Nantwich, Cheshire, England. It is on the High Street immediately off the town square and opposite the junction with Castle Street (at SJ6512752298). It is listed at grade II. Built shortly after the fire of 1583 by Thomas Cleese, a local craftsman, it has three storeys with attics, and features ornamental panelling, overhangs or jetties at each storey, and a 19th-century oriel window. The building is best known for its contemporary inscription commemorating Elizabeth I's aid in rebuilding the town, which gives the building its name. It has been used as a café, as well as various types of shop.

The High Street was the home of the wealthiest townspeople in the 1580s, and the houses dating from the rebuilding form the finest examples of post-fire architecture in the town. The modern High Street still contains many other good examples of Elizabethan timber-framed buildings, all of which date from after the fire; these include the grade-II*-listed number 46, which stands opposite the Queen's Aid House, and the grade-I-listed Crown Inn.

== History ==
In December 1583, a fire destroyed most of Nantwich to the east of the River Weaver. According to the contemporary account of Richard Wilbraham, 150 houses burned down, and the devastation was such that a national relief fund was organised to help pay for the town's rebuilding. The appeal was successful: "every person damaged in the loss of their houses have been holpen and relieved in some portion". Elizabeth I personally contributed – the only time that she is known to have done so – giving £1000 (around £200,000 today).

The Queen's Aid House was built as a merchant's house shortly after the fire by local craftsman Thomas Cleese. Cleese (also known as Clease or Clowes) appears to have been the town's master builder from around 1550 until after the fire. He is also known to have built Churche's Mansion, a grade-I-listed Elizabethan mansion at the end of Hospital Street, as well as the roofs to the north and south transepts of St Mary's Church. The building bears a signed inscription dated 1584, and the house is likely to have been completed that year. The original owner is unknown. Based on the signature to the inscription, it has been suggested that Cleese built the house for himself; before the fire, however, he was recorded as a tenant in Pepper Street. In the original layout, there would have been a shop on the ground floor facing the street, with a hall behind giving access to a buttery and kitchen.

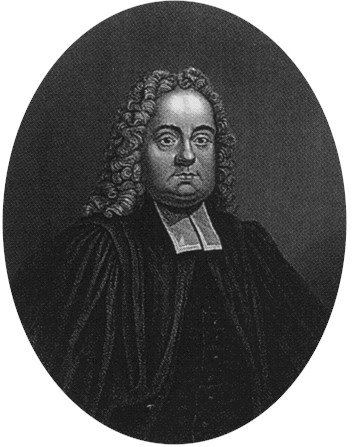
Matthew Henry

The well-known Nonconformist preacher Matthew Henry died of apoplexy in the house on 22 June 1714, after visiting the town to preach at the Presbyterian Meeting House on Pepper Street. He was staying with the Reverend Joseph Mottershead, the minister of the Meeting House.

When local historian James Hall wrote in the 1880s, the Queen's Aid House had been a grocer's shop for at least a century, and had then been occupied by William Sandford since at least 1874. On 16 November 1882, it survived a fire that destroyed its neighbour, a draper's shop. It remained a grocer's shop run by Wardle & Hughes and later Arthur Bentley until at least 1914. In the 1910s and 1920s it was the Queen Bess Café, which appears in a Nantwich postcard, but by 1939 had returned to being a grocer's, the Star Tea Company. In the 1980s it sold confectionery and tobacco products. The building was restored in 2010. As of 2010, it is one of the Rippleglen chain of newsagent's shops.

== Description ==
The Queen's Aid House is a tall black-and-white building of three storeys plus attics under a tiled roof, with a timber frame infilled with plaster. Each floor is jettied; the corbels supporting the overhangs are carved with faces and other motifs. In common with most merchant's houses of this date in Nantwich, its single gable faces the street, with all the accommodation fitting into a single bay's width. The gable is topped with a finial.

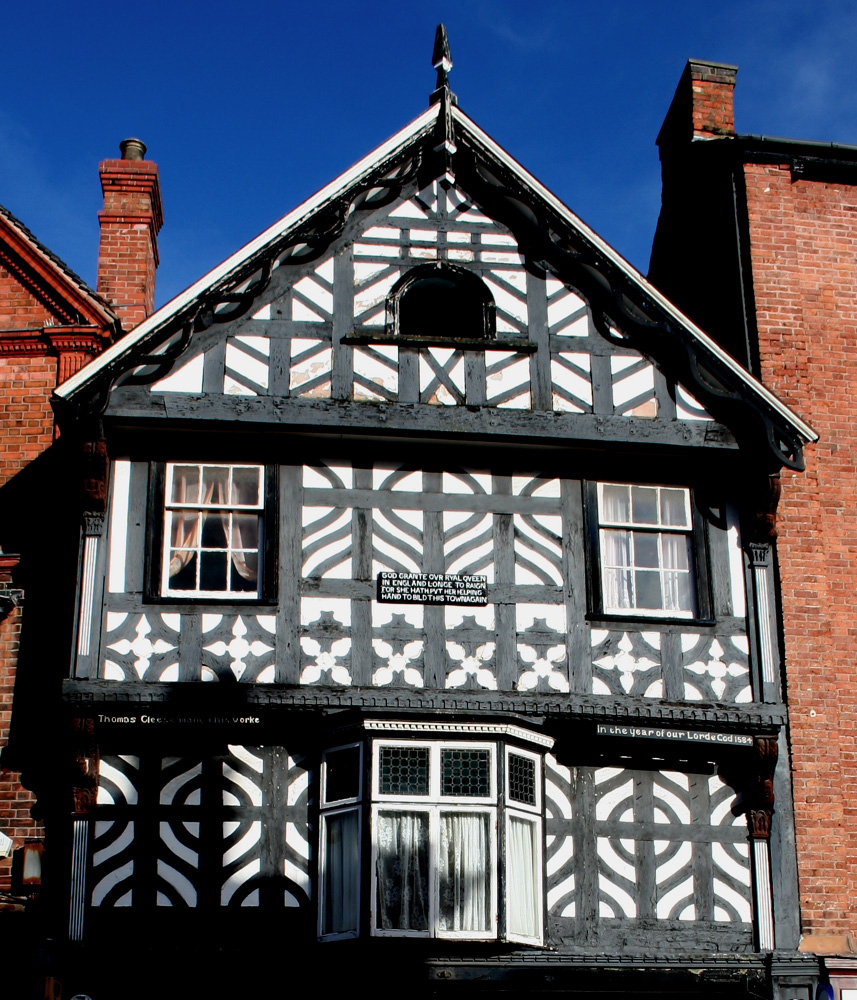
Detail showing upper storeys

There is ornamental panelling to all storeys except the ground floor, which has a modern shop front. Motifs include ogee lozenges, similar to the decoration of Churche's Mansion, as well as quatrefoils and herringbone patterns. The first storey is flanked by a pair of fluted pilasters, which are in early Renaissance style. None of the windows is original. The first storey has a canted oriel window dating from the 19th century; the second storey has two sash windows, and the attic storey has a single small window with a semicircular arched head. On the second storey, between the two windows, is a carved wooden plaque, which commemorates the aid given by the queen in rebuilding the town:

God Grante Our R[o]yal Queen
In England Longe To Raign
For She Hath Put Her Helping
Hand To Bild This Towne Again

A second carved inscription, in two panels under the second-storey jetty, reads:

Thomas Cleese Made This Worke
The Yeare of Our Lorde God. 1584

On the interior, the ground-floor room facing the street has beams with ovolo moulding.

== See also ==
- Listed buildings in Nantwich
