= Combermere =

Combermere can refer to:

- Combermere Abbey, Cheshire, England
- Combermere Park, Cheshire, England
- Combermere, Cheshire, a village in Cheshire, England
- Combermere House, Nantwich, a listed building in Nantwich, Cheshire
- Comber Mere, a lake in the park of Combermere Abbey, Cheshire, England
- Combermere, Ontario, a town in eastern Ontario, Canada
- Combermere School, Barbados
- Combermere Barracks, a British Army barracks near Windsor Castle
- Viscount Combermere, a title in the Peerage of the United Kingdom
