= Churche's Mansion =

Grade I listed mansion in Cheshire, England

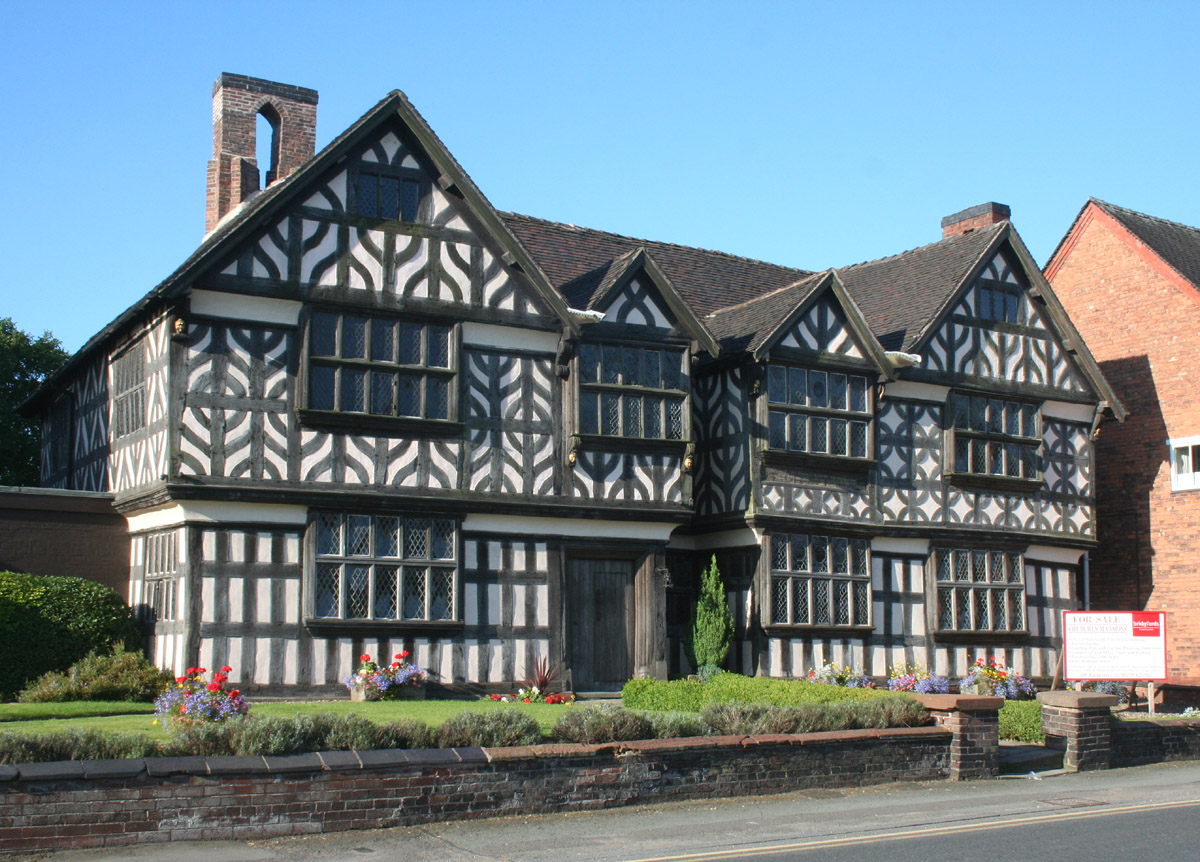
- Churche's Mansion in 2007

Location map and quick summary
Location in Cheshire
53°03′56″N 2°30′52″W
Location	Nantwich, Cheshire, England
History
Built	1577
Built for	Richard Churche
Site notes
Architectural style	Elizabethan
Listed Building – Grade I
Designated	19 April 1948
Reference no.	1039605

Churche's Mansion is a timber-framed, black-and-white Elizabethan mansion house at the eastern end of Hospital Street in Nantwich, Cheshire, England. The Grade I listed building dates from 1577, and is one of the few to have survived the Great Fire of Nantwich in 1583. Built by Thomas Clease for Richard Churche, a wealthy Nantwich merchant, and his wife, it remained in their family until the 20th century. In the early 1930s, it was rescued from being shipped to the United States by Edgar and Irene Myott, who restored the building. As well as a dwelling, the mansion has been used as a school, restaurant, antiques shop, and granary and hay store.

The building has an H-shaped plan with four gables to the front; the upper storey and the attics all overhang with jetties. The upper storeys feature decorative panels over close studding to the ground floor, and the exterior has many gilded carvings. The mullioned-and-transomed windows have leaded lights, a few of which are original. On the interior, the principal rooms have oak panelling, some of which is Elizabethan in date, with two fine overmantels; there is also a coffin drop. The architectural historian Nikolaus Pevsner considered Churche's Mansion to be among the best timber-framed Elizabethan buildings in Cheshire, describing it as "an outstanding piece of decorated half-timber architecture."

== History ==
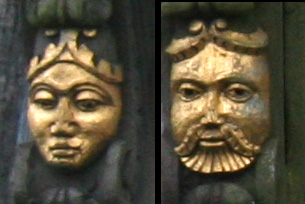
Carved heads of the Churches

Churche's Mansion was built for Richard Churche and his wife Margerye by Thomas Clease in 1577. A panel under a window to the right of the main entrance bears the inscription:

Rychard Churche, and Margerye Churche, his wyfe mai iiii

Thomas Clease made this worke, anno dni, M, ccccc, lxxvii,

in the xviiii yere of the reane of our noble queene elesabeth

The other remaining building signed by the craftsman Thomas Clease (also Cleese and Clayes) is the Queen's Aid House on Nantwich High Street, known for its inscription thanking Elizabeth I for her aid in the town's rebuilding after the Great Fire; he is also recorded as replacing roof timbers in St Mary's Church.

The land in "Hospitull Strete" on which the mansion was built had been granted to John and Nicolas Churchehouse of Grayste (Gresty) in 1474/75 by John Marchomley and his son John, Richard and William Cholmondeley, and John Bromley. By the late 16th century, the Churche family (known variously as Church, Chirche, Kyrke and Churchehouse) was a prominent one in Nantwich. Richard Churche (1540–92) was a wealthy merchant who owned a Nantwich salt house with six leads, tanning pits, part of a corn mill and possibly a glassworks, as well as considerable property and land holdings in Nantwich, across Cheshire, and in Shropshire and Stafford. His wife, Margerye or Margaret Churche, daughter of Roger Wright, came from another significant Nantwich family; she survived her husband, living until 1599.

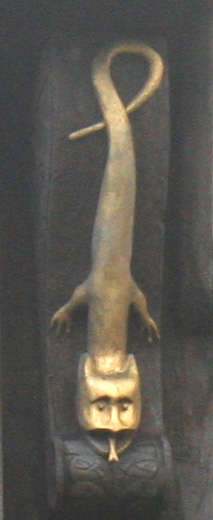
Carved salamander, a traditional protection against fire

Standing on the edge of the old town, the recently completed Churche's Mansion survived the fire of 1583 which destroyed most of Nantwich east of the River Weaver, including the western end of Hospital Street up to Sweetbriar Hall. Richard Churche willed "the house ... wherein I now dwell on the Ospell Street" to his second son, Rondull, Randol or Randle Church(e). The house is mentioned among the five principal houses of the town in a 1622/23 account by William Webb, who describes the mansion as "a fair timber-house of Mr. Randol Church, a gentleman of singular integrity"; it remained on the edge of the town at that date. (Note: The earliest known map of Nantwich, dated 1794, shows only sparse building to the east of Churche's Mansion; Wright's Almshouses were built at the junction of Hospital Street with London Road in 1638.) Randle Church survived until 1648, outliving his son and grandson, and Churche's Mansion then passed to the Shropshire branch of the family, descended from Richard Churche's eldest son, William. The Churche family inhabited the house until at least 1691, when a rate book records Saboth Church as the resident and gives the rates as 2 shillings 8½ pence.

Although Saboth Church (also Sabbath or Sabboth) was the last Churche family member to live in the mansion (he died in 1717), it remained in the family's possession until the 20th century, with a succession of tenants. In the early 19th century, the mansion was tenanted by a tanner and later by an attorney-at-law. In 1858–68, it was untenanted, and was used as a granary and hay store by a local cowkeeper. From 1869 until at least 1883, it housed the ladies' boarding and day school of Mrs E. H. Rhodes. Relatively little significant alteration was carried out, which the historian R. N. Dore attributes to the house being occupied by tenants.

The mansion later fell into disrepair, and in 1930 or 1931, it was saved from dismantling to ship to the United States by Edgar and Irene Myott, who purchased the building and carried out well-regarded (Note: For example, Historic England, the architectural historian Marcus Binney, the architecture writer Robin Fedden and the local historian Joan Beck.) restoration work over the following two decades. It was listed at Grade I, the highest grade, on 19 April 1948. Restoration was still ongoing in 1953, when major repairs were carried out at the rear – where the damage to the timberwork had been greatest – reusing timbers from other sites; in honour of the coronation, one of the corbels was carved to depict Elizabeth II's head. At the same time, Georgian casements were replaced by replicas based on the surviving original windows, and another stained-glass window was added in 1977.

During much of the second half of the 20th century the building was used as a restaurant, and drew praise in the 1956/57 edition of Raymond Postgate's The Good Food Guide, for example, where its entry notes that dinner was served by candlelight and the menu included regional specialities. It was an antiques shop from 2000, and from 2019 a fish restaurant; in 2023 it was put up for sale. In 2007 the mansion was featured on Most Haunted: Midsummer Murders.

== Location ==
Churche's Mansion stands at SJ6562752150, near the eastern end of the modern Hospital Street, on the south side, opposite the junction with Millstone Lane. It is adjacent to Combermere House (number 148) and opposite The Rookery, with number 140–142 being nearby.

== Description ==
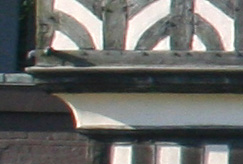
Plaster coving over floor joists

The mansion house follows an H-shaped, late-medieval or Tudor plan with a central hall and cross wings, like a small country house; Pevsner considered it to resemble the nearby Dorfold Hall, which is slightly later in date. The front is around 34 ft (10 m) long and the east side 20 ft (6 m). It has four gables to the front – two large outer and two smaller inner – and a two-gabled wing to the eastern (left-hand) side. The roof is tiled, with two prominent brick chimney stacks. There are two storeys with an attic, with both the first and second floors on two sides overhanging the floor beneath to form jetties, a typical feature of timber-framed town houses of this date. The protruding floor joists are concealed by plaster coving built up over shaped brackets and laths, in a fashion described by Pevsner as a "speciality of Cheshire". The asymmetrically positioned main entrance is on the east (left) wing, and has a porch. To the rear, opposite the porch, rises a square stair tower.

The upper storeys of the front face have ornamental panels featuring several different decorative motifs, including roundels and diagonal ogee braces; the side has timbering with a simpler herringbone or chevron pattern. The ground floor in both cases has close studding with two horizontal rails; the combination of ornamental panels with close studding is rare in Nantwich. The decorative treatment is not symmetrical across the front. Undecorated square framing is employed at the rear. The eaves have corbel brackets with carvings including human faces and animals. On the front face these include an ape; a devil; a lion, symbolising Christ; and a salamander, supposed to give protection against fire. Gilded carvings believed to depict Richard and Margerye Churche are located above the main entrance, on either side. The highly decorated style is typical of the timber-framed buildings of the Elizabethan period, although the timber-framing specialist Richard Harris considers Churche's Mansion to be "slightly less exuberantly decorated" than most of the 15th- and 16th-century mansion houses in the region with ornate timbering, such as Little Moreton Hall and Rufford Old Hall. The oak timbers were never blackened with pitch or tar, and bear carpenters' marks with both Arabic numerals and (on the interior) Roman numerals, some being unusually long. The wattle of the infill panels had its bark stripped off, unlike most other houses in the town.

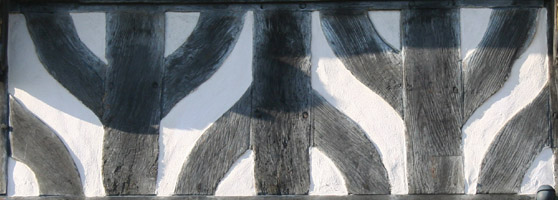
Ogee design on decorative panels

The windows are predominantly mullioned and transomed in wood, with three to five leaded lights, some containing stained glass. The Hospital Street front has four windows to the ground floor and five to the first floor (four main and a small recessed one); the rear face has three windows to the ground floor with four to the upper storey, including one to the west face of the stair tower. The east (left) face has a single window to the ground floor with two to the upper storey; the west face has a similar pattern. At the attic level there are also windows at each end. The chapel window above the porch is original; its leading has a hexagonal pattern. Another Elizabethan leaded window was discovered during the Myotts' restoration. Two windows have inscriptions beneath them: one inscription gives the date of construction and is quoted previously; the other states "The roote of Wysedom is to Feare God, & the branch thereof shall too endure."

=== Interior ===
The house is laid out around a central hall connecting the mansion's two wings. The hall – which the architectural historian Ronald Brunskill characterises as "vestigial" – lacks both a screens passage and any fireplace; one part has a raised floor. Dore considers the hall would have been used for dining, but in the light of the unusual lack of heating, other uses have been suggested, including a passageway and a showroom for Richard Churche's business. The other major rooms on the ground floor are the parlour or withdrawing room to the right of the hall (originally divided into two), and the service rooms (the kitchen and possibly a buttery or an office) to the left; there is also a small entrance porch at the main Hospital Street entrance. Off the hall is a spiral staircase between storeys. The entrance porch has a panelled ceiling with inlaid decoration and a moulded doorcase with an 18th-century oak door. The kitchen contains a very large brick inglenook fireplace, which has been partially or completely rebuilt. Some of the rooms have exposed beams, especially in the service wing, including diagonal dragon beams in the corners supporting the jetties.

The first floor has five main rooms: the upper hall or great chamber (which was never open to the roof, and like the hall below, was unheated) and four private upper rooms, some of which would have contained beds, as well as a small chapel. The oak floorboards on the first floor are original; they are 2 ft (0.6 m) wide and separated by narrow strips. In the upper hall is a coffin drop, an opening in the floor covered with jointed boards and with a removable joist, allowing the lowering of large items that would otherwise be difficult to manipulate on the narrow spiral staircase. Traditionally used for coffins, the coffin drop would also facilitate the movement of large pieces of furniture. The attic is now divided into five rooms and probably provided servants' accommodation. The roof has tie-beam trusses.

The principal rooms on both ground and first floors have full-height oak panelling; that in several rooms is Elizabethan, including the upper rear room over the service wing. This room, believed to be Richard and Margerye's chamber, has a fine carved overmantel featuring a central square panel with interwoven initials "RMC" forming a love knot, which is flanked by arched panels; this room also has a small closet. The ground-floor parlour contains another good example of a carved overmantel, with five arched panels divided by fluted pilasters, each topped by a floral motif; the whole fireplace is flanked by non-identical fluted pilasters. One of the rooms has panels decorated with intersecting triangles. Some of the internal doors are flanked by fluted pilasters, and others have decorated drum-shaped bases. Formerly on display in the central hall was an elaborately carved Elizabethan cupboard or press, believed to form part of the mansion's original furniture, which was purchased by the Myotts in 1952 from Betton Hall in Shropshire (where Richard Churche had property); it bears the Churches' initials and crest, as well as carved heads believed to represent the couple, and the arms of Elizabeth I. Elements in the panelling and overmantels match the ornamentation on this press.

=== Grounds and outbuildings ===
Churche's Mansion was constructed on the edge of Nantwich, and in the 16th century would have been surrounded by farmland. The building was originally moated, and traces of the moat remained in the late 19th century. The transfer deed of 1474/75 mentions that the plot had gardens and orchards, while Richard Churche's will of 1592 describes the property as having "gardens meadowe dovehouse stable & buyldings" and an orchard is also mentioned in the 1691 rate book. An Elizabethan well was discovered during renovation work.

The 21st-century house has a small formal garden facing Hospital Street, and a large walled garden at the rear with lawns and fruit and nut trees.

== Modern reception ==
Pevsner considered Churche's Mansion to be among the best timber-framed Elizabethan buildings in Cheshire, describing it as "an outstanding piece of decorated half-timber architecture." Historic England characterise it as an "important" 16th-century house. The architectural historians Peter de Figueiredo and Julian Treuherz describe the mansion as an "unusually well preserved" example of its kind. Binney calls it "one of the most complete timber-framed houses in England", considering that the jettying and the way in which the different-sized gables of the front "jostle against each other" contribute to the building's "picturesque appeal". The architectural historians Clare Hartwell and Matthew Hyde consider the use of different decorative treatments across the front to "undermin[e] the symmetrical effect".

== See also ==
- Grade I listed buildings in Cheshire
- Listed buildings in Nantwich
- 46 High Street, Nantwich, built for another member of the Churche family

== References and notes ==
Sources

- Beck, J. Tudor Cheshire, A History of Cheshire Vol. 7 (J. J. Bagley, ed.) (Cheshire Community Council; 1969)
- Bilsborough, N. The Treasures of Cheshire (Environmental Institute; 1983) (ISBN 0-901347-35-3)
- Brunskill, R. W. Timber Building in Britain (Gollancz; 1985) (ISBN 978-0575033795)
- Cunnington, P. How Old is Your House? (Marston House; 1999) (ISBN 978-1899296088)
- Fedden, R., Kenworthy-Brown, J. The Country House Guide (Jonathan Cape; 1979) (ISBN 978-0224013598)
- de Figueiredo P., Treuherz J. Cheshire Country Houses (Phillimore; 1988) (ISBN 0-85033-655-4)
- Dore, R. N. Cheshire (BT Batsford; 1977) (ISBN 0-7134-3187-3)
- Hall, J. A History of the Town and Parish of Nantwich, or Wich Malbank, in the County Palatine of Chester (1883)
- Harris, R. Discovering Timber-framed Buildings (Shire Publications; 2003) (ISBN 0-7478-0215-7)
- Hartwell C., Hyde, M., Hubbard, E., Pevsner, N. The Buildings of England: Cheshire (Yale University Press; 2011) (ISBN 978-0-300-17043-6)
- Lake, J. The Great Fire of Nantwich (Shiva Publishing; 1983) (ISBN 0-906812-57-7)
- McKenna, L. Timber Framed Buildings in Cheshire (Cheshire County Council; 1994) (ISBN 0-906765-16-1)
- Pevsner, N., Hubbard, E. The Buildings of England: Cheshire (Penguin Books; 1971) (ISBN 0-14-071042-6)
- Postgate, R. Good Food Guide, 1957–1958 (Cassell; 1958)

== Further reading and external link ==
- Myott, E. C. (1951) "The Homes of Cheshire. 20: Churche's Mansion, Nantwich" Cheshire Life Feb p. 21 (part 1), Mar p. 18–19 (part 2), Apr p. 18–19 (part 3)
- Nantwich. Churches Mansions 1451. Photographed by William Blake. Photograph in the early 20th century showing the Georgian casements (from The Potteries Museum & Art Gallery)
