= 140–142 Hospital Street, Nantwich =

Grade II listed building in the United kingdom

Coordinates: 53.0656°N 2.5153°W

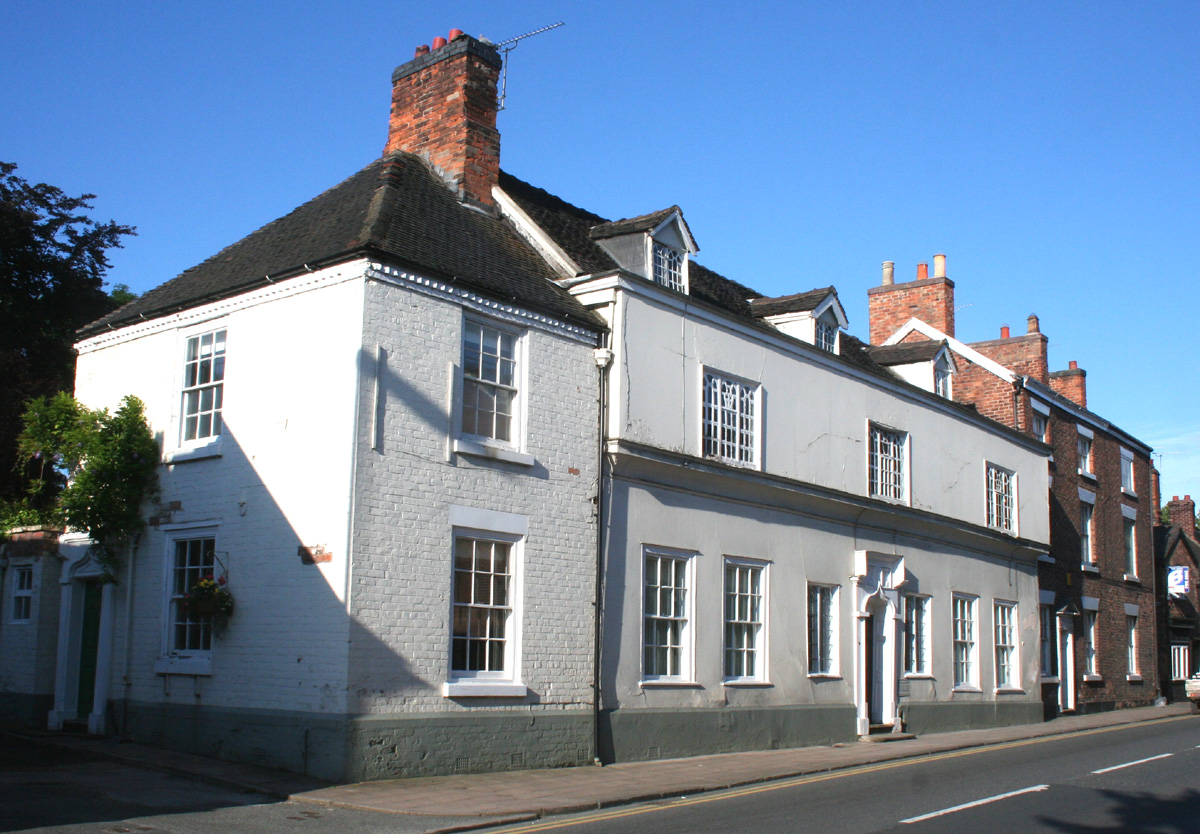
140–142 Hospital Street, Nantwich

140–142 Hospital Street, sometimes known as Hospital House, is a substantial townhouse in Nantwich, Cheshire, England, located on the south side of Hospital Street (at SJ6557452166). The building is listed at grade II. It was built in the late 16th century by John Crewe, a tanner, whose sons Randolph and Thomas both served as the Speaker of the House of Commons. The original timber-framed, close-studded façade has been concealed by alterations during the late 17th century; these include the addition of small-paned casement windows, some of which contain old heraldic stained glass. The building was further altered and extended in the 18th century, with the addition of two Gothic-style entrances. Later occupants include the architect, Thomas Bower, and the building remains in residential use.

The present building is believed to stand on the site of the medieval Hospital of St Nicholas, which gives Hospital Street its name. Stone remains discovered in the garden have been associated with the hospital.

== Hospital of St Nicholas ==
Historian James Hall tentatively identifies the existing building as standing on the site of the medieval Hospital of St Nicholas, which was established at the end of Hospital Street and gives the street its name. Founded by William Malbank, the first baron of Nantwich, in 1083–84, the hospice was a religious house which accommodated sick or infirm travellers and gave alms to the poor. It was dissolved in 1548; on 11 November of the following year, Edward VI granted "a House and manse formerly called the Chapel of St. Nicholas", together with associated land and property, to Sir Thomas Bromley of Nantwich, a justice of the King's Bench. By 1569, Bromley had sold it to Richard Wright. The original site of the Wright's Almshouses, built in 1638, was on part of the former hospice's land.

== History of present building ==
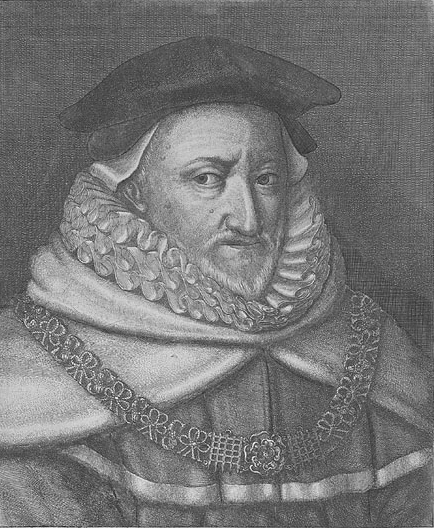
Sir Randolph Crewe

The present building dates originally from the late 16th century, and was built by John Crewe (c. 1524–98), who is said to have been a tanner. The Crewes claimed descent from the de Crewe family, who owned the manor of Crewe (now Crewe Green) in the 13th century. John Crewe married Alice Mainwaring, daughter of Hugh or Humphrey Mainwaring, and the house was probably built after their marriage. The Mainwarings were one of the prominent gentry families in Nantwich, having owned land there since the 14th century, and were also involved in the salt-making industry. John Crewe was the landlord of the property on Waterlode where the 1583 fire started "through negligence of undiscreet persons brewing", which destroyed much of the centre of the town, but spared the end of Hospital Street. Two of the couple's sons achieved national prominence in the legal profession and parliament. Randolph Crewe became a judge, member of parliament (MP), parliamentary Speaker and, briefly, Lord Chief Justice; he made a fortune from a successful practice in chancery and other London courts, and built the Jacobean mansion, Crewe Hall, in nearby Crewe Green. Thomas Crewe also became a lawyer, MP and Speaker. John Crewe died in 1598 and was buried in Nantwich. A carved marble memorial in St Mary's Church described him as "Johannes Crewe ex antiquâ familiâ de Crewe oriundus, vir pius" ("John Crewe descended from the ancient family of Crewe, a pious man"); it was removed in 1729.

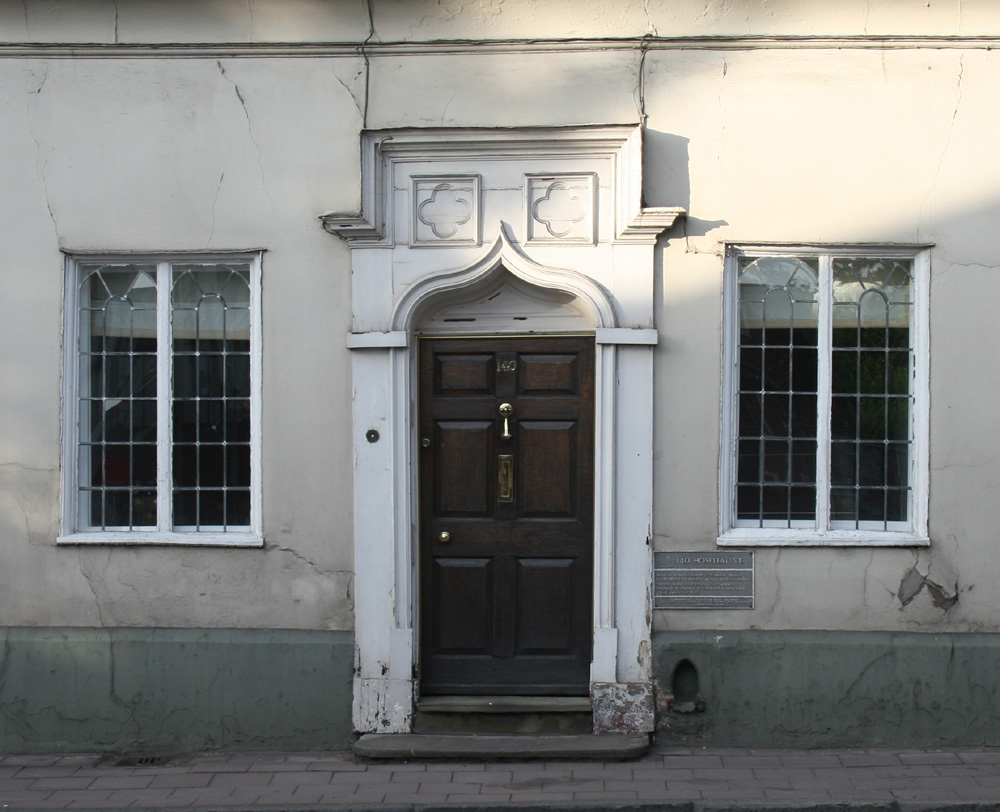
Gothic entrance and casements

In the 1650s, "y^{e} Hospitall howse" or "St Nicholas Hospitall" was owned by the Wilbraham family; it was leased in 1655 to William Jackson, a tanner. Jackson kept a tannery at the end of Hospital Street, possibly on the site now known as the "old tanyard"; this might have earlier been John Crewe's tannery. Subsequent inhabitants of the house include the Goldsmith family (early 18th century) and the Caldwell family, later of Linley Hall, Talke, Staffordshire (late 18th century). The last of the Caldwell family is identified by Hall as the Scot described in Joseph Priestley's journal: "In my congregation there was (outside of the house in which I was boarded) hardly more than one family in which I could spend a leisure hour with much satisfaction, and that was Mr. James Caldwell's, a Scotchman." In 1883, the occupier was the architect, Thomas Bower, who built offices at the east end of the house. In the course of these alterations, stone remains were discovered in the garden, which Bower identified as being part of a Norman doorway, perhaps part of the original Hospital of St Nicholas.

== Description ==
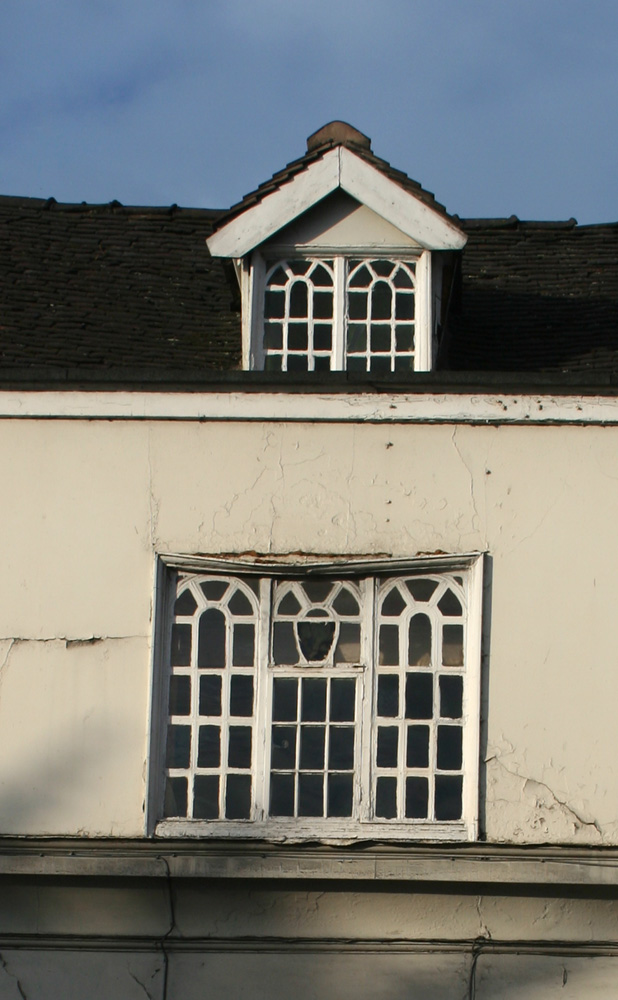
First-storey and dormer casements

140–142 Hospital Street is one of a group of houses dating from the 15th and 16th centuries at the end of Hospital Street, which include Churche's Mansion, number 116 and The Rookery (number 125). It is a timber-framed building with a predominantly rendered finish under a tiled roof. It has three bays to the main front face and two storeys with attics. An 18th-century extension on the east (left) side is in painted brick and faces onto a passageway; the rear of the building also dates from the 18th century. The upper storey overhangs to form a continuous jetty along the front façade. A common urban design, this was an unusual layout for a Nantwich mansion; other examples had a central hall with flanking wings as, for example, at Churche's Mansion, a few houses up the street. The Hospital Street face was originally close studded, that is, decorated with closely spaced upright timbers, as at the Crown Hotel on the High Street. The timbering was covered in the late 17th century, giving the building its current 17th-century appearance.

The main entrance, in the Gothic style, dates from the late 18th century. Stone steps lead to the door, which is headed by an ogee-arched moulding, with paired quatrefoil decorations above surmounted by a cornice. Nikolaus Pevsner describes the entrance as "pretty". This entrance is flanked by 17th-century casement windows; there are three casement windows on the first floor and three gabled dormer windows with casements, dating from the late 17th century. All the casements have a lattice of small panes, headed by a circular pattern. The three first-floor casements contain old stained glass displaying the Crewe and Mainwaring coats of arms. The main section of the house also has four sash windows to the ground floor, dating from the late 18th century.

The 18th-century east bay has another Gothic-style entrance on the east face, which duplicates the main entrance. It has sash windows to the ground and first floors, on both the Hospital Street and east faces.

== See also ==
- Listed buildings in Nantwich
