= The Rookery, Nantwich =

Townhouse in Nantwich, Cheshire, England

Coordinates: 53.0658°N 2.5150°W

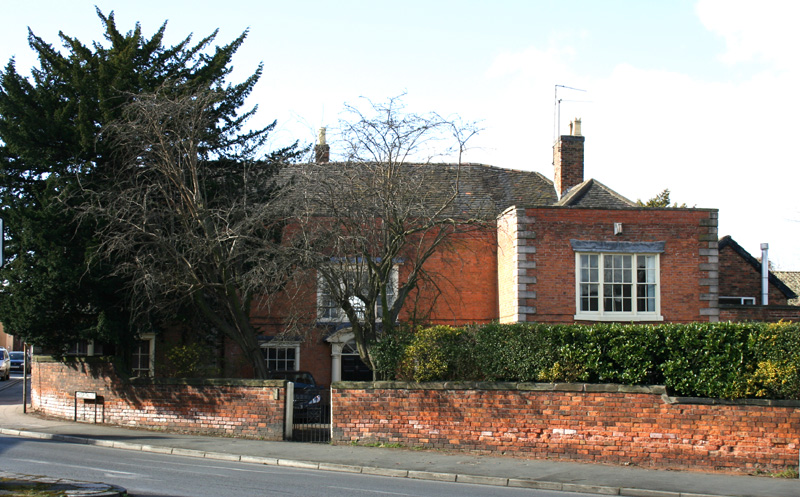
The Rookery, 125 Hospital Street, Nantwich

The Rookery, or 125 Hospital Street, is a substantial Georgian townhouse in Nantwich, Cheshire, England. It is at the end of Hospital Street, on the north side, at the junction with Millstone Lane (at SJ6558752192). The existing building dates from the mid-18th century and is listed at grade II; English Heritage describes it as "good" in the listing. Nikolaus Pevsner describes it as "square and stately." It incorporates an earlier timber-framed house at the rear, which probably dates from the late 16th or early 17th century.

The Rookery is one of a group of houses dating originally from the 15th and 16th centuries at the end of Hospital Street, which include Churche's Mansion, number 116 and numbers 140–142. These buildings survived the fire of 1583, which destroyed the town end of Hospital Street together with much of the centre of Nantwich. The Rookery is believed to stand near the site of the medieval Hospital of St Nicholas, which gives Hospital Street its name.

== Description ==
The Rookery is a large detached Georgian building of two storeys, in red brick with stone dressings under a tiled roof. The front façade faces Millstone Lane and is set well back from the street behind a brick wall. This face has two projecting end wings, with decorative stone quoins at each corner. The main central doorway is flanked by paired Roman Doric columns and has a fanlight and curved pediment above. Two large three-light sash windows to the ground floor and three similar windows to the first floor all have wooden pilasters; the main doorway is also flanked by single-light windows. On the interior, the main staircase is described as "good" by English Heritage.

The existing building incorporates an earlier timber-framed house at the rear, which probably originally had a central hall and flanking wings. Local historian Jeremy Lake has dated the roof timbers as late 16th or early 17th century.

After many years of neglect, The Rookery was acquired by a local developer in 2015, who restored the building and converted it into five apartments.

== See also ==
- Listed buildings in Nantwich
