= Hospital of St Nicholas, Nantwich =

Hospital of St Nicholas
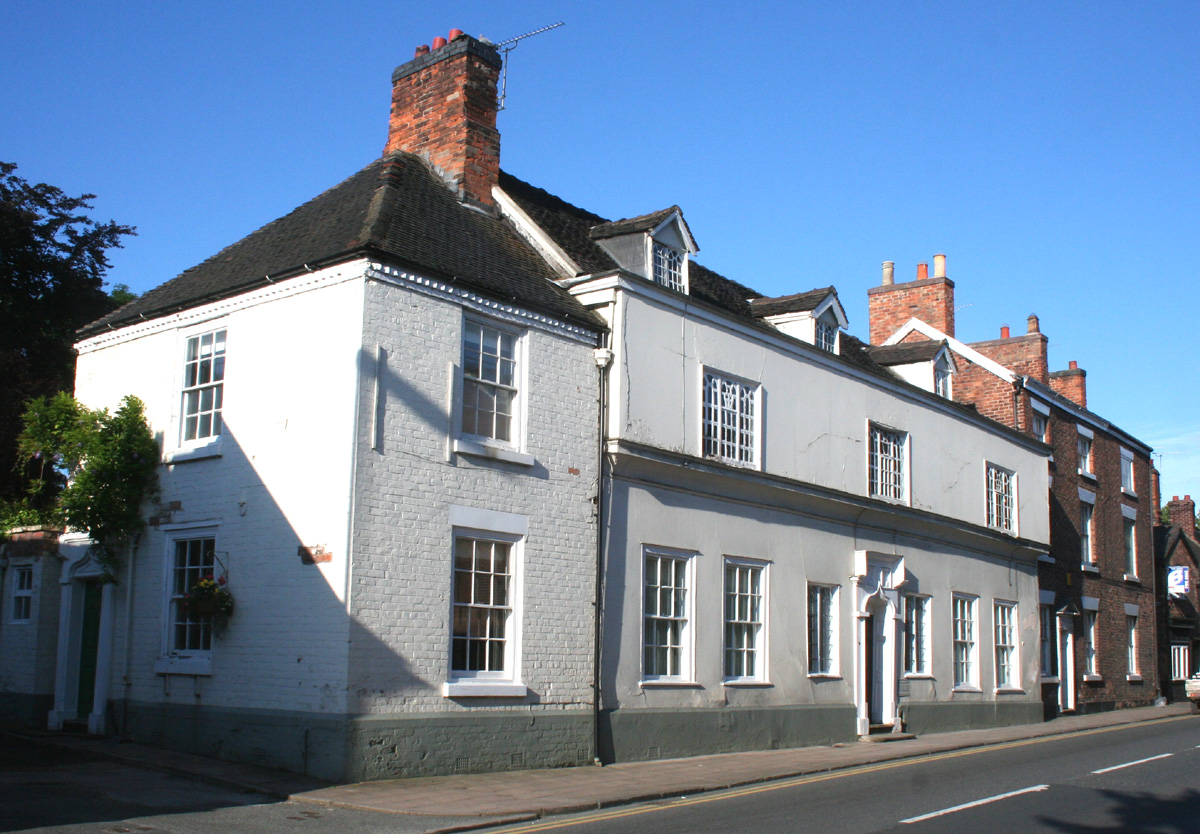
- The 16th-century 140–142 Hospital Street might stand on the hospital site

- Shown in Cheshire

Geography
- Location: Nantwich, England, United Kingdom
- Coordinates: 53.0656°N 2.5153°W

History
- Founded: 1083
- Closed: 1548

Links
- Lists: Hospitals in England

The Hospital of St Nicholas (variously known as St Nicholas Hospital, the Hospice of St Nicholas and the free Chapel and Hospice of St Nicholas) was a medieval hospital for travellers, which gave its name to Hospital Street in the English town of Nantwich in Cheshire. Founded in 1083–84 by William Malbank, first baron of Nantwich, it was dissolved in 1548 and probably later demolished.

== History ==
The Hospital of St Nicholas was founded by William Malbank, the first baron of Nantwich, in 1083–84, the eighteenth year of the reign of William I. His post mortem inquisition states:

William Maubank formerly Lord and Baron of Nantwich died seized of the site of St. Nicholas Hospital in Nantwich, a Hall, and 2 salt-pits with all the lands and perquisites belonging to the said Hospital. These were granted by him to God and to St. Nicholas of the said Hospital in pure and perpetual alms to support a certain priest celebrating Divine service in the said Hospital for ever.

It was established at the east end of the town's single street, which subsequently became known as "the high street of the hospital", the modern Hospital Street. The site might have belonged to the Hospital of St John of Jerusalem.

The hospital was a religious house which accommodated sick, infirm and destitute travellers. It had a chapel with a chaplain to minister to the spiritual welfare of the occupants. It also distributed alms to the poor. The institution was financed by a mixture of tolls from travellers, tithes from the parish, rents on its lands and property, and charitable gifts. The Hospital of St Nicholas was one of two medieval hospitals in or near the town, the other being the Hospital of St Lawrence (or St Lawrence and St James) on Welsh Row, which fell within the parish of Acton. Founded as a house for lepers, the Hospital of St Lawrence became a hospital for the infirm poor in around 1348.

The earliest recorded chaplain of the Hospital of St Nicholas is Sir John in 1259. The buildings of the hospital are first mentioned in a document of 1280. After the death of the third baron of Nantwich without male issue, the advowson – the right to appoint the hospital's chaplain – passed in the female line, being acquired by the Lovell family in around 1350; from this date, the chaplains or masters are recorded in the Bishops' Registers of Lichfield.

In 1535, by order of Henry VIII, the "lands and tenements" belonging to the hospital were valued at £6 11s 4d, with additionally tithes of 13s 1¾d; the chaplain at this date was William Gwyn. The final chaplain, William Hill, succeeded Gwyn in 1541. On 3 November 1542, presumably in anticipation of the hospital's dissolution, Hill leased "all that hys ffree Chappell or Hospitall with all houses, messuages, tenements, lands, tythes, leadds salt wallings emoluments &c. thereto belonging" to Raphe Wilbraham.

== Dissolution ==
The hospital was dissolved in 1548. At this time, it was said to have no plate, jewels, goods, ornaments, lead or bells. Hill, the chaplain, was then 50 years old; he received an annual pension of £5, which continued to be paid until 1561. The lease to Wilbraham was annulled and, on 11 November 1549, Edward VI granted to Sir Thomas Bromley of Nantwich, a justice of the King's Bench:

a House and manse formerly called the Chapel of St. Nicholas in the parish of Nantwyche, with its orchard. one close adjoining containing by estimation about 2 acres, and a croft containing ... acres, and one wiche house of 12 leads; also the site or vacant land of a wiche house of 6 leads; of the total annual value of £6 11s. 4d.

Bromley also acquired the lands and property of the Chantry House of Bunbury, paying to the Crown a total of £435 16s 8d. By 1569, Bromley had sold the Nantwich property to Richard Wright. The hospital lands were leased in 1597 to Richard Wilbraham, and the Wilbraham family purchased the site in 1637. The Wilbrahams later leased the land to a tanner, who built a tannery on part of the site. The original site of the Wright's Almshouses, built in 1638 at the junction of Hospital Street and London Road, is recorded as being on part of the former hospital's land.

The fate of the hospital's buildings is unknown, but they were probably demolished soon after the dissolution. The Victorian historian James Hall tentatively identifies 140–142 Hospital Street, built in the late 16th century and referred to in 17th-century records as "y^{e} Hospitall howse" and "St Nicholas Hospitall", as standing on the site of the medieval hospital. Stone remains were discovered in the garden of this property during 19th-century building works, which were identified by architect Thomas Bower as being part of a Norman doorway; they perhaps originated in the hospital.
