= St Mary's Church, Nantwich =

- St Mary's Church, Nantwich, in 2026

- Location in Cheshire
- 53.0671°N 2.5206°W
- OS grid reference: SJ 651 523
- Location: Nantwich, Cheshire
- Country: England
- Denomination: Anglican
- Website: St Mary's, Nantwich

History
- Status: Parish church

Architecture
- Functional status: Active
- Heritage designation: Grade I
- Designated: 19 April 1948
- Architect: George Gilbert Scott (restoration)
- Architectural type: Church
- Style: Gothic

Specifications
- Height: 101 feet (31 m)
- Materials: Red sandstone

Administration
- Province: York
- Diocese: Chester
- Archdeaconry: Macclesfield
- Deanery: Nantwich
- Parish: Nantwich

Clergy
- Rector: Rev Dr Mark Hart

St Mary's Church is an Anglican parish church in Nantwich, Cheshire, England. The church is recorded in the National Heritage List for England as a designated Grade I listed building. It has been called the "Cathedral of South Cheshire" and it is considered by some to be one of the finest medieval churches, not only in Cheshire, but in the whole of England. The architectural writer Raymond Richards described it as "one of the great architectural treasures of Cheshire", and Alec Clifton-Taylor included it in his list of "outstanding" English parish churches.

The building dates from the 14th century, although a number of changes have since been made, particularly a substantial 19th-century restoration by Sir George Gilbert Scott. The church and its octagonal tower are built in red sandstone. Features of the church's interior include the lierne-vaulted ceiling of the choir, the carved stone canopies of the sedilia in the chancel, and the intricately carved wooden canopies over the choirstalls together with the 20 misericords at the back of the stalls. The church is an active Anglican parish church in the diocese of Chester, the archdeaconry of Macclesfield and the deanery of Nantwich.

== History ==
The first building on the site was a chapel of ease in the parish of Acton. In about 1130 both Acton church and Nantwich chapel came under control of the Cistercian abbey of Combermere. The building of the present church started in about 1340 in the Decorated style, which was the style most commonly used in English church building at that time. The masons, who came from Yorkshire, used local sandstone, probably from Eddisbury near Delamere. Building work was interrupted between 1349 and 1369, probably due to an outbreak of the Black Death plague. By the 1380s the town's prosperity had recovered and building work resumed. This phase of construction was carried out by master masons associated with Lichfield and Gloucester cathedrals, now building in the Perpendicular style. The south transept was endowed as a chantry chapel in 1405. In the late-15th or early-16th century, the south porch was added, the nave roof was raised and the clerestory windows were added. Following the dissolution of the monasteries, six chantry chapels were removed in 1548. Between 1572 and 1577 the transept ceilings were renewed, and between 1615 and 1633 the church floor was raised because of flooding, a west gallery was built, and the walls were painted white, with the addition of scriptural texts. The church was briefly used as a prison for Royalists captured at the battles of Nantwich and Preston during the English Civil War.

Between 1727 and 1777, the north and south galleries and a new west door were added, and windows were repaired. However, by 1789 the general structure of the church had deteriorated so much that it was said to be "so ruinous that the inhabitants cannot safely assemble". In the 19th century Sir George Gilbert Scott was brought in to direct a very extensive restoration. Amongst other alterations, he removed the galleries, the box pews, and many old memorials; the floor level was lowered and the transept roofs were pitched higher. Much of the eroded stone was replaced by sandstone from quarries at Runcorn, but not everyone was happy with the scale and nature of Scott's restoration. The architectural historian Nikolaus Pevsner complained about the replacement of a Decorated doorway and a Perpendicular window with corresponding structures in the style of the late-13th century. The local representative of the Society for the Protection of Ancient Buildings at the time was of the opinion that "Very great injury was done to this Church in the Restoration ...". Clifton-Taylor complained about the way in which part of the church walls have subsequently been pointed. The last major work to be carried out on the church was in 1878, under the direction of local architect Thomas Bower, when the south porch was restored at a cost of £900 (equivalent to £90,000 in 2025).

== Architecture ==
=== Exterior ===
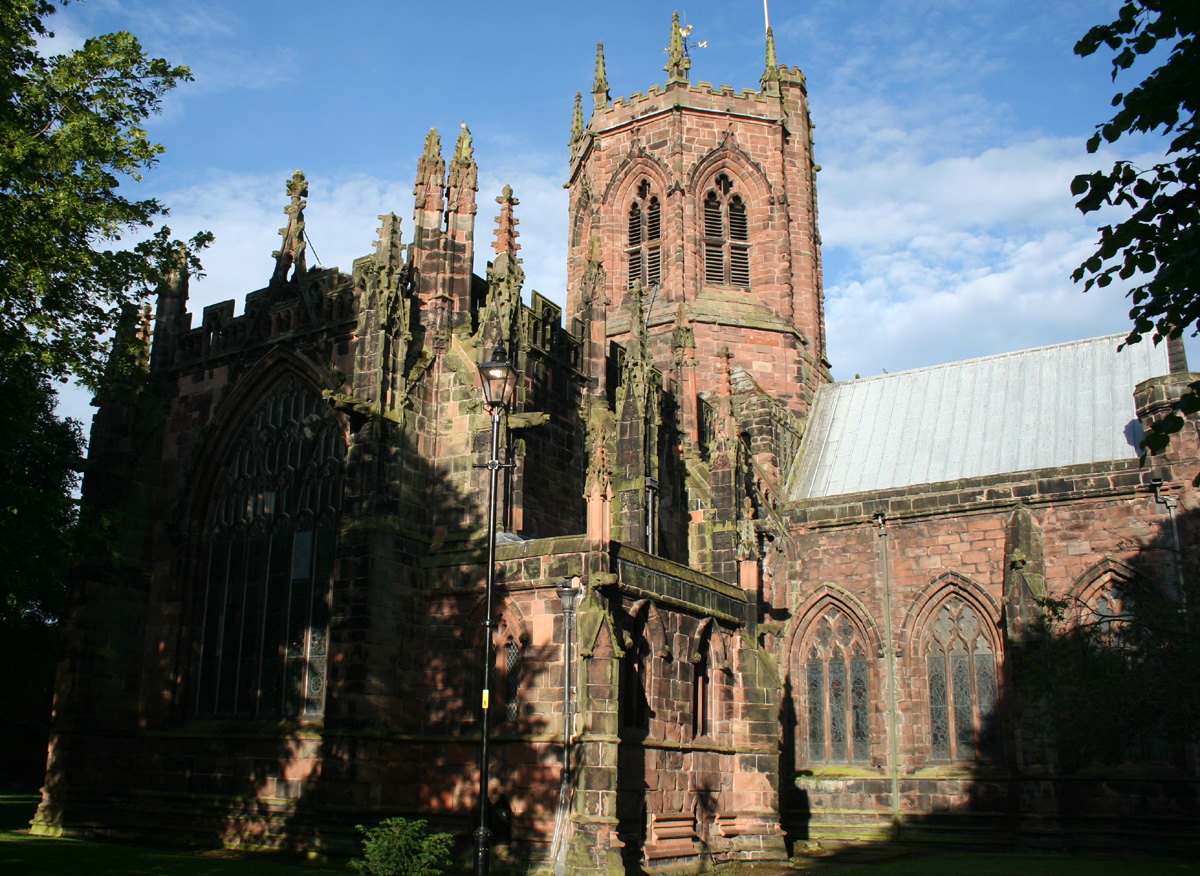
View from the north east

The church is built in red sandstone and is cruciform in shape. Its plan consists of a four-bay nave with north and south aisles, a south porch with two storeys, a central tower, north and south transepts, and a three-bay chancel, to the north of which is a two-storey treasury. The tower is square below and octagonal above. Both transepts are of three bays and the northernmost bay of the north transept was formerly a Lady chapel. The other two bays were dedicated to Saint George. The south transept was known as the Kingsley Chapel.

Pevsner, in addition to complaining about some aspects of Scott's restoration, comments on the abrupt change from the Decorated to the Perpendicular style, no doubt the consequence of the interruption to building work caused by the Black Death. This is particularly so in the chancel where the side windows are "very rich Decorated", with crocketed gables and highly decorated buttresses and pinnacles, while the seven-light east window, also under a crocketed gable, is "pure Perpendicular". The aisle windows and all the windows in the north transept are Decorated, while in the south transept one window is Decorated and all the others are Perpendicular. The bell-openings in the tower are Decorated. Pevsner describes the tower as being the "crowning motif" of the church.

=== Interior ===
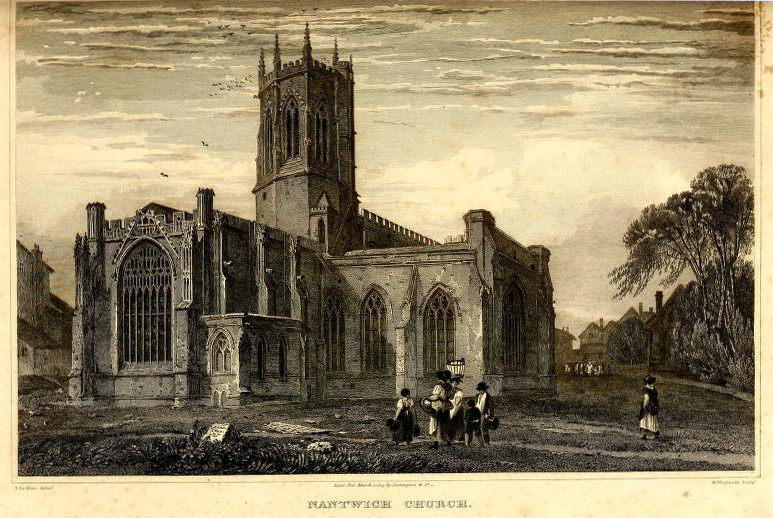
In 1819

==== Nave, transepts and porch ====
The south wall of the nave shows the line of the original roof before it was raised, and contains faint remains of paintings dating from the 19th century, which consist of scriptural inscriptions. In the nave is a Jacobean pulpit, designed by Thomas Finch and made in 1601, which was once part of a three-decker pulpit. It was damaged in 1683 by a falling roof beam and was reduced in the 1855 restoration. Hanging on the wall of the nave are a number of Tudor boards which were taken from the ceiling of the south transept in 1964; one of these is dated 1577. In the south aisle is a small painting of The Widow's Mite by Jules Bouvier. A second pulpit, made of stone and dating from the late-14th century, is attached to the northeast pier of the crossing. This is designed to appear like a large chalice, and is decorated with panel tracery. The wooden crossing vault was designed by Scott. The roof of the north transept is also wooden, but of Tudor design. In the north wall of the transept is an aumbry and in the northeast corner is an oven with a chimney, which was used for baking Communion wafers. The transept contains an oak chest dated 1676 and a bench dated 1737. In the east wall of north transept are a piscina and another aumbry.

There is another piscina in the south transept, although this is damaged, along with an alabaster effigy of Sir David Craddock, who died in about 1384. The effigy was damaged in the Civil War, and was found buried under the chancel floor during the 19th-century restoration. Sir David, who came from Nantwich, was once Mayor of Bordeaux, Justicar of Wales and a money-lender to Richard II. The south transept also contains a tomb dated 1614, which was transferred from the former St Chad's Church, Wybunbury in 1982. This is constructed of alabaster and limestone and includes effigies of Sir Thomas Smith, mayor and sheriff of Chester, and his wife, Anne. In addition the transept contains a number of brass memorials. At the back of the church along the west wall are the Jubilee curtains which were made by the church's Tapestry Group to commemorate the silver jubilee of Elizabeth II in 1977. In the porch the stone vaulting dates from 1879 and it contains the carving of a Green Man, while on the outside of the porch are carvings of the Four Evangelists. The room over the porch formerly housed a library of theological books, including a complete edition (which is thought to be unique) of the Sarum Hymns and Sequences, printed in 1539 by Wynkyn de Worde. This collection is now held at the John Rylands Library, University of Manchester.

==== Chancel ====
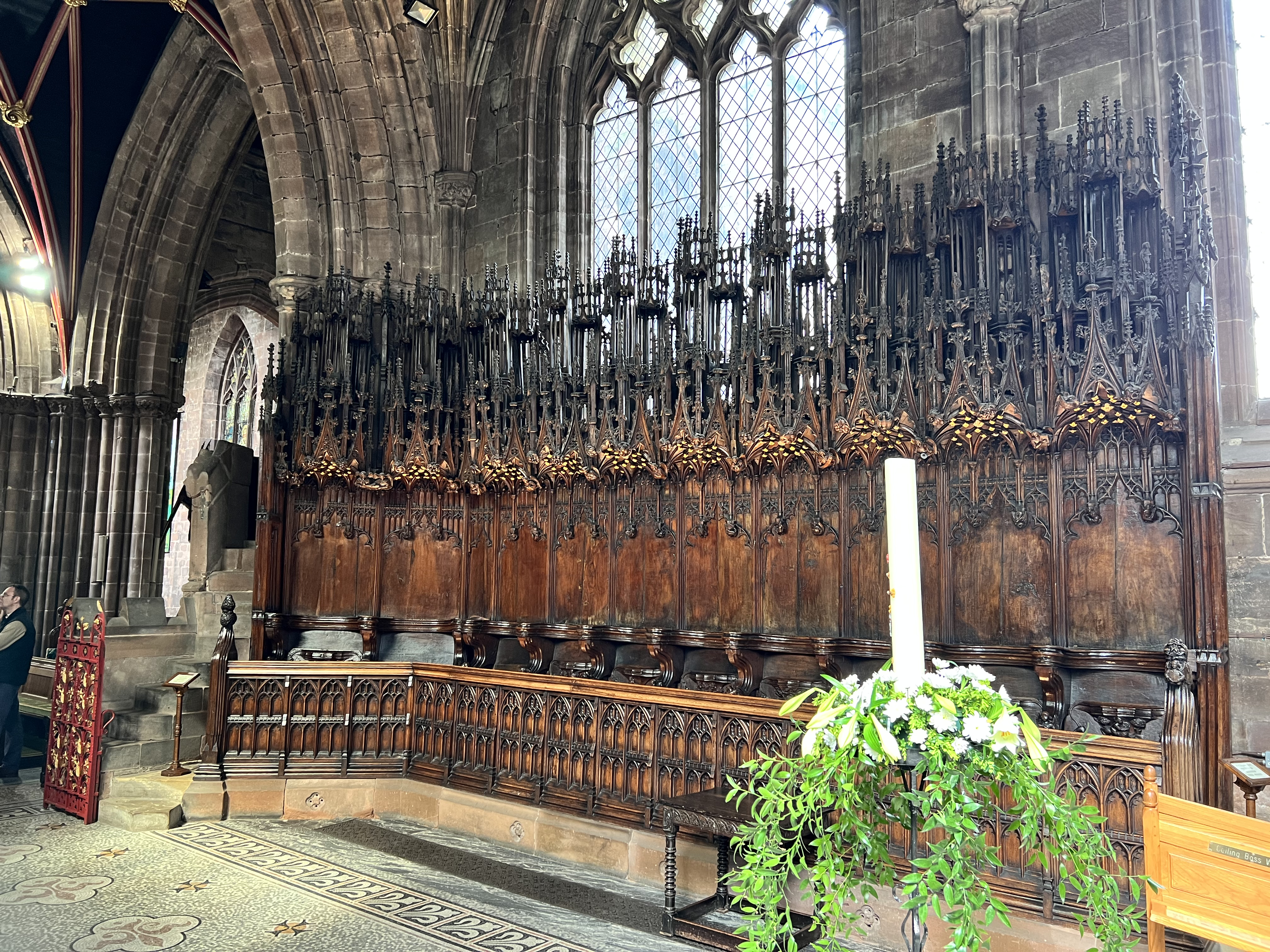
The medieval choir stalls

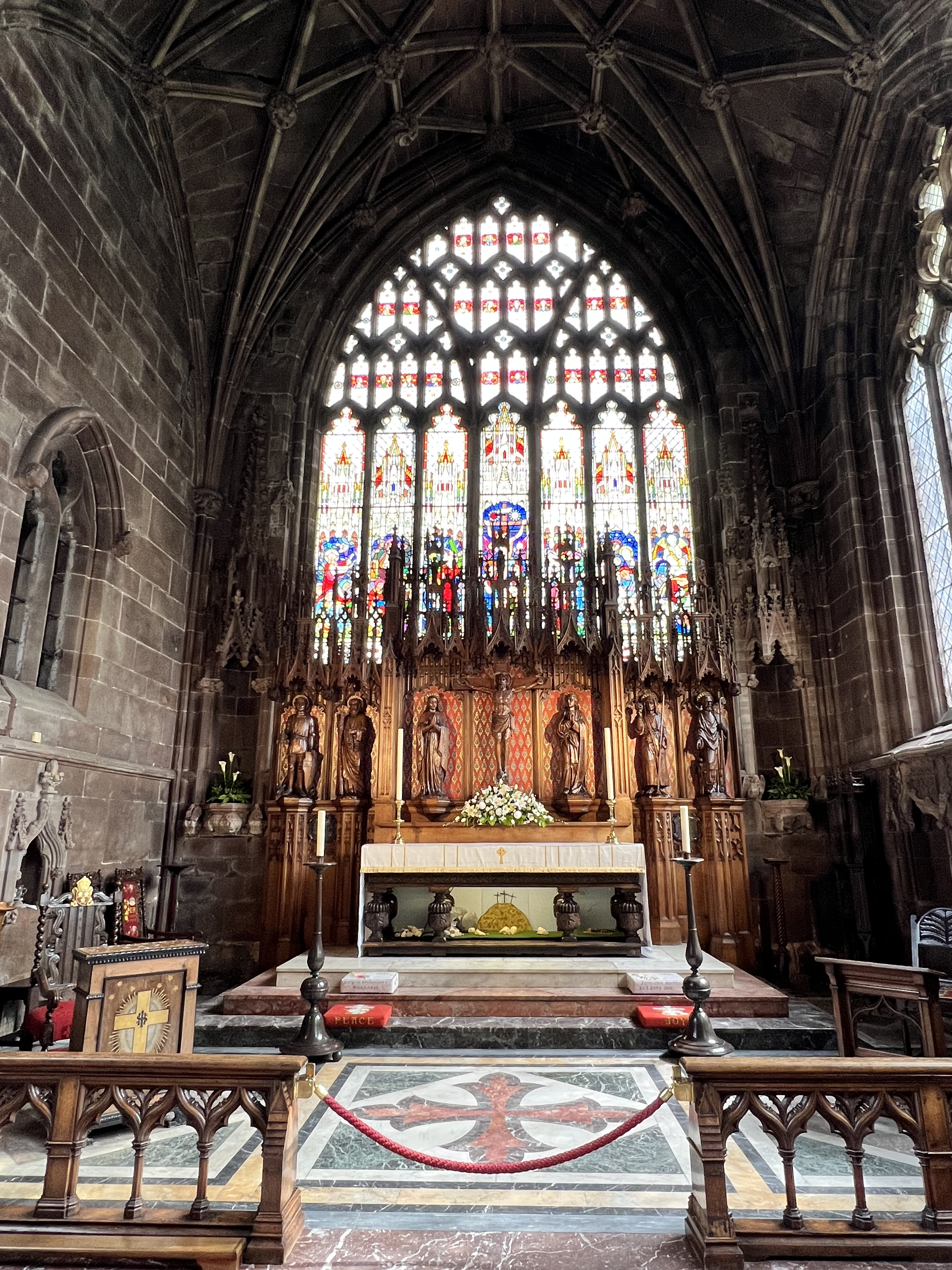
The chancel

The ceiling of the chancel consists of a stone lierne vault with almost 70 carved bosses dating from the 14th century. The eastern bosses depict the life of Mary and the western ones Christ's Passion and Resurrection. Over each choirstall is a carved wooden triple-arched canopy. The canopies are described as having "a complexity unsurpassed in English medieval woodcarving". Clifton-Taylor considered that they are the finest in the country, although he complained that they have been stained nearly black. At the lower ends of the canopies are Victorian carvings of angels, grotesques and foliage and below these are carvings on corbels of subjects such as mermaids, centaurs, wyverns and musical angels. At the back of the choir stalls are 20 misericords which date from the early–mid 15th century. Under of each of these is a different carving; the subjects include Saint George and the Dragon, the Virgin and a unicorn, and a pelican with her brood. At the ends of the choir stalls are carvings of poppyheads, wyverns and a green man.

The altar table is dated 1638. In the north wall of the sanctuary is an aumbry and on the opposite wall are a canopied piscina and a triple sedilia, also with canopies. These canopies are described as being "among the showpieces of the 14th century masons". The reredos was dedicated in 1919 and contains carvings of Christ on the Cross, Mary and John, and the four national saints, Saints George, Andrew, Patrick and David. The canopies above them echo those of the choir stalls.

==== Stained glass and other features ====
The stained glass in the west window dates from 1875; it was made by Clayton and Bell and depicts the Presentation of Jesus at the Temple. Also by Clayton and Bell is a window at the west end of the north wall of the nave depicting Enoch, Noah, Job and Abel. To the east of this is a window designed by Michael Farrar-Bell dated 1985, to the memory of a local farmer, depicting the Creation. Beyond this is a window from 1901 made by Reuben Bennett which depicts the Good Shepherd with David and Miriam. On the south wall of the nave is a window from 1919 by Harry Clarke depicting Richard Coeur-de-Lion, saints and military emblems. In other windows on the south wall there are fragments of old glass. The north wall of the north transept contains a window with stained glass by Kempe which incorporates some pieces of medieval glass and depicts the Tree of Jesse. On the east wall of the transept are two windows by John Hardman which date from 1862 and 1864. The south transept contains a window dating from 1855 with stained glass by William Wailes. The east window was reglazed in 1876 by Clayton and Bell; it shows episodes from the life of Christ with figures of apostles and prophets. In the porch is more stained glass by Kempe, dating from 1878.

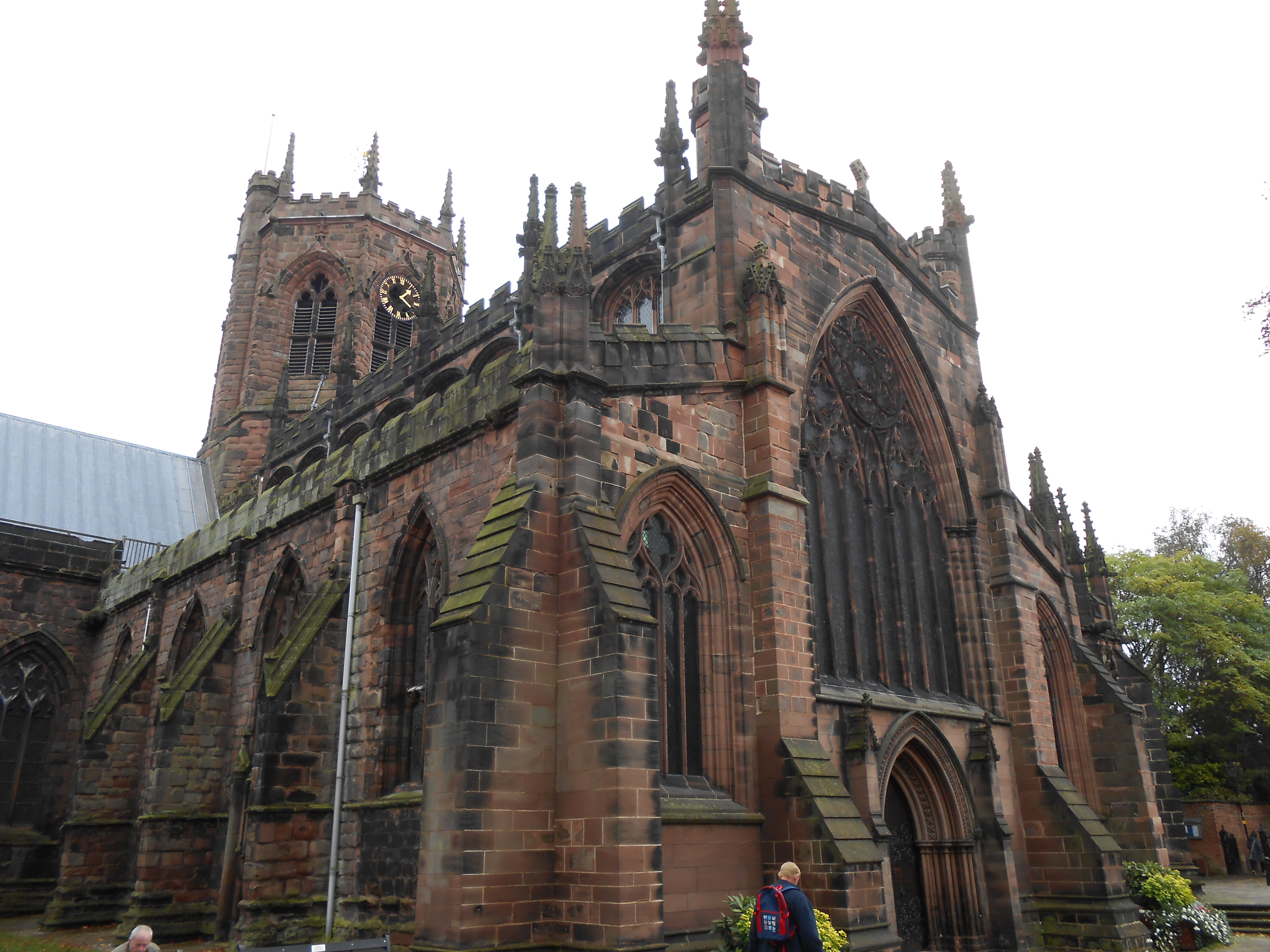
View

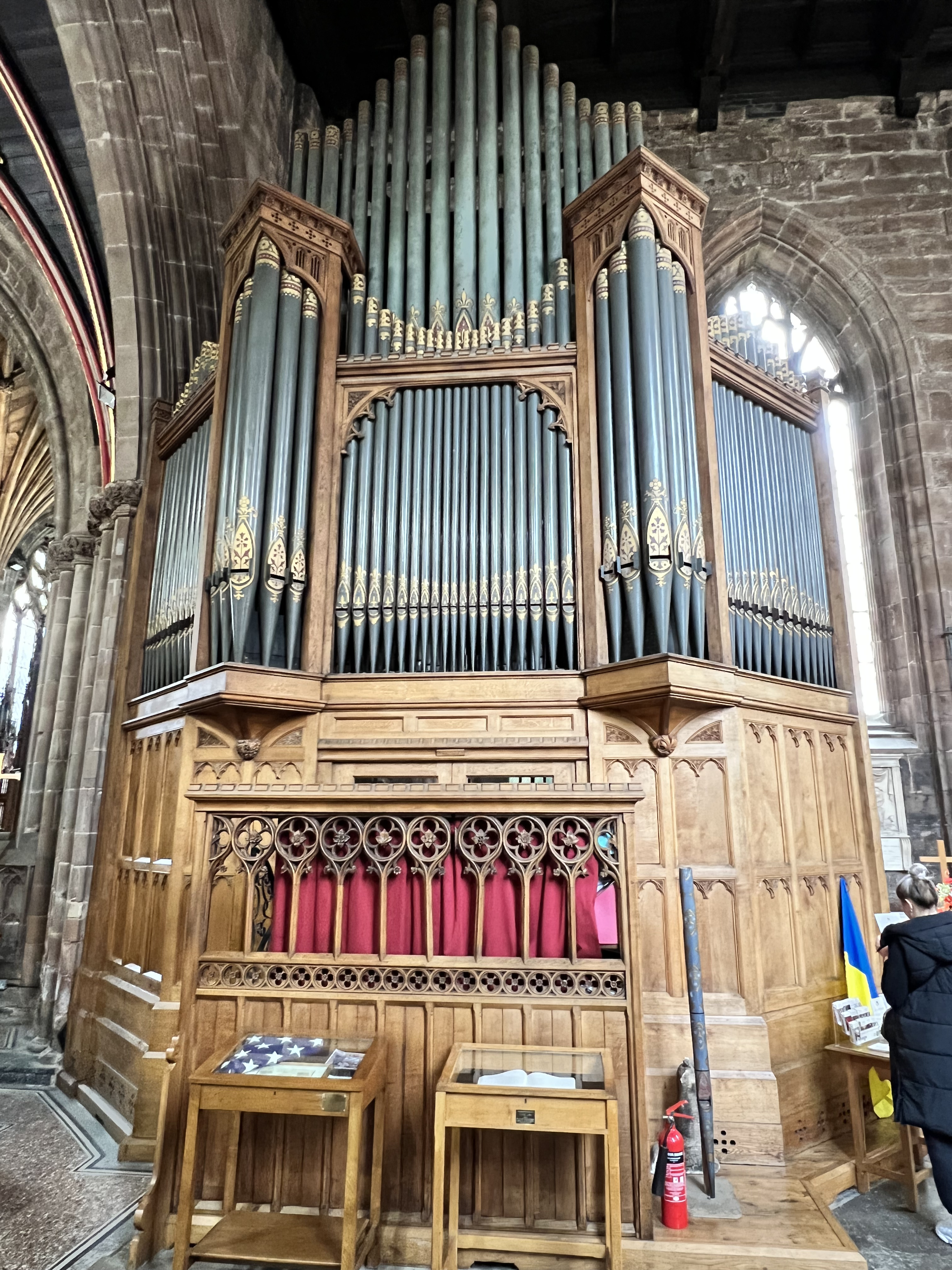
The organ by Forster and Andrews

The original organ of 1809 was moved from its central position in the crossing to the north transept where it was repaired and greatly enlarged at a cost of £311 (equivalent to £33,800 in 2025) by William Hill & Sons during Scott's restoration in 1859 The instrument performed badly following the move, which was attributed to the cold and dampness of its new position. Consequently, it was moved to the south transept, but it performed no better there, and in 1889 it was sold to Haydock church. The present organ was built in 1890 by Forster and Andrews. The casework of oak was designed by Thomas Bower, architect of Nantwich and the specification was approved by Dr. J.C. Bridge, organist of Chester Cathedral, who gave the opening recital on 21 May 1890. It was partly rebuilt in about 1925. Electric blowing apparatus and a new chamber to house it was added to the church. It was again rebuilt in 1973 by Charles Whiteley and Company, who installed electro-pneumatic action among other additions and repairs. Rushworth and Dreaper made further additions during their 1994 restoration.

The parish registers date back to 1539 and contain much material relating to Nantwich's history. There is a ring of eight bells, four of which were cast by Rudhall of Gloucester in 1713, and the other four by John Taylor and Company in 1922.

== Present day ==
The church attracts large numbers each Sunday. It offers a range of services, from the traditional to the contemporary. During the week there are activities for children, young people and adults. The Rector is the Revd. Dr. Mark Hart. Other clergy include the Revd. Paul Wheeler, Curate. The Director of Music is Alison Phillips, and the Organist is Simon Russell. Various events, including concerts, are held in the church. Nantwich Choral Society perform in a number of venues and its "chosen venue" is St Mary's because "its acoustics are superb".

== See also ==
- Grade I listed buildings in Cheshire East
- Grade I listed churches in Cheshire
- Listed buildings in Nantwich
