= William Malbank =

William Malbank or William de Malbanc may refer to:

- William Malbank, 1st Baron of Wich Malbank
- William Malbank, 3rd Baron of Wich Malbank (c. 1125–1176)

== See also ==
- Malbon, the surname used by the descendants of the first William Malbank
