= Nantwich and Acton Grammar School =

Nantwich and Acton Grammar School can refer to:

- Malbank School and Sixth Form College, modern school at the end of Welsh Row (after 1921)
- Nantwich Grammar School, historical school at 108 Welsh Row (pre-1921)
