= Malbon =

Origin
- Language: Anglo-Norman
- Meaning: "dirty white"
- Region of origin: England

Malbon is a surname of the descendants of William Malbank, First Baron of Nantwich.

== People ==
- Anthony Malbon (born 1991), English footballer
- Fabian Malbon (born 1946), Vice Admiral and Lieutenant Governor of Guernsey
- John Malbon Thompson (1830–1908), Australian lawyer and politician
- Joy Malbon, Canadian journalist

== Places ==
- Malbon, Queensland, town in Kuridala, Shire of Cloncurry, Australia

== See also ==
- William Malbank, 1st Baron of Wich Malbank
- William Malbank, 3rd Baron of Wich Malbank
- Malbank School and Sixth Form College, a secondary school in Nantwich
