= Stephen Eichhorn =

British materials scientist

Professor Stephen James Eichhorn CEng FREng FRSC FInstP FIMMM ACSF
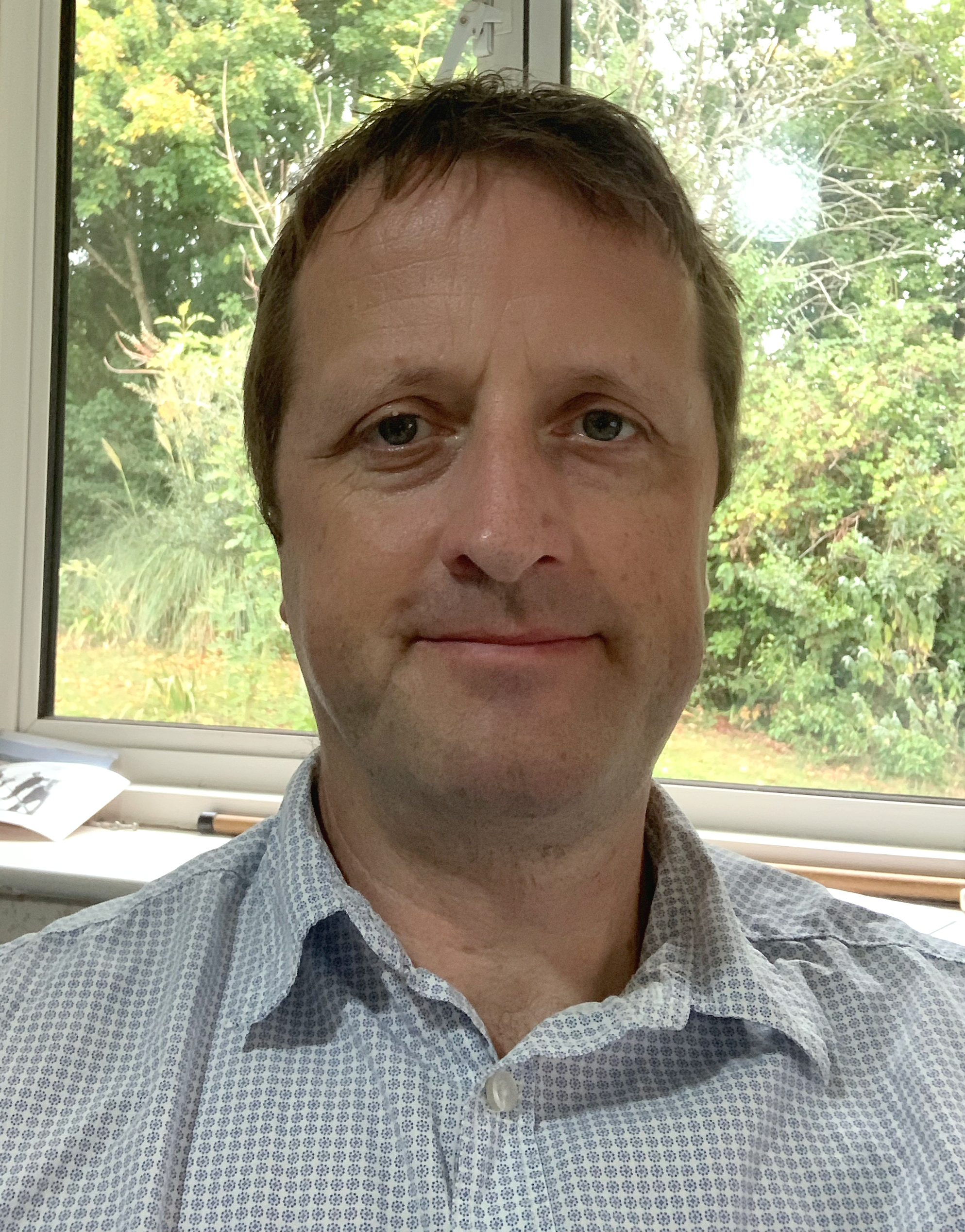
- Eichhorn in 2022
- Born: Manchester
- Education: Leeds University; UMIST
- Children: 2
- Awards: Rosenhain Medal, Hayashi Jisuke Prize, Swinburne Medal
- Scientific career
- Fields: cellulosic materials
- Workplaces: Manchester University, Exeter University, Bristol University
- Doctoral advisor: Wadood Hamad
- Other academic advisors: Professor Robert Young FRS FREng

Stephen James Eichhorn (born 24 July 1972) FREng FRSC FInstP FIMMM ACSF CEng is Professor of Materials Science and Engineering at the University of Bristol. He is a fellow of the Royal Society of Chemistry, the Institute of Physics and the Institute of Materials, Minerals, and Mining.

== Early life and education ==
Born in Manchester and brought up near Nantwich, Eichhorn attended Malbank High School. On leaving school he went to University of Leeds to study Physics, graduating in 1993. He then went on to study for an MSc in Forestry and Paper Industries Technology at UMIST and Bangor University until 1996. He then undertook doctoral research into cellulose fibres as a PhD student, graduating in 1999. Following this he undertook postdoctoral research at UMIST under the supervision of Robert Young where he worked on cellulose fibres and micromechanics using Raman Spectroscopy.

== Academic career ==
Eichhorn was hired as a Lecturer in 2002 in Polymer Physics and Biomaterials and was promoted to Senior lecturer in 2006 and Reader in 2008, all at UMIST and the newly formed University of Manchester. In 2011 he moved to the University of Exeter as Chair in Materials Science and was Head of Engineering from 2014-2017. In 2017 he moved to the University of Bristol as Professor of Materials Science and Engineering, and was interim Head of School (in 2017/18). He was awarded an EPSRC ED&I fellowship in the Physical Sciences in 2021. He was recently appointed as incoming Director of the Henry Royce Institute in Manchester and a Chair in Advanced Materials.

== Research ==
Eichhorn's research focusses on the structure property relationships of cellulose and renewable materials as well as an interest in decolonisation of STEM subjects and has published in this area, Other published on this topic include a book titled "Can Higher Education Be Decolonised?" and an article (co-authored with Selim Tudgey) in the Institute of Materials, Minerals and Mining magazine Materials World "Decolonising Materials Science".

In 2021 he was one of the authors of a paper in the journal Science on moldable wood. He published the first paper that showed that the modulus of tunicate cellulose nanocrystals was exceptionally high (around 143 GPa), and also carried out similar work on bacterial cellulose and microcrystalline cellulose. He has since demonstrated the use of cellulose in a variety of potential applications, including supercapacitors and lithium-ion batteries, sodium-ion batteries, and sodium metal batteries. He is the first author of two highly-cited review papers in Journal of Materials Science on the subject of cellulose fibres and natural fibre composites.

Other research has included the production of synthetic seashell structures in collaboration with the chemist Fiona Meldrum and also work on the mechanical properties of fingernails, stories about which appeared in the UK press.

Eichhorn has over 20,000 citations to his published works, and an H-index of 68.

== Awards and honours ==
Eichhorn was awarded the Rosenhain Medal & Prize from the Institute of Materials, Minerals and Mining in 2012, the Hayashi Jisuke Award from the Japanese Cellulose Society in 2017, and the Swinburne Medal in 2020 again from the Institute of Materials, Minerals and Mining. Eichhorn was a runner up for a prize for the best paper to be published in Journal of the Royal Society Interface for a paper co-authored with Professor William Sampson, Manchester University. He was the first UK based scientist to be a Chair of the Cellulose and Renewable Materials Division of the American Chemical Society in 2015. In 2025 he was made the first ever UK-based Fellow of the American Chemical Society., and a Fellow of the Royal Academy of Engineering.

He was also a member of the Strategic Advisory Board for the Henry Royce Institute until 2025 and was a member of the Strategic Advisory Team (SAT) for Engineering at the Engineering and Physical Sciences Research Council.

== Other work ==
Eichhorn appeared in an episode of the One Show with talking about the strength of nanocellulose, and has contributed comments on other people's research in various articles. In 2011 Eichhorn also got the local council to remove double yellow lines from outside a house he was renting out in Glossop, the story of which appeared in the Manchester Evening News. He was a co-opted member of the Windrush Commemoration Committee chaired by Floella Benjamin.
