= Nantwich Bridge =

Bridge in Nantwich, Cheshire, England

Coordinates: 53.0676°N 2.5245°W

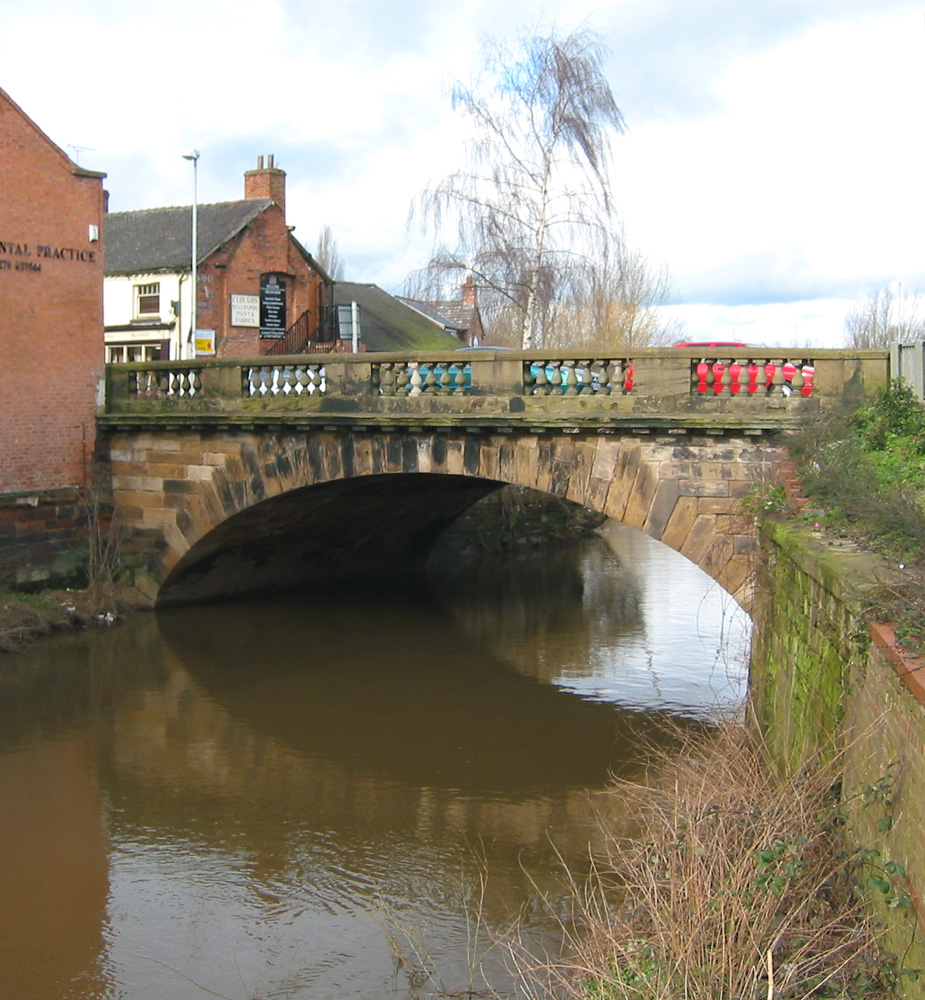
The present Nantwich Bridge (viewed from the south) dates from 1803.

Nantwich Bridge (also known as the Welsh Row Bridge and formerly the Welsh Bridge) is a stone bridge carrying Welsh Row over the River Weaver in the town of Nantwich, Cheshire, England. The existing bridge replaces a 17th-century stone bridge; it dates from 1803 and is listed at grade II. An earlier timber bridge known as the Wich Bridge is first mentioned at the end of the 14th century; it is described as having a chapel and shops on it.

Nantwich lay on the main London–Chester road, an important transport route, and the bridge was heavily used for trade and military purposes from the medieval era until the 19th century.

== Background ==
The earliest crossing of the River Weaver was via a ford to the south of the existing bridge, near the probable site of the Norman castle. A Roman trackway running at an angle to the course of Welsh Row was found during excavations by the existing bridge in 2007. A medieval wooden causeway running beneath the modern street was also uncovered. The town's location on the main London to Chester road meant that the crossing would have seen heavy use from the medieval era, including by soldiers en route to Wales and later Ireland. The opening of Telford's road from London to Holyhead resulted in a decline in travel via this route from the 1830s.

== Timber bridge ==
The first references to a bridge in the town occur in documents of 5 January 1398–9 and 1438–9. Known as the Wich Bridge (also Wiche or Wych), it was a timber structure on which stood St Ann's Chapel and four shops. Medieval chapels built on bridges also existed in other Cheshire towns, including Congleton and Stockport. Few bridge chapels now survive in Britain, but a good example is the Chantry Chapel of St Mary the Virgin in Wakefield, which dates from around 1350. A priest would have said prayers for the safety of travellers on payment of a fee. The fate of St Ann's Chapel is unknown, but it is not mentioned in records of chantry chapels of 1545, and had presumably closed before that date.

The bridge was originally maintained and repaired by the town. Tolls were levied on goods passing through the town as pontage and pavage for the maintenance of the bridge and road; in 1282, for example, a ½ d toll was levied per cartload, with goods destined for military use being exempt. The bridge appears to have survived the fire of 1583, which started nearby and destroyed much of the town to the east of the river. In 1622, William Webb writes:

A strong timber bridge over the stream of the Weever is maintained by the town, which requires no little care and cost, by reason of the monstrous carriages of the wood in carts which is brought thither for the boiling of their salt.

In 1652, Wich Bridge was described as lying on "y^{e} greatest & most frequented Road within this County", and it was designated a county bridge on 27 April 1652. This meant that the county was responsible for its maintenance, but also that Nantwich had to pay towards the maintenance of the other county bridges, a charge from which the town had previously been exempt.

== Stone bridge of 1664 ==
By 1663, a few years after the Restoration of the monarchy, the bridge was described by Roger Wilbraham as "in decay". Wilbraham was a prominent Nantwich resident who lived at Townsend House on Welsh Row; he later endowed the town's Widows' Almshouses. Anxious to avoid the town having to pay for its repair despite 12 years of contributing to other county bridges, Wilbraham and others successfully petitioned the justices of the peace for the construction of "a substantiall Bridge of Stone" at the county's expense.

Wilbraham commissioned local mason, Tim Adams, to build the bridge, starting in July 1663; it was complete by the beginning of July of the following year. The county contributed £90 towards its cost, together with 20 marks (£13 6s 8d) to pave the bridge and the road on either side. Wilbraham writes that "My little boy, a Twin of 2 years old, was the first corpse that was carried over the new Bridge the begin^{g} of July 1664."

By 1742, the new bridge had again become dilapidated, and £9 19s 6d was spent on its repair.

== Stone bridge of 1803 ==
The existing stone bridge was built in 1803 by local mason, William Lightfoot. By the 1880s the official name on Ordnance Survey maps had changed to the Welsh Bridge. The single arch has a cornice decorated with modillions at the road level. The bridge is finished with a stone balustrade in which groups of balusters alternate with solid stone blocks. The bridge was repaired in the 21st century and some of the balusters were replaced.

It remained the main road bridge crossing the Weaver within the town until the 21st century, when the A534 was diverted away from Welsh Row and the triple-arched Sir Thomas Fairfax Bridge was constructed to the north of the Welsh Row bridge.

== See also ==
- Listed buildings in Nantwich
