= Joseph Partridge (historian) =

English waggoner, schoolteacher, clergyman, antiquary and historian

The Reverend Joseph Partridge (1724 – 25 October 1796) was an English waggoner, schoolteacher, clergyman, antiquary and historian. Despite the lack of a university education, he was ordained in his forties and subsequently wrote the first history of the Cheshire town of Nantwich, published in 1774. He also published religious works, including a didactic poem, The Anti-Atheist.

== Early life ==
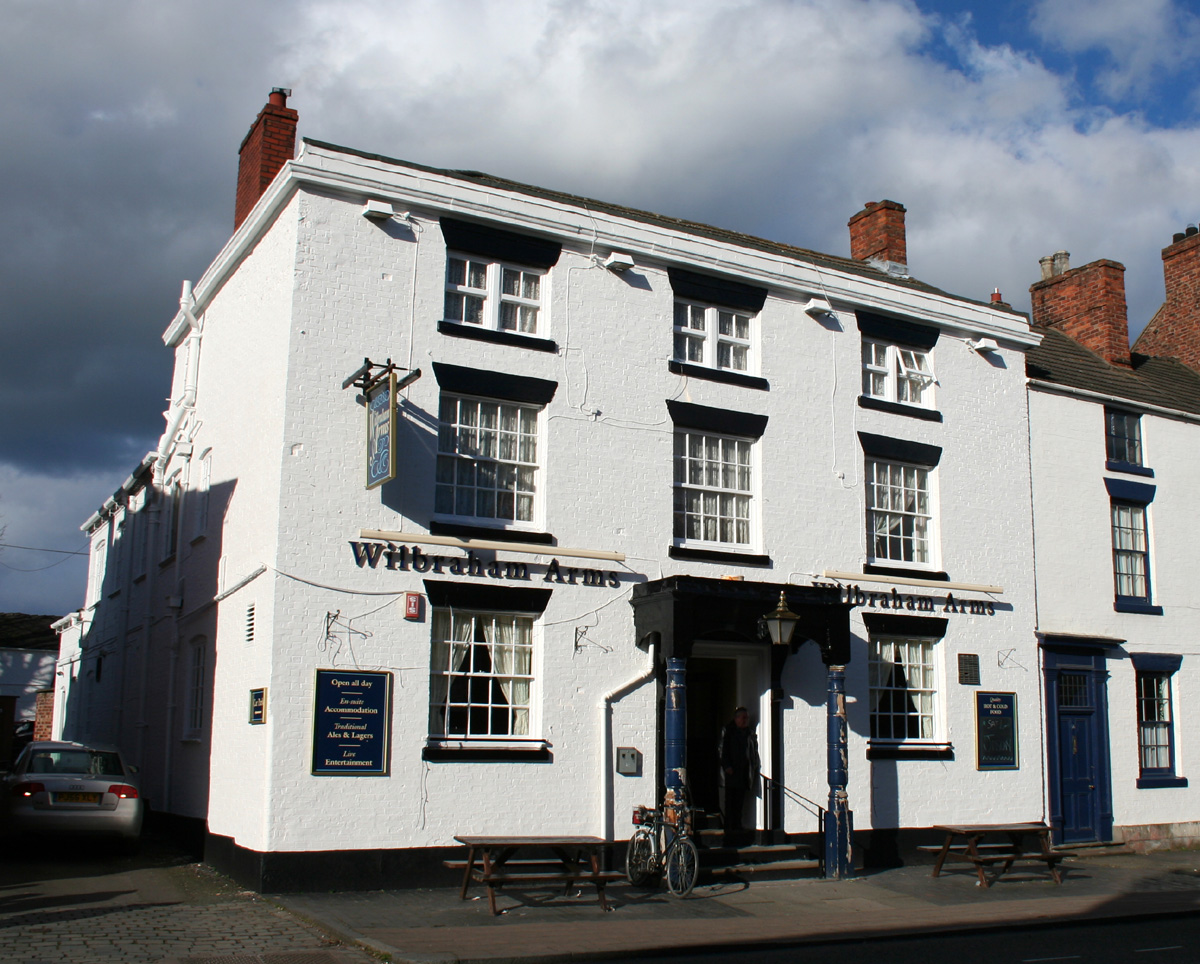
Modern Wilbraham Arms

Partridge was born at the Red Lion Inn (now the Wilbraham Arms) on Welsh Row in Nantwich, where his father, also named Joseph Partridge, was the landlord. He was baptised on 1 May 1724. His father also worked as a waggoner, transporting goods to London. His mother, Sarah Tew (died 1771/2), was probably the daughter of John Tew (died 1722), another Nantwich waggoner. His parents had married on 13 October 1722. Nothing is known of Partridge's early life or education, except that he never attended university. It is possible that he attended one of the two boys' schools of the town, the grammar school or the Blue Cap Charity School, or the free grammar school at nearby Acton.

When his father died on 15 August 1756, Partridge took over his haulage business. He married Mary (1726/7–1806) at an unknown date, and their only child, Jane, was baptised in Nantwich on 15 August 1757. His occupation was then described as "waggoner".

== Clergyman and schoolmaster ==
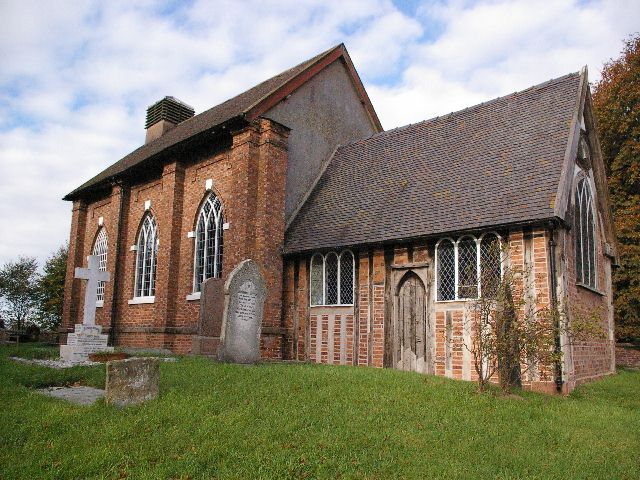
St Michael's, Baddiley

Employment as a waggoner does not seem to have satisfied Partridge. Aged about 42, despite his lack of university education, he was ordained by the Church of England. In around 1766, he took up the positions of curate at St Michael's Church, Baddiley and chaplain of Woodhey Chapel, Faddiley, two villages near Nantwich, holding both positions for the remainder of his life. The curacy of Baddiley paid an annual income of £30.

The resignation of Edward Hughes on 9 June 1788 led to Partridge also being nominated as schoolmaster of the free grammar school of Acton by several members of the school's board. Partridge gained the consent of Edmund Keene, Bishop of Chester, to take up the post on 26 August 1766. The school had been founded in 1662 and the original salary was £20 a year. It accepted boys from the sons of gentlemen and yeomen to the parish's poor, charging fees that depended on the class of the pupil. The school building, demolished in the late 19th century, stood in the churchyard of St Mary's Church, Acton. Boys were taught grammar, Latin, Greek and religion, and one of the earliest masters had held a degree from the University of Oxford. School hours were from 7 a.m. to 5 p.m. in summer and from 8 a.m. to 3.30 p.m. in winter, with a two-hour break for lunch.

His social ascent did not go unnoticed in the town. In 1768, he was lampooned as "Ye Cassocked Waggoner, drole Tale" in the anonymous verse, "Nantwich Notables", published in the Cheshire Sheaf; his wife was described as "Modern extravagance."

In August 1772, Partridge took over as schoolmaster of the Blue Cap Charity School in Nantwich from Joseph Hilditch, who died later that year. The reason for the move from a grammar school to a charity school, an apparent demotion, is not known. The Blue Cap School is first documented in 1712, when there were 40 boys described as wearing "blue caps that their behaviour may be the better observed abroad;" pupils were accepted from the age of 8. No dedicated schoolhouse was ever built, and teaching took place in rented rooms in a house in Pepper Street, since demolished. Such charity schools usually taught reading, writing and arithmetic, as well as preparing pupils for apprenticeships, but Partridge records only tuition in English and writing. He is also known to have used John Lewis's popular Church Catechism Explained for teaching the catechism.

Patridge remained the master at the Blue Cap School for nearly 25 years until his death, which occurred on 25 October 1796. He was buried at St Mary's Church, Nantwich. His wife survived him by almost a decade, dying on 1 January 1806. Both were commemorated on a gravestone in the churchyard, which remained visible in 1883.

== Works ==
Partridge's history of Nantwich, entitled An Historical Account of the Town and Parish of Nantwich, with a Particular Relation of the Remarkable Siege it Sustained in the Grand Rebellion of 1643, was first published anonymously in 1774. Printed by W. Williams of Shrewsbury, it ran to 89 pages. It is the earliest history of the town. An abridged version of it was reprinted in 1778 as part of the second volume of John Poole's History of Cheshire. According to Victorian historian James Hall, a subsequent history by John Weld Platt of 1818 also drew substantially from Partridge. Although largely now superseded by Hall's history of 1883, Partridge's work remains a valuable account of the town and its industries in the 1770s.

In addition to this history, Partridge also published several other works. Before his ordination, he had a pamphlet printed in 1754 which related to a dispute of unknown nature with Thomas Burrow of Manchester. He also published two religious works. The first, The Anti-Atheist: A Didactic Poem in Two Parts, a 46-page work of poetry, came out in 1766, around the time of his ordination. C. W. Sutton, writing in the Oxford Dictionary of National Biography, describes it as demonstrating "his religious orthodoxy." In 1778, he had a sermon printed, entitled "The Renovation of the Heart, the only True and Acceptable Fast".
