= Nantwich Castle =

Norman castle in Cheshire, England

Coordinates: 53.067°N 2.523°W

Nantwich Castle was a Norman castle in Nantwich, Cheshire, England, built before 1180 to guard a ford across the River Weaver. The castle is first documented in 1288. It was last recorded in 1462, and was in ruins by 1485. No trace now remains above ground; excavations in 1978 near the Crown Inn uncovered terracing and two ditches, one or both of which possibly formed the castle's bailey.

== History ==
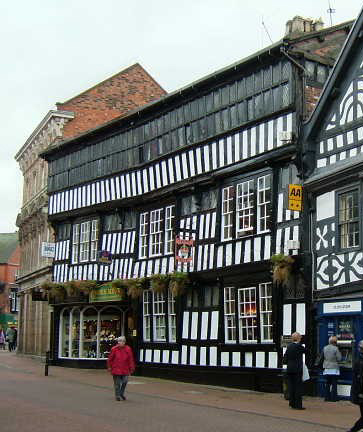
The Crown Inn stands near the location of the castle

The castle was in existence before 1180. There is little evidence either for who founded it or for its precise date of foundation. Some sources assume it was probably built by William Malbank, the first baron of Nantwich. However, local historian Eric Garton cites one document in which it is referred to as "the Castle of Piers Malbanke", whose existence is not otherwise recorded; he might have been one of the brothers of William Malbank, or of his heirs, Hugh and William. Archaeological evidence suggests that the castle stood on slightly elevated ground between the River Weaver and the modern High Street and Mill Street, probably near the Crown Inn. This is one of the highest points in Nantwich, and would have commanded a strong position near the ford of the Weaver, which was south of the existing bridge.

Although a baronial castle, Nantwich was not one of the major castles of Cheshire. The only description, which dates from an 1818 history of the town by John Weld Platt, claims it was "square, surmounted at each angle with turrets. The outer walls of the castle were defended by a moat of considerable breadth, passable only by a draw-bridge." However, the later historian James Hall considers Platt's description to be "purely fictitious, and therefore of no historical importance".

After the death of the third baron in around 1160–70 without male issue, the lands and privileges of the barony were divided between his three daughters. An inquisition dated 15 May 1288 states that the castle passed to his eldest daughter, Philippa; this is the earliest documentary evidence of its existence. Philippa Malbank married Thomas, Lord Basset, and their daughter and co-heir, also Philippa, married Henry de Beaumont, 5th Earl of Warwick. The castle passed back to the Earl of Chester in the 13th century, when Philippa, Countess of Warwick, died without issue.

On 22 June 1278, the castle was granted by Edward I to Randle de Merton, and then passed to Sir Randle Praers on 25 August of the same year. His grandson Thomas Praers alienated most of his lands, including the castle, to his neighbour John Gryffyn of Bartherton during his lifetime for the nominal rent of one rose annually. This act appears to have been contested as, on 16 May 1344, Edward the Black Prince, Earl of Chester, wrote (spelling modernized):

Forasmuch as we have been given to understand that Thomas de Prayers of Bertonlegh in our County of Chester was a natural born fool and in his foolishness hath aliened and granted a part of his lands to the great damage of himself and ourselves wherefore we caused him to come before us to be examined and we caused him to be examined by the members of our council and others learned in the law, and upon such examination it was found that he is a man of sound memory and as such is sufficiently able to govern himself and his lands in a proper manner of which we are informed by those who have examinded into it.

On Thomas Praers' death, the castle passed by the marriage of his daughter and heir, Elizabeth, to Sir Robert Fouleshurst, and subsequently remained in the Fouleshurst family.

Though it is uncertain when the castle was abandoned, the archaeologist Robina McNeil Sale suggests this likely took place in the late 14th or early 15th century. The castle was last recorded in 1462, and had fallen into ruins by 1485. Stone from the castle is thought to have been reused in St Mary's Church, according to some sources for building the Kingsley Chapel (south transept); however, the chapel probably dates from around 1405. In 1550, the area was called Lamburcote or Lambercote, and was grazing land. By the early 19th century, when George Ormerod wrote his History, no trace of the castle remained above ground. Much of the area was levelled for use as a car park in the 1950s.

== Modern remains ==
In 1978, excavations behind the Crown Inn by Robina McNeil Sale and others found evidence of terracing, perhaps representing a platform or mound. These excavations also uncovered two aligned ditches, a steep-sided earlier one, possibly pre-medieval in date, and a larger medieval one. The later of these might have formed the outer bailey of the castle, although it is smaller than those of most castles, possibly because the nearby river formed a natural barrier. Alternatively, it might have been used as a moat. This ditch was allowed to silt up in the 13th century, which might indicate when the castle ceased to have a defensive function. The earlier ditch might be an earlier part of the castle's defences, which was replaced by the later ditch. Alternatively, it might form part of an earlier structure, perhaps the ditch mentioned in the Domesday survey as bordering one side of the town's salt houses.

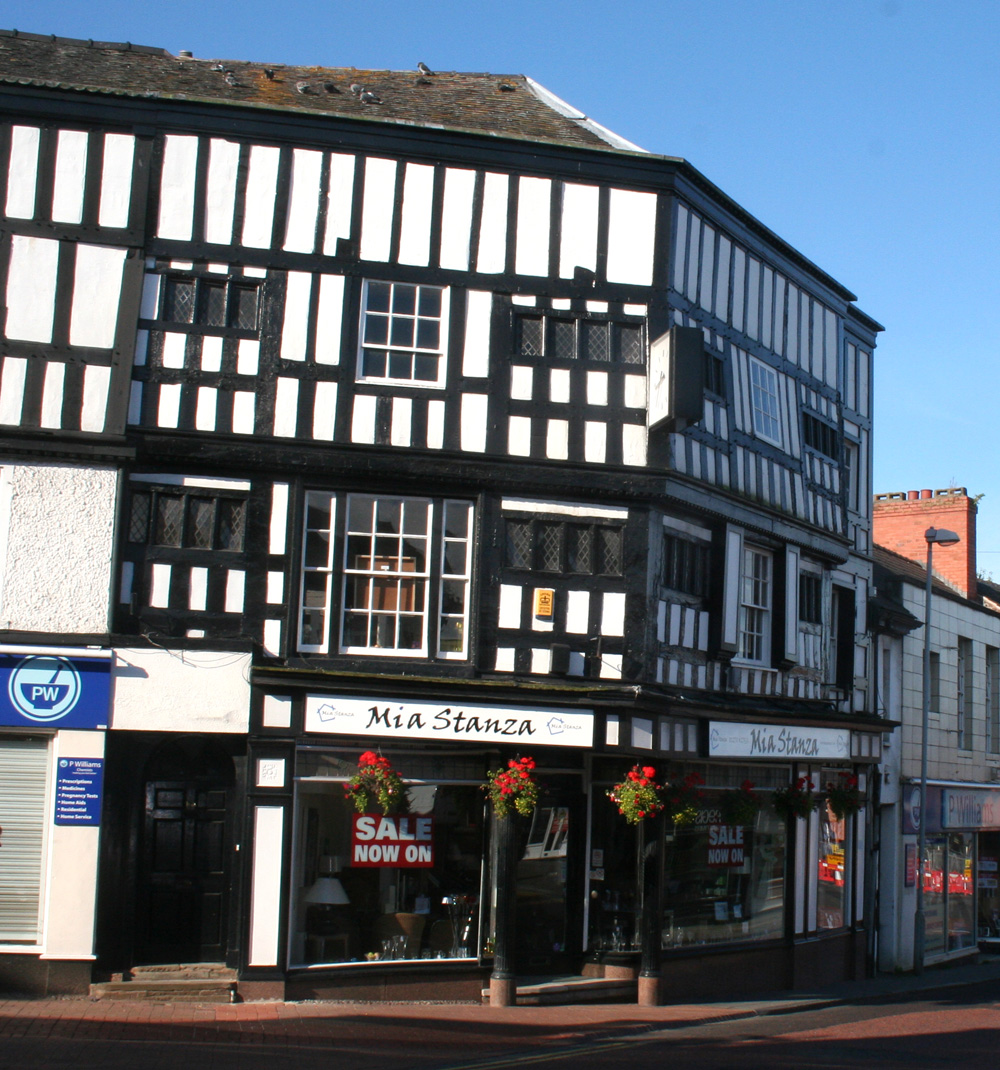
A bend in the High Street traces the castle's outer wall

Earlier excavations of 1974 and 1976 behind 28 High Street (then the National Westminster Bank) by David Hill of Manchester University also uncovered a large ditch, which McNeil Sale considers is likely to be a continuation of one of the ditches from the 1978 excavations. Evidence for a drawbridge was uncovered during sewerage works in 1979.

No evidence for stone buildings has yet been discovered. This might be because the stone was entirely reused, or because the buildings were located in a position which has not been excavated, perhaps under the modern High Street. It is possible that the castle was never more than a small timber structure.

The castle has influenced the town's street plan. The modern High Street is believed to trace the castle's outer wall; from Hospital Street (the town's earliest street), it curves gently round to meet the River Weaver, with a sharper bend, currently occupied by Regent House. All the major streets on the east of the river radiate outwards from the High Street. The name "Castle Street" is believed to derive from the castle, although the name was first recorded in 1489 when the castle was already in ruins. The excavation at the castle is one of two major excavations to have taken place in Nantwich.

== See also ==
- List of castles in Cheshire
