= William Malbank, 3rd Baron of Wich Malbank =

Norman landowner

William Malbank
- Born: Circa 1125
- Died: Circa 1176 (aged 50–51)
- Known for: Anglo-Norman baron
- Relatives: William Malbank, 1st Baron of Wich Malbank - Grandfather

William Malbank (also William de Malbanc and William II de Malbank) (c. 1125 – 1176) was a Norman landowner who was the third Baron of Wich Malbank, now known as Nantwich, in Cheshire. His grandfather of the same name was the first Baron.

== Biography ==
The son of Hugh Malbank, 2nd Baron, and his wife, Petronilla, he held substantial lands in and around the salt town of Nantwich, amounting to much of the Nantwich hundred. His father founded Combermere Abbey in Cheshire in around 1133, and William Malbank is known to have confirmed the foundation and added further gifts.

Little else is recorded of his life. His wife Andilicia probably died early in the reign of Henry II. They had no male heirs and, on his death, his lands and the privileges of the Nantwich barony were divided between his three daughters. Philippa, the eldest, inherited Nantwich Castle as part of her share of the town. She married Thomas Basset of Headington in Oxfordshire. The second daughter, Eleanor, did not marry; her lands were granted to Henry de Audley. Auda (also Adena), the youngest daughter, married Warin (also Warren) de Vernon; their daughter Auda (also Aldetha) brought Sandon in Staffordshire by marriage to Sir William Stafford, a member of the great baronial family of Stafford Castle. He was the lord of Le Bény-Bocage in Calvados.

== See also ==
- Malbon, the modern version of the Malbank surname
