= Moldable wood =

Superwood, an invention made by Dr. Hu's laboratory

Moldable wood is a strong and flexible cellulose-based material. Moldable wood can be folded into different shapes without breaking or snapping. The patented synthesis is based on the deconstruction and softening of the wood's lignin, then re-swelling the material in a rapid "water-shock" process that produces a wrinkled cell wall structure. The result of this unique structure is a flexible wood material that can be molded or folded, with the final shape locked in plate by simple air-drying. This discovery broadens the potential applications of wood as a sustainable structural material. This research, which was a collaborative effort between the University of Maryland, Yale University, Ohio State University, USDA Forest Service, University of Bristol, University of North Texas, ETH Zurich, and the Center for Materials Innovation, was published on the cover of Science in October 2021.
