= William Malbank, 1st Baron of Wich Malbank =

Anglo-Norman landowner

William Malbank
- Born: Circa 1050
- Died: Before 1109 (aged 58–59)
- Known for: Anglo-Norman baron
- Relatives: William Malbank, 3rd Baron of Wich Malbank - Grand child

William Malbank, 1st Baron of Wich Malbank (c.1050 – before 1109) was a baron who travelled to Nantwich in Cheshire, England, and built a castle there. He also founded the Hospital of St Nicholas there in 1083–84. He was the lord of Le Bény-Bocage in Calvados.

== Sources ==
- Hall J. A History of the Town and Parish of Nantwich, or Wich Malbank, in the County Palatine of Chester (2nd edn) (E. J. Morten; 1972) (ISBN 0-901598-24-0)
