= Nantwich Grammar School =

Former grammar school for girls and boys in Nantwich, Cheshire, England

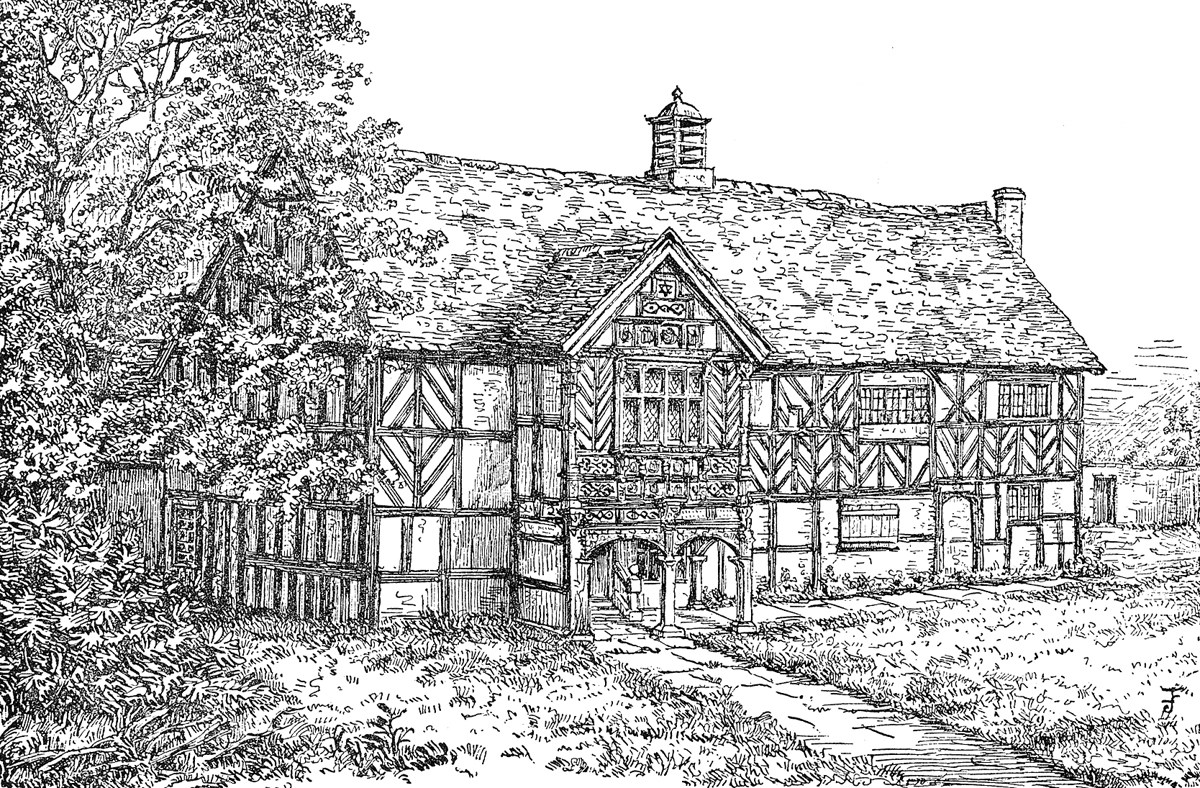
- Old grammar school

Information
- Established: c. 1560
- Closed: 1977 (became Malbank School and Sixth Form College)

Nantwich Grammar School, later known as Nantwich and Acton Grammar School, is a former grammar school for girls and boys in Nantwich, Cheshire, England. It now forms part of the mixed comprehensive school, Malbank School and Sixth Form College.

The original Nantwich Grammar School was first recorded in 1572 and occupied a schoolhouse in St Mary's churchyard. It closed in around 1858 and the building was demolished. In 1860, the New Grammar School was founded from the amalgamation of this school with the Blue Cap School, a charity school founded around 1700 which had closed in 1852. It occupied a large schoolhouse and headmaster's house at 108 Welsh Row. In 1885, it incorporated the grammar school of Acton, and became known as Nantwich and Acton Grammar School. The former schoolhouse and headmaster's house at 108 Welsh Row are listed as grade II; it has diapering, latticed windows and an octagonal bell tower.

The school moved to a new, larger building at the end of Welsh Row in 1921. In 1977, the school became comprehensive and was renamed Malbank School and Sixth Form College.

== Old Grammar School ==
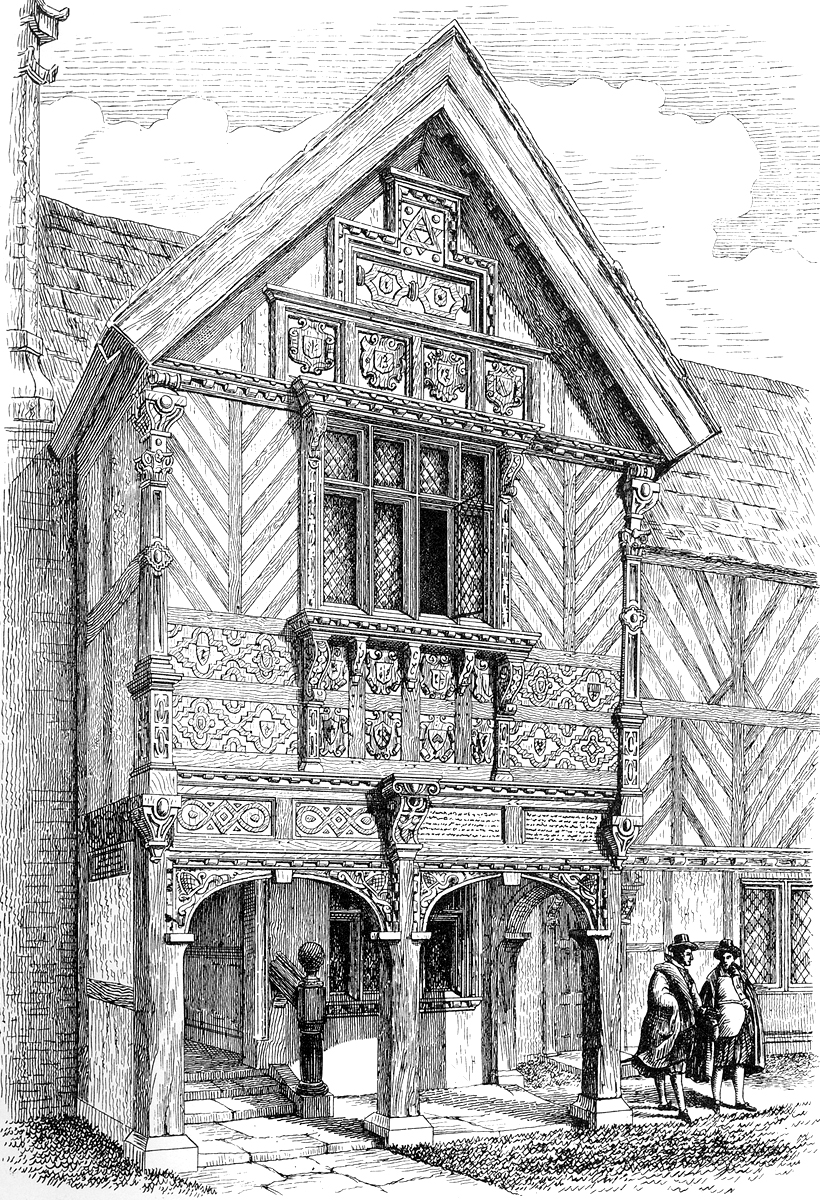
Porch of the Old Grammar School

The earliest grammar school in Nantwich is usually considered to have been founded in around 1560; the first record of it, however, dates from 1572. It was founded by two London woolpackers, John and Thomas Thrush, who originated in Nantwich. William Webb, writing in 1622–3, stated that the school's aim was to further the "teaching of the children of the poor and others". The Wilbraham family later became the main benefactor and, by 1716, they were nominating the school's masters. The timber-framed school building in the churchyard of St Mary's was formerly the town's guild hall. Like the adjacent church, the schoolhouse appears to have survived the fire of 1583; it is not listed among the buildings destroyed, and Webb states that the fire consumed "all the dwellings from the river-side to the other side of the church ... saving only the school-house". In 1611, Randle Kent, an early schoolmaster, had the existing building extended with the addition of a porch to the south face.

According to the Reverend William Walford, a pupil in the 1780s, subjects taught included Latin, Greek, writing and arithmetic. Walford described the tuition as "far from being of the highest order, as may be conceived, when one teacher had to instruct a hundred boys with no other assistance than that of an usher" and stated that pupils were frequently beaten. Until 1831, the schoolmaster was always a clergyman. In 1836, the Charity Commission recorded eight charity pupils, who received free education, nine boarders and fifty day pupils. The total annual endowment at this date amounted to £10 12s 0d, which was considered "very small". The 19th century saw the school experience problems recruiting a schoolmaster due to the low salary and the lack of a house, and the school closed in around 1858. The schoolhouse was demolished soon afterwards, when St Mary's was undergoing restoration.

== Blue Cap Charity School ==
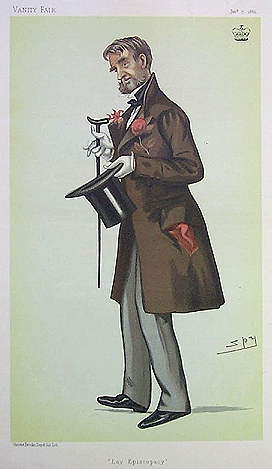
Vanity Fair caricature of Hungerford Crewe, a school benefactor

A Blue Cap School, a type of charity school, was founded in the town in the late 17th century or early 18th century. It is first mentioned in a pamphlet of 1712, which stated that the school taught forty boys "who wear blue caps that their behaviour may be the better observed abroad". There was a separate establishment for thirty girls, about which little is known. The school took boys from age eight. In general such charity schools taught reading, writing and arithmetic, and additionally prepared pupils for apprenticeships. However, Joseph Partridge, the schoolmaster in 1772–96 and author of the first history of Nantwich, mentioned only tuition in English and writing. The Nantwich Blue Cap School rented rooms from a house in Pepper Street, now demolished, and no specific schoolhouse was ever built.

The principal original donors were Randle and Stephen Wilbraham, and the Wilbraham family of Townsend House administered the school, selected the charity pupils and also paid for their clothing. Each charity boy received annually "a stout drab jacket, a blue cloth cap, a band, a pair of shoes and a pair of stockings". By 1774, John Crewe (later the first Baron Crewe) of Crewe Hall was also contributing to the master's salary, which was £16 in 1836. By 1836, in addition to the forty charity pupils, there were thirty paying pupils. The "old-fashioned and eccentric" John Thomson held the post of schoolmaster for 55 years from 1797 until 1851, when he retired aged 86 or 87. His successor lasted only around six months, and the school then closed.

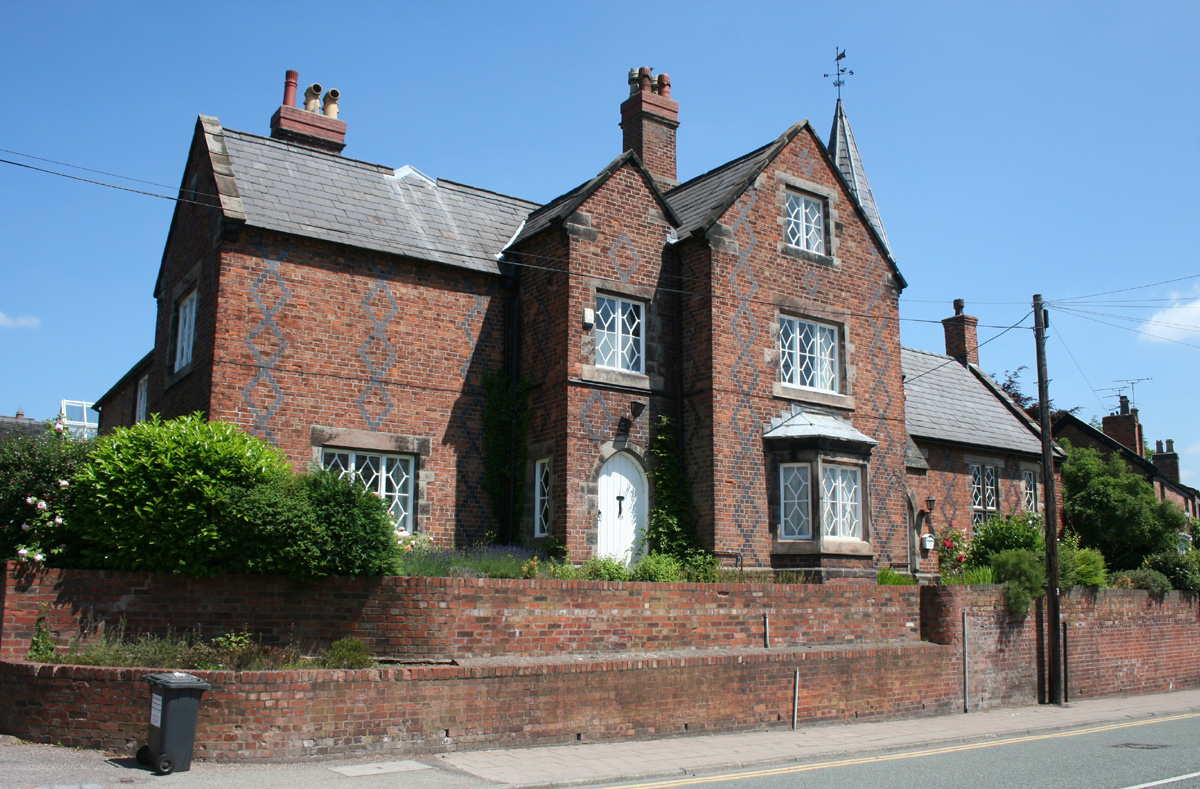
108 Welsh Row

== New Grammar School: 108 Welsh Row ==
=== History ===
The new grammar school and headmaster's house at 108 Welsh Row were built by George Wilbraham of Delamere to replace the closed grammar school in around 1860. The newly founded school amalgamated the charities of the Old Grammar School and the Blue Cap School, by a directive of the Court of Chancery dated 22 March 1860. George Wilbraham endowed it with £500 from the Old Grammar School fund and Hungerford Crewe, the third Baron Crewe, with £200 from the Blue Cap School fund. Six charity pupils, nominated by Wilbraham and Lord Crewe, were educated for free. The new schoolhouse was built at Welsh Row Head, which at that date was the end of the street.

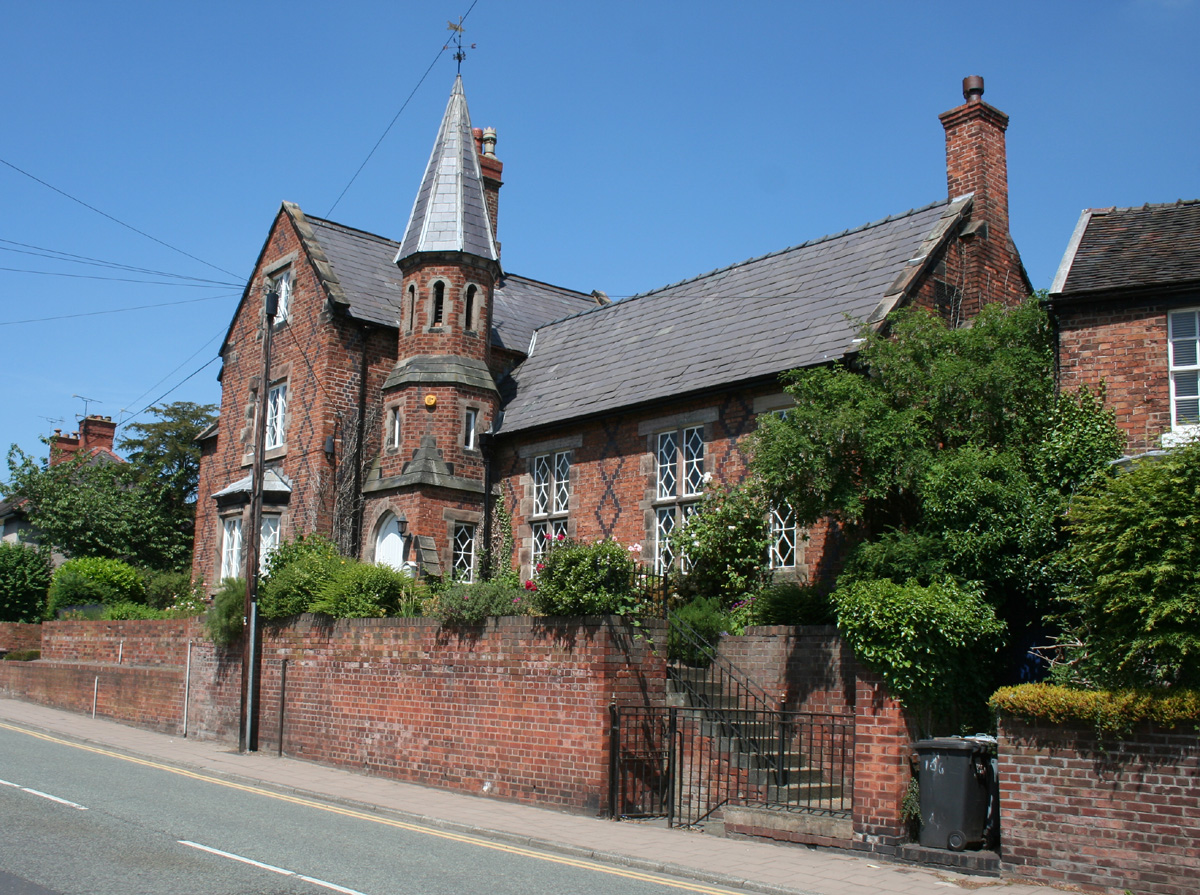
View showing bell tower and schoolroom (right)

In 1885, the school incorporated the grammar school of nearby Acton, founded in 1662, to become Nantwich and Acton Grammar School. At some point in the late 19th or early 20th century, the school started to admit girls. The town's population growth during the early 20th century rendered number 108 too small, and the combined school moved to a new, larger building at the end of Welsh Row in 1921.

=== Description ===
108 Welsh Row is a large building of two storeys plus attics, in red brick with stone dressing and blue-brick decorative diapering under a slate roof. It is listed at grade II. It has a projecting central wing with two gables; the larger of the two gables has a bay window. There is an octagonal bell tower capped with a spirelet. The former schoolroom is lower than the headmaster's house and has three bays.

All the windows are latticed with a lozenge pattern; the schoolroom windows have stone mullions and transoms. The two entrances to the front face have a pointed arched top. The building stood vacant in 1987, but has since been converted to residential use.

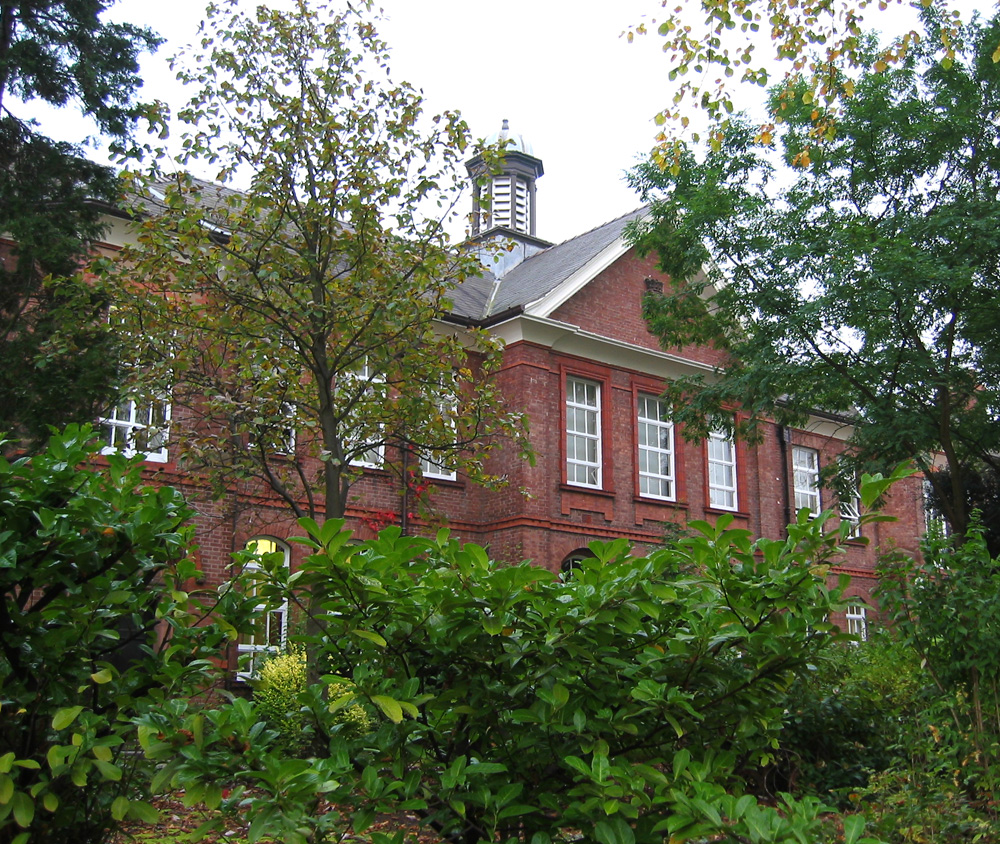
Malbank School

== Later history ==
In 1928, a few years after the move to the larger building, Nantwich and Acton Grammar School had expanded to 250 pupils. It remained a grammar school until 1977, when it became comprehensive and was renamed Malbank School and Sixth Form College.

== See also ==
- Listed buildings in Nantwich
