= Malbank School and Sixth Form College =

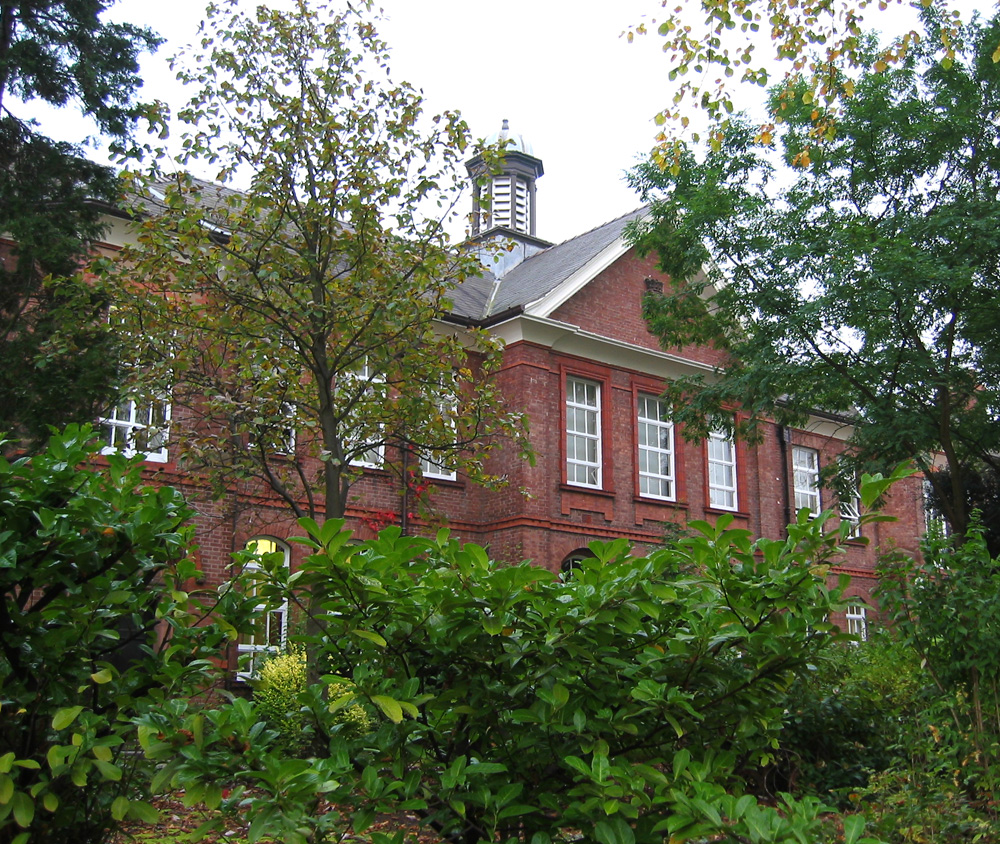

Location
- Welsh Row; Nantwich, Cheshire, CW5 5HD; England
- Coordinates: 53°04′10″N 2°32′03″W

Information
- Type: Foundation school
- Motto: Gaudeamus
- Established: 1560; 466 years ago
- Local authority: Cheshire East
- Department for Education URN: 152168 Tables
- Ofsted: Reports
- Headteacher: John Harrison
- Gender: Coeducational
- Age: 11 to 18
- Enrolment: 1324
- Former name: Nantwich and Acton Grammar School
- Website: malbank.com

Malbank School is a comprehensive secondary school and sixth form in Nantwich, Cheshire with pupils of both sexes aged from 11 to 18.

== Location ==
It is situated close to Nantwich's boundary with Henhull, on the north side of Welsh Row (part of the Nantwich-Chester road), and east of the Shropshire Union Canal.

== History ==
=== Grammar school ===
Malbank School originates in three schools. The oldest is the original Nantwich Grammar School, first recorded in 1572, but believed to have been founded in around 1560. The original schoolhouse was in the churchyard of St Mary's Church. In 1860 the school amalgamated with the Blue Cap Charity School, which was founded in around 1700, to form the new Nantwich Grammar School, and moved to 108 Welsh Row, where the former schoolhouse and headmaster's house still stands. In 1885, it combined with Acton Grammar School, becoming Nantwich and Acton Grammar School or NAGS. It moved to its present site in 1921 in buildings designed by Harry Beswick.

In 1960, the school celebrated its 400th anniversary, with the Duchess of Gloucester attending the school prize-giving on 18 November 1960. On the occasion, the Nantwich Guardian reported that the "school of ancient history had turned into one of the most up-to-date in the County, catering for all the widely varying needs of individual children."

=== Comprehensive ===
Nantwich and Acton Grammar School became a comprehensive school in 1977. The name later changed to Malbank School and Sixth Form College.

In 2010, the school celebrated its 450th anniversary with a full school ceremony and visit from the Duke of Gloucester on 26 April 2010.

In September 2011, the £1.2 million Olympic Boulevard building was opened, housing a health and fitness centre, conference facilities, cafeteria, Starbucks coffee and IT facilities widely used by the whole school. VIP guests at the opening included Bryony Page, Paralympics Committee chairman Sir Philip Craven and Paralympians Claire and Scott Robertson.

=== Sixth form ===
The Sixth Form, which has its own "building" within the school, takes applicants mainly from Crewe and Nantwich but also from the surrounding Cheshire area. Students will normally take three or four A-levels, occasionally two, and have the opportunity to undertake an Extended Project Qualification (EPQ). There are also BTEC courses which are intended to be taken with specific A-level choices.

== Notable former pupils ==
- Stephen Eichhorn, materials scientist
- Antony Jenkins, banker
- Hayley Jones (athlete), world medallist in athletics 4 × 100 m relay, 2013
- Ben Miller, comedian
- Bryony Page, trampoline silver medallist at 2016 Olympics, bronze medallist at 2020 Olympics and gold medallist at the 2024 Olympics.
- Sophie Reade, winner of Big Brother, 2009
- Ashley Westwood, footballer formerly at Crewe Alexandra, Aston Villa and Burnley, now at Charlotte FC

=== Nantwich and Acton Grammar School ===
- Alan Astbury, Professor of Physics at the University of Victoria (1983–2000), Rutherford Medal and Prize (1986), President of the International Union of Pure and Applied Physics (IUPAP; 2005–2008)
- Ian Cowap (1950–2016), cricketer
- Dame Maeve Fort, High Commissioner to South Africa (1996–2000), Ambassador to Mozambique (1989–1992) and to the Lebanese Republic (1992–1996)
- Sir Kenneth Mather, geneticist, Professor of Genetics at the University of Birmingham (1948–1965, 1971–1984), and Vice-Chancellor of the University of Southampton (1965–1971)
- Anthony Trickett, Lord Lieutenant of Orkney (2007-2013)
- Sir Andrew Witty, CEO of United Health Group since 2017 (school was comprehensive for his last five years)
- Mike Wood, Labour MP for Batley and Spen 1997–2015
