= Listed buildings in Faddiley =

Faddiley is a civil parish in Cheshire East, England. It contains twelve buildings that are recorded in the National Heritage List for England as designated listed buildings. Of these, one is listed at Grade I, the highest grade, one is listed at Grade II*, the middle grade, and the others are at Grade II. Apart from small settlements, the parish is rural, and most of the listed buildings are houses, cottages, and farm buildings. The other listed buildings are the remains of an ancient cross, a private chapel and its enclosure, and a public house.

== Key ==
Grade	Criteria
I	Buildings of exceptional interest, sometimes considered to be internationally important
II*	Particularly important buildings of more than special interest
II	Buildings of national importance and special interest

== Buildings ==
Name and location	Photograph	Date	Notes	Grade
Woodhey Cross; 53.06936°N 2.63228°W		Early 16th century (probable)	The remains of the cross are in red sandstone. They consist of a square shaft in a square base block, sitting on stone steps. The cross is also a scheduled monument.	II*
Barn, Woodhey Farm; 53.07055°N 2.64015°W		Early 17th century	The barn, which was remodelled in about 1870, is in brick with timber framing on a stone plinth, and has a tiled roof. The barn is in two storeys, and a front of four bays.	II
Botterleyhill; 53.06057°N 2.61167°W	—	Early 17th century	A farmhouse that was remodelled in the 19th century. It is in two storeys, and has a five-bay front. The right bay is timber-framed with brick nogging, and is gabled. The rest of the house is in brick, and the roof is slated. The porch is carried on octagonal timber posts, and the doorway is flanked by pilasters. The windows are casements.	II
Ivy Cottage; 53.06919°N 2.61212°W		Early 17th century	A timber-framed cottage with brick nogging and a slate roof. It is in a single storey with an attic. The original section is in two bays, and there are brick additions to the right and to the rear, giving it a T-shaped plan. The windows are lattice casements, those in the upper floor being in gabled dormers.	II
Stables, Woodhey Farm; 53.07076°N 2.63988°W		Early 17th century	The stables are built in red brick with diapering in blue brick. They stand on a stone plinth, and have a tiled roof. The building is in two storeys, with a front of five bays. There are four-light mullioned windows in both storeys.	II
Walled enclosure 53.07019°N 2.63804°W		Early 17th century	The enclosure is to the south of Woodhey Chapel, and originally enclosed a garden of the former Woodhey Hall. It is in brick with stone dressings on a stone plinth.	II
Tollemache Arms (now The Thatch); 53.07274°N 2.61234°W		Late 17th century	Originating as a house, and later a public house, it is timber-framed with brick nogging on a stone plinth. The building is in three sections. The section to the left is in two storeys with a slate roof, the middle section, which is probably the oldest, is in a single storey with an attic, and the right section has a single storey; the latter two sections are thatched. The windows are casements, that in the middle section being in a dormer.	II
Woodhey Chapel; 53.07062°N 2.63827°W		c. 1700	This was built for Lady Wilbraham as a private chapel for Woodhey Hall, since demolished. It is built in brick with stone dressings and has a slate roof, and is attached on the west side to a 17th-century loggia that provided an entrance from the hall. On the south face are three round-headed windows, and a doorway with a circular window above. Inside the chapel are a gallery, box pews, and a pedimented reredos.	I
Dragon's Cottage; 53.07221°N 2.61240°W		Early 18th century	A timber-framed cottage with brick nogging and an asbestos-cement slate roof. It was originally in a single storey with an attic, and a second storey has been added. Some timbers have been replaced by brickwork. The windows are casements, and the gables have bargeboards.	II
Fingerpost Farmhouse; 53.07132°N 2.62758°W	—	Early 18th century	A timber-framed farmhouse with brick nogging and a slate roof. It is in a single storey with an attic and has a three-bay front. There are brick extensions on the left and at the rear. The windows are casements, those in the upper floor being in gabled dormers.	II
Retaining wall 53.07070°N 2.63898°W	—	Early 18th century	The wall is in sandstone on a projecting plinth. It supports a ramped grass area leading to the loggia at the west side of Woodhey Chapel.	II
Woodhey Hall Farmhouse; 53.07137°N 2.64027°W		c. 1870	The farmhouse was built as part of the Peckforton Estate. It is in brick on a sandstone plinth with a tiled roof, and has two storeys and an attic. The front is in four bays, including a gable. Its features include windows with octagonal glazing, timbered gables and dormers, and tall clustered chimneys.	II

== See also ==
- Listed buildings in Baddiley
- Listed buildings in Brindley
- Listed buildings in Burland
- Listed buildings in Cholmondeley
- Listed buildings in Chorley
- Listed buildings in Ridley
- Listed buildings in Spurstow
