= Woodhey =

Woodhey or Woodheys may refer to:

- Woodhey, an area of Bebington, Merseyside,
- Woodhey or Woodhey Green, a small settlement in the Faddiley civil parish of Cheshire,
- Woodhey Chapel, Faddiley, a private chapel in Cheshire,
- Woodhey Cross, an ancient stone cross in Cheshire,
- Woodhey High School, a secondary school in Ramsbottom, in the Metropolitan Borough of Bury, Greater Manchester.
- Woodheys Primary School, a primary school in Sale, Trafford, Greater Manchester
- Woodheys Park, a park next to the Woodheys Estate in Sale Greater Manchester
