= Listed buildings in Edleston =

Edleston is a former civil parish in Cheshire East, England. It contained six buildings that are recorded in the National Heritage List for England as designated listed buildings, all of which are at Grade II. This grade is the lowest of the three gradings given to listed buildings and is applied to "buildings of national importance and special interest". The parish was entirely rural. The Shropshire Union Canal passed through the parish, and there are three listed structures associated with this, two accommodation bridges and a milepost. The other listed buildings are cottages and a farmhouse.

Name and location	Photograph	Date	Notes
Broomfield Cottage and Newbury Cottage; 53.05423°N 2.55883°W	—	Mid-17th century	A pair of cottages built partly in rendered brick, and partly timber-framed with brick nogging. The roofs, formerly thatched, are now tiled or covered in corrugated metal. They are in a single storey with an attic, and have a front of three bays, with a 20th-century extension. The upper windows are in gables and dormers. Inside is an inglenook.
Moss Cottage; 53.05842°N 2.54747°W		Early 18th century	A timber-framed cottage on a brick plinth, formerly a farmhouse, with brick nogging and a tiled roof. It is in two storeys with an attic. The windows are casements, one of which is in a single gabled dormer.
Canal milepost 53.06006°N 2.53723°W		Early 19th century	The milepost is in cast iron and consists of a circular post with a domed post. The plate is divided into three panels inscribed with the distances in miles to Nantwich, Autherley Junction, and Norbury Junction.
Edleston Bridge; 53.05251°N 2.54085°W		c. 1826	This is bridge no. 89, an accommodation bridge, over the Shropshire Union Canal. It is built in brick with stonework, and consists of a single elliptical arch. The approach walls end in piers with four-way rounded caps. On the angles of the arch are cast iron rubbing posts.
Green Lane Bridge; 53.05810°N 2.53875°W		c. 1826	This is bridge no. 90, an accommodation bridge carrying Green Lane over the Shropshire Union Canal. It is built in brick with stonework, and consists of a single skew elliptical arch. The approach walls end in piers with four-way rounded caps. On the angles of the arch are cast iron rubbing posts.
Edleston Farmhouse; 53.05505°N 2.55458°W	—	c. 1870	The farmhouse was built as part of the Peckforton Estate. It is in brick with a tiled roof, is in two storeys with an attic, and has a front of three bays. The farmhouse has a southeast wing, giving it an L-shaped plan. At the front is a brick porch with a timber gable and a finial. The windows are casements with lattice glazing, those in the attic are in gabled dormers with finials.

== See also ==
- Listed buildings in Acton
- Listed buildings in Baddington
- Listed buildings in Burland
- Listed buildings in Nantwich
- Listed buildings in Sound
