= Listed buildings in Acton, Cheshire =

Acton is a former civil parish in Cheshire East, England. It contained 24 buildings that are recorded in the National Heritage List for England as designated listed buildings. Of these, two are listed at Grade I, the highest grade, four are listed at Grade II*, the middle grade, and the others are at Grade II. Apart from the village of Acton, the parish was rural. Listed buildings in the village include the church and associated structures, houses, a public house and a telephone kiosk. The major structure is the parish is Dorfold Hall; this and associated structures are listed. The other items include an aqueduct carrying the Shropshire Union Canal across a road, farmhouses and cottages.

== Key ==
Grade	Criteria
I	Buildings of exceptional interest, sometimes considered to be internationally important
II*	Particularly important buildings of more than special interest
II	Buildings of national importance and special interest

== Buildings ==
Name and location	Photograph	Date	Notes	Grade
St Mary's Church; 53.0737°N 2.5512°W		c. 1180	The oldest surviving structure of the church is the lower part of the tower, most of the rest dating from the 14th and 15th centuries. The church was restored in the 17th and 18th centuries, and there was a major restoration in 1897–98 by Austin and Paley. The church is built in sandstone with lead roofs. It consists of a nave with aisles, a chancel with a north vestry, and a west tower. At the east end of the north aisle is the Mainwaring Chapel, and to the north of the tower is the Dorfold chantry.	I
Dorfold Hall; 53.0737°N 2.5512°W		1616	Dorfold Hall was built as a mansion for the lawyer Sir Roger Wilbraham. It is in Jacobean style, and is constructed in red brick with blue brick diapering, stone dressings, and a slate roof. The house is in two storeys with a basement and attic, and has a front of six bays, with an added bay to the east. It has a double-pile plan, and is flanked by L-shaped pavilions and screen walls dated 1824. At the top of the house are gables and balustrades. Most of the windows are mullioned and transomed.	I
Almshouses; 53.07411°N 2.55133°W		Early 17th century	A pair of former almshouses, built in brick with stone dressings and a tiled roof. They are in a single storey with an attic, and each house has two bays. The quoins and door surrounds are rusticated. The windows either have one light or are mullioned, and they contain casements.	II
Gate in wall, Dorfold Hall; 53.06870°N 2.54578°W		Early 17th century	Originating from an almshouse in Nantwich, the gate was moved here in 1872, and set as a feature in a wall to the west of the hall. The gate is in wrought iron decorated with a central sun feature and scrolls. It is mounted in a stone archway with a pedimented canopy. This is flanked by niches containing busts of Elizabeth I and a male courtier. Above the niches are cornices supporting heraldic lions.	II*
Cuckoo Cottage; 53.07962°N 2.56088°W	—	Late 17th century	A pair of cottages, timber-framed with brick nogging and some brick work, and a thatched roof. They are in a single storey with an attic, and have a four-bay front. The first bay projects forward and is gabled, forming a cross-wing. The windows are casements, those in the upper floor being in gabled dormers.	II
Dorfold Dairy House; 53.06307°N 2.55044°W		Late 17th century	This originated as the home farmhouse to Dorfold Hall, and was later converted into a private house. It is built in brick, and has a roof partly tiled and partly slated. The house has a U-shaped plan, is in three storeys with an attic, and has fronts of three bays. The windows are casements. Inside the house some of the 17th-century fittings have been retained.	II*
Star Inn; 53.07272°N 2.55034°W		Late 17th century	A public house, with later alterations. Parts are timber-framed, others are in plastered brick with attached timber. It has a tiled roof, is in two storeys, and has a three-bay front. The windows are casements. At the front is an old stone mounting block.	II
Sundial; 53.07373°N 2.55048°W		Late 17th century	The sundial stands in the churchyard of St Mary's Church. It is over 12 feet (3.7 m) high, and possibly incorporates part of a medieval cross shaft. It is in sandstone, the octagonal cross shaft standing on a block on a three-step base. On its top is a cube with wrought iron pointers on all four sides. This is surmounted by a ball finial. The structure is also a scheduled monument.	II
Glebe House; 53.07381°N 2.55223°W		1727	This originated as the vicarage, and later became a private house. It is built in brick with a tiled roof, is in three storeys, and has a five-bay front. The windows are sashes, and at the top of the house is a cornice. On the gable ends are massive chimney stacks with six separate flues.	II*
Old Farmhouse; 53.07310°N 2.55048°W	—	Mid-18th century	A brick house and service wing with a tiled roof, forming an L-shaped plan. It is partly in three storeys, and partly in two. In the house are retained elements of timber-framing.	II
Farm building, Dorfold Dairy House; 53.06325°N 2.55092°W		Late 18th century	This originated as a shippon with a loft. It is built in brick with a slate roof, it is in three storeys, and has a four-bay front. The building contains a large carriageway opening, pitch holes, and ventilation holes in cross and diamond patterns.	II
Madam's Farm House; 53.06947°N 2.56107°W		Late 18th century	This originated as the dower house of the Dorfold Estate, and later became a private house. It is built in brick, and has a slate roof. The house has a T-shaped plan, is in three storeys, and has a three-bay front. The stone doorcase has Doric columns, triglyph imposts, and an open pediment. The windows are sashes.	II
Ice house, Dorfold Hall; 53.06948°N 2.54256°W	—	Late 18th century (probable)	The ice house stands in the grounds of the hall, and is built in brick under a mound of earth. It is entered by a narrow sloping brick passage and steps leading down into the chamber. The chamber is circular, and has a vaulted roof.	II
Gate in walled garden, Dorfold Hall; 53.06833°N 2.54565°W	—	c. 1824	The gateway gives access from the hall to the walled garden. The gate is in wrought iron, and the gate piers are in brick with stone dressings. The piers are square and have caps carrying stone eagles. Above the gate is a decorative overthrow.	II
Church Farm House; 53.07419°N 2.55076°W		Early 19th century	A brick house with a slate roof, it is in two storeys, and has a three-bay front. At the rear are two wings, giving it an F-shaped plan. The doorcase has panelled pilasters, an open pediment, and a fanlight. The windows are sashes, other than those in the gables, which are casements.	II
Cottage; 53.08092°N 2.55514°W	—	Early 19th century	A red brick cottage with an L-shaped plan. The main block is tiled, and the rear wing has a slate roof. It is in two storeys, and has a two-bay front. The windows are casements.	II
Star Cottages; 53.07260°N 2.55033°W		Early 19th century	A pair of brick cottages with a tiled roof. They are in a single storey with an attic, and each cottage has a single-bay front. Flanking each cottage is a gabled porch, with a Tudor-arched doorway and bargeboards. The windows are casements, those in the upper floor being in gabled half-dormers.	II
Nantwich Aqueduct; 53.06924°N 2.53571°W		c. 1826	The aqueduct carries the Shropshire Union Canal over the Chester to Nantwich road. The consulting engineer was Thomas Telford. It has a cast iron trough carried between stone-dressed brick abutments. Crossing the road is a segmental arch, with a cast iron balustrade above it.	II*
Lodge and entrance gates, Dorfold Hall; 53.07072°N 2.54587°W		1862	The lodge is in Jacobean style, and is constructed in red brick with stone dressings and a slate roof. It is in a single storey, and has fronts of two bays. At the top of the lodge is a moulded parapet with ogee-shaped gables and ball finials. Running from the lodge to the east is a brick diapered wall surmounted by a cast iron and stone balustrade with ball finials. The wall incorporates stone piers, double carriage gates, and a single pedestrian gate with an overthrow.	II
Garden wall, Dorfold Hall; 53.06823°N 2.54501°W		1862 (probable)	The wall is in the garden to the south of the house where the lawns change in level. It is in sandstone with a moulded plinth and an overhanging coping. At the east end of the wall six steps lead down to the lower lawn; these are flanked by a stepped balustrade.	II
Carriage house with clock tower, Dorfold Hall; 53.06870°N 2.54559°W		c. 1862	Constructed in red brick with a slate roof, this consists of a two-storey carriage house and a clock tower. In the ground floor is a large doorway, above which is a lunette with a keystone. In the upper floor is a two-light mullioned window. The clock tower contains louvred openings and clock faces on all sides. At its top is a tall wooden finial, a metal flag, and a weathervane.	II
Statue group, Dorfold Hall; 53.06872°N 2.54522°W		c. 1862	The statues are in the forecourt of the hall. They are in iron and stand on an oval stone base. The statues depict a female dog with one foot upsetting a feeding bowl, standing over three puppies.	II
Churchyard wall 53.07397°N 2.55048°W		1897	This was probably the restoration of an earlier wall. It is in red sandstone, and forms the boundary to the churchyard of St Mary's Church. The wall is only one or two courses high. There are piers at the openings in the wall, and it is topped by slightly overhanging coping.	II
Telephone kiosk 53.07367°N 2.55022°W		1935	A K6 type telephone kiosk, designed by Giles Gilbert Scott. Constructed in cast iron with a square plan and a dome, it has three unperforated crowns in the top panels.	II

== See also ==
- Listed buildings in Burland
- Listed buildings in Edleston
- Listed buildings in Henhull
- Listed buildings in Hurleston
- Listed buildings in Nantwich
