= Listed buildings in Brindley =

Brindley is a civil parish in Cheshire East, England. It contains three buildings that are recorded in the National Heritage List for England as designated listed buildings, all of which are at Grade II. This grade is the lowest of the three gradings given to listed buildings and is applied to "buildings of national importance and special interest". The parish is almost entirely rural, and the listed buildings consist of two cottages and a farmhouse.

Name and location	Photograph	Date	Notes
Radbrook Cottage; 53.09201°N 2.60619°W		1617	The cottage is timber framed with brick nogging, and has a slate roof. It is in a single storey with an attic, and has a four-bay front. In the centre is a gabled half-dormer. At the rear is an added 20th-century wing.
The Cottage; 53.07433°N 2.60785°W	—	Late 17th century	Originally two cottages, this has been converted into one dwelling. It is timber-framed with a slate roof, and is in a single storey with an attic. It has a three-bay front, and contains a gabled half-dormer with bargeboards. The windows are casements.
Brindley Lea Hall; 53.07744°N 2.61306°W		c. 1860	A brick farmhouse on a stone plinth with a tiled roof. It is in two storeys with an attic, and has a three-bay front. In the centre is a gabled porch. Most of the windows have three lights, and contain cast iron glazing in the form of hexagonal lozenges. The windows in the upper floor are in gabled dormers with finials. There are two further wings at the rear.

== See also ==
- Listed buildings in Spurstow
- Listed buildings in Haughton
- Listed buildings in Hurleston
- Listed buildings in Burland
- Listed buildings in Faddiley
