= Listed buildings in Hurleston =

Hurleston is a former civil parish in Cheshire East, England. It contained eight buildings that are recorded in the National Heritage List for England as designated listed buildings, all of which are at Grade II. This grade is the lowest of the three gradings given to listed buildings and is applied to "buildings of national importance and special interest". The parish was entirely rural, its main feature being the junction of the Shropshire Union Canal and the Llangollen Canal, the Hurleston Junction, and in particular the system of locks at the east end of the Llangollen Canal. Of the eight listed buildings, six are associated with the canal system, four locks and two bridges. The other listed buildings are a farmhouse and one of its farm buildings.

Name and location	Photograph	Date	Notes
Bache House Farmhouse; 53.08999°N 2.57658°W		17th century	The farmhouse is in brick, partly pebbledashed, and has a slate roof. It is in two storeys with an attic. It has a four-bay front, and three bays down the side, giving it an L-shaped plan. On the side is a doorcase with fluted pilasters and a cornice. The gables have bargeboards, and the windows are casements. The house contains a former cheese room.
Bache House Bridge; 53.08944°N 2.57285°W		c. 1805	This is bridge No. 2, an accommodation bridge over the Llangollen Canal. It was designed by J. Fletcher with Thomas Telford as the consultant. The bridge is constructed in engineering bricks, and consists of a single semicircular arch with splayed abutments. It has a humped carriageway, rounded stone copings, and piers with four-way rounded caps.
Hurleston Bridge No. 1; 53.09165°N 2.56758°W		c. 1805	The bridge carried a road over the Llangollen Canal. It was designed by J. Fletcher with Thomas Telford as the consultant. The bridge is constructed in engineering bricks, and consists of a single semicircular arch with splayed abutments. The approach parapets are also splayed, and have rounded stone copings and piers with four-way rounded caps.
Hurleston Lock No. 1; 53.09366°N 2.56057°W		c. 1805	The lock was designed by J. Fletcher with Thomas Telford as the consultant. It is built in engineering bricks, and has some dressings in sandstone and in concrete. At the upper end is a single wooden gate, and at the lower end is a pair of metal gates dated 1974.
Hurleston Lock No. 2; 53.09320°N 2.56224°W		c. 1805	The lock was designed by J. Fletcher with Thomas Telford as the consultant. It is built in engineering bricks, and has some dressings in sandstone and in concrete. At the upper end is a single metal gate, and at the lower end is a pair of metal gates, both of which are dated 1974.
Hurleston Lock No. 3; 53.09289°N 2.56332°W		c. 1805	The lock was designed by J. Fletcher with Thomas Telford as the consultant. It is built in engineering bricks, and has some dressings in sandstone and in concrete. At the upper end is a single metal gate, and at the lower end is a pair of wooden gates.
Hurleston Lock No. 4; 53.09259°N 2.56436°W		c. 1805	The lock was designed by J. Fletcher with Thomas Telford as the consultant. It is built in engineering bricks, and has some dressings in sandstone. At the upper end is a single metal gate, and at the lower end is a pair of wooden gates.
Farm building, Bache House Farm; 53.09042°N 2.57653°W		Early 19th century	The farm building consists of a shippon with a hay loft above. It is in brick with a slate roof, and is in two storeys. The building has an eleven-bay front, the three central bays projecting forward and forming and entrance with doorways. The lateral bays also contain doorways, and have hopper lights, rectangular pitch holes, and ventilation holes in a "X" pattern.

== See also ==
- Listed buildings in Acton
- Listed buildings in Brindley
- Listed buildings in Burland
- Listed buildings in Haughton
- Listed buildings in Henhull
- Listed buildings in Poole
- Listed buildings in Stoke
- Listed buildings in Worleston
