= Listed buildings in Haughton, Cheshire =

Haughton is a civil parish in Cheshire East, England. It contains ten buildings that are recorded in the National Heritage List for England as designated listed buildings, all of which are at Grade II. This grade is the lowest of the three gradings given to listed buildings and is applied to "buildings of national importance and special interest". Apart from the village of Haughton, the parish is entirely rural. The listed buildings consist of houses and farms, and structures associated with them, and a public house. Four of the buildings date from the 17th century, and contain timber framing.

Name and location	Photograph	Date	Notes
Green Cottage; 53.10484°N 2.62160°W		Early 17th century	The cottage has been enlarged. The original part is timber-framed with brick nogging and a slate roof. It is in two storeys and has a four-bay front. The windows are mullioned, and there are two small hexagonal bay windows. The windows in the upper storey are gabled, two of them in half-dormers, and all with bargeboards and finials.
Barn, Haughton Thorn; 53.10035°N 2.62907°W		Late 17th century	A timber-framed barn on a sandstone plinth with brick nogging, some weatherboarding, and a formerly thatched roof, now tiled. It has gables with bargeboards.
Ivy Cottage; 53.10502°N 2.63447°W		Late 17th century	A timber-framed cottage with brick nogging on a sandstone plinth, and with a slate roof. There is a later brick wing to the east. The cottage is in a single storey with an attic. The windows are casements.
Nag's Head; 53.10038°N 2.62854°W		Late 17th century	A public house mainly in roughcast and stuccoed brick with applied timber, and with a timber-framed wing on a stone plinth. The wing is in a single storey with one, and the rest is in two storeys with three bays. There is a timber-framed gabled porch. The windows are casements.
Oak Farmhouse; 53.09978°N 2.62772°W		c. 1860	A brick farmhouse with a tiled roof. It is in two storeys and has a three-bay front. There is a gabled porch with a finial. The windows are casements with lozenge glazing, those in the upper floor are in gabled dormers with finials.
Farm buildings, Oak Farm; 53.09959°N 2.62729°W		c. 1860	The farm buildings are in brick with tiled roofs. They are in two storeys and have an L-shaped plan, with ranges of five and seven bays. The features include half-heck and full doors, hopper lights, and circular pitch holes.
Haughton Hall; 53.10334°N 2.61719°W		1891	This is a rebuilt country house designed by J. F. Doyle. It was altered in about 1950, reducing it from three storeys to two. The house is built in pebbledashed brick with a tiled roof, and it has an L-shaped plan. It has a five-bay garden front, a single-storey four-bay east wing, and a three-storey three-bay west service wing. Its features include three bay windows, a Venetian window, and a sundial over the door on the garden front.
Gates and gate piers, Haughton Hall; 53.10382°N 2.62024°W		c. 1891	The gate piers are in sandstone and are in a rectangular plan that is set diagonally. The top stone on each side has carved decoration, and on the top is a ball finial. The gates are in cast iron and are elaborately decorated. Above the gates is an elaborate overthrow.
Lodge, Haughton Hall; 53.10378°N 2.62039°W		c. 1891	The lodge is built in sandstone, with timber-framing and plastered infill above. It is in a single storey with an attic. There are two bays on the entrance front and one on the side; on both fronts there are jettied gables. The windows are mullioned, and the brick chimney stacks are decorated with chevrons and spirals.
Outbuildings, Haughton Hall; 53.10335°N 2.61657°W		1894	The outbuildings form a quadrangle that is attached to the hall. They are in brick with some tile-hanging, and a tiled roof. They are mainly in two storeys. The features include Tudor arched gateways, a clock, an open loggia, mullioned windows, a dovecote with a pagoda-like roof, dormers, finials, and weathervanes.

== See also ==
- Listed buildings in Brindley
- Listed buildings in Bunbury
- Listed buildings in Hurleston
- Listed buildings in Spurstow
- Listed buildings in Stoke
- Listed buildings in Wardle
