= St Andrew's Church, Weston-under-Lizard =

Coordinates: 52.6932°N 2.2883°W

Church of St Andrew, Weston-under-Lizard
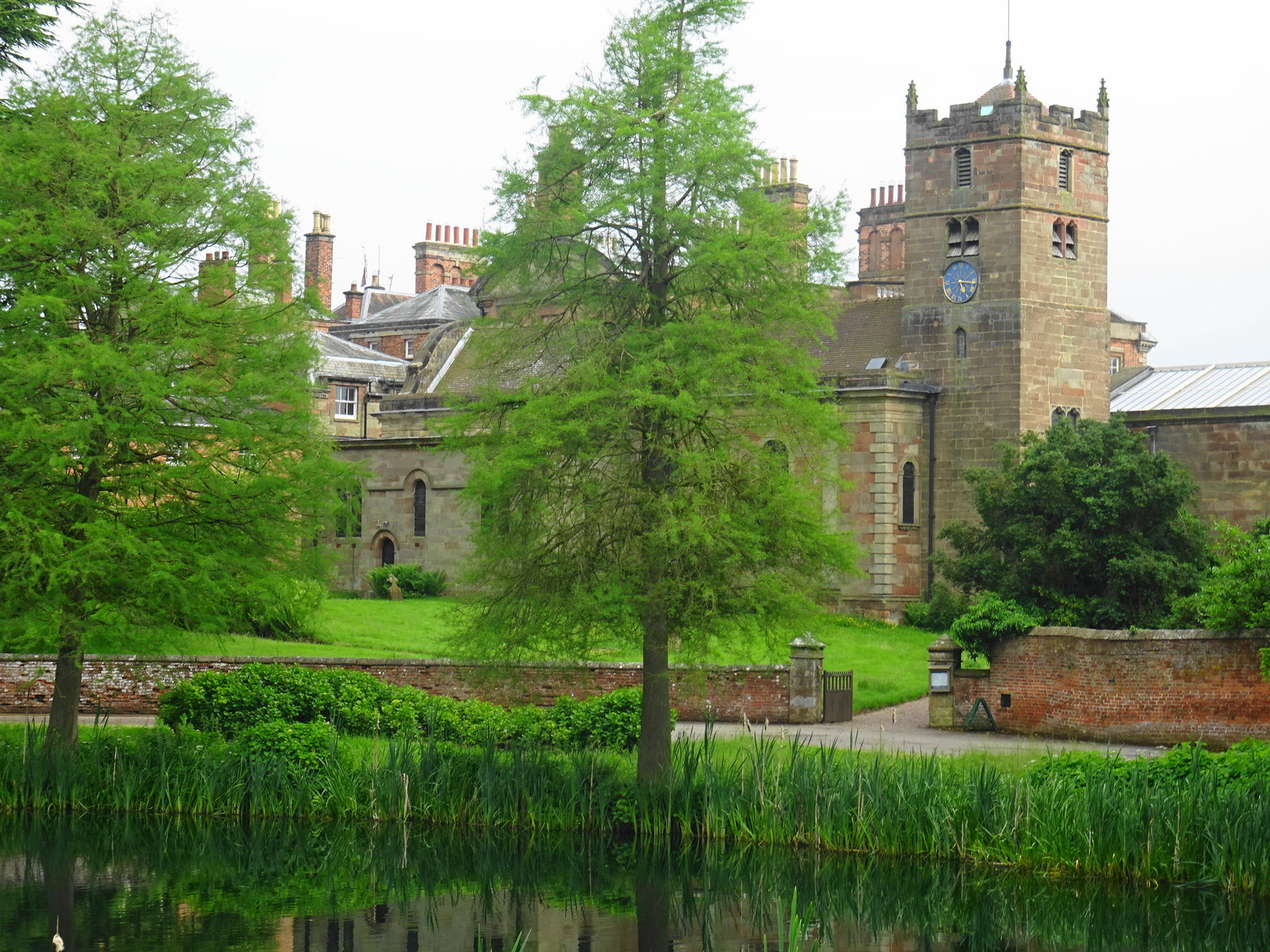

- Location in Staffordshire
- OS grid reference: SJ 80612 10649
- Location: Weston-under-Lizard, Staffordshire
- Country: England
- Denomination: Church of England

History
- Dedication: Saint Andrew

Architecture
- Heritage designation: Grade I
- Designated: 19 March 1962
- Architect(s): Elizabeth Wilbraham, George Edmund Street, Ewan Christian
- Completed: Medieval, with 18th and 19th century restorations

Administration
- Diocese: Diocese of Lichfield
- Deanery: Penkridge

Clergy
- Priest: The Revd Rachel Elizabeth Dale

The Church of St Andrew, Weston-under-Lizard, Staffordshire is a Grade I listed Anglican church. Its origins are medieval, but it was largely rebuilt in the very early 18th century by Elizabeth Wilbraham of Weston Park, and restored in the 19th century, firstly by George Edmund Street and then by Ewan Christian. It remains a functioning parish church in the Diocese of Lichfield.

== History ==
Historic England records the foundation of the church as medieval. Pevsner describes the church as "an enterprise of Lady Wilbraham...[of] 1700–1". This was Elizabeth Mytton, heiress of the Weston estate, who married Sir Thomas Wilbraham in 1651. A 2010 article in the Architects' Journal by the historian John Millar, describes Elizabeth Wilbraham as "the first woman architect", and suggests that she may have undertaken designs for over 350 buildings, as well as tutoring and collaborating with Christopher Wren. Prevented by the conventions of the time for identifying as an architect, and from taking any public role in construction, Millar suggests that buildings attributed to architects such as Hugh May, Roger Pratt and William Winde, were in fact designed by Wilbraham, with the named architects acting as surveyors to carry out her plans. Millar's views are not universally accepted, and his planned book on Wilbraham has yet to be published. It is generally accepted that Wilbraham undertook designs for a number of buildings for family and friends, including her own home, Weston Park, and the estate Church of St Andrew. (Note: Although Pevsner, and others, attribute the design of Weston Park to Elizabeth Wilbraham, even this is not universally accepted. The house's own website credits William Taylor, a London-based architect, while acknowledging Wilbraham as a "very interested patron".)

St Andrew's continues as a functioning church in the Diocese of Lichfield.

== Architecture and description ==
Pevsner records that "only the east wall with a 14th century window" remained of the medieval church when Elizabeth Wilbraham begun her reconstruction in 1700. The tower and nave are her work. The tower is of five stages, with a castellated final stage. Historic England describes the nave as "provincial Baroque". George Edmund Street undertook a restoration in around 1869, and the font is his. Further work, including the construction of a family chapel, was done by Ewan Christian in 1876–1877. The chapel, and the church, contain monuments to the Earls of Bradford and their families, who owned Weston Park until 1986.

== See also ==
- Listed buildings in Blymhill and Weston-under-Lizard

== Sources ==
- Pevsner, Nikolaus (1974). Staffordshire. Buildings of England. London, UK: Penguin Books. ISBN 0-14-071046-9.
