= Brindley =

Village in Cheshire, England

Coordinates: 53.076423°N 2.608345°W

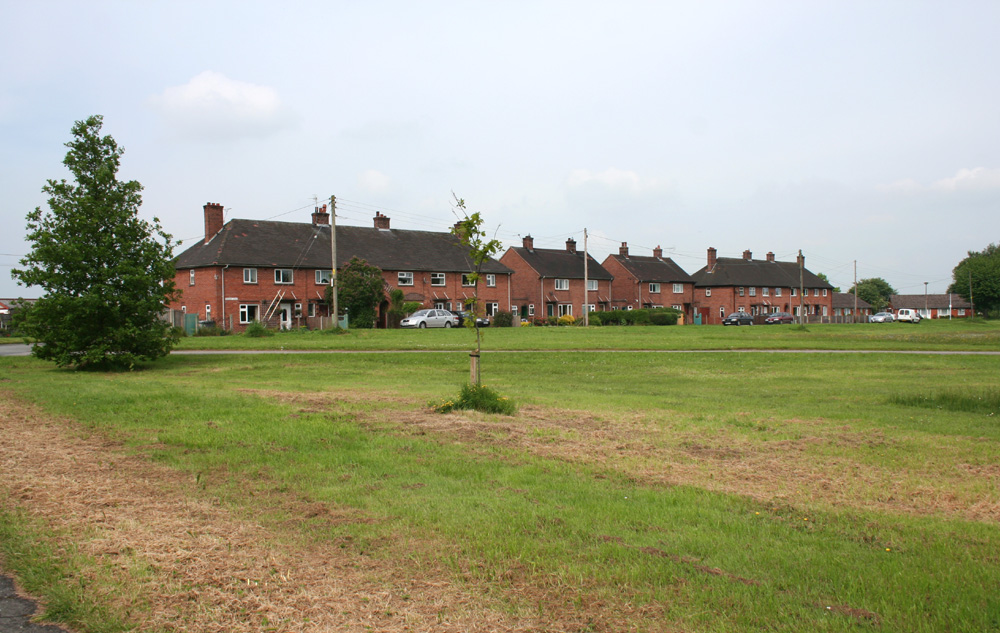
- Brindley village green

- Location within Cheshire
- Population: 155 (2011)
- OS grid reference: SJ592534
- Civil parish: Brindley
- Unitary authority: Cheshire East
- Ceremonial county: Cheshire
- Region: North West
- Country: England
- Sovereign state: United Kingdom
- Post town: NANTWICH
- Postcode district: CW5
- Dialling code: 01270
- UK Parliament: Chester South and Eddisbury

Brindley is a village (at SJ592534) and civil parish in Cheshire, England. The village lies 3¾ miles to the west of Nantwich. The parish also includes the settlements of Brindley Lea, Ryders Bank and part of Radmore Green, with a total population of about 150. Nearby villages include Barbridge, Burland, Haughton and Faddiley.

== History ==
The name Brindley means "a burnt clearing". The township does not appear in the Domesday survey, the first mention of Brindley being in 1288. Brindley fell within the ancient parish of Acton and was once part of the manor of Baddiley. Landowners included Willis Allen in 1656, Sir Thomas Mainwaring and Sir Thomas Brereton in 1671, and the Wilbraham and Tomkinson families from 1798.

Medieval landowners

In medieval times Brindley township and the Norman landowners that took its name were called Burndelegh, Birnedelegh, Burendeleg, Brundelegh, Brundeley, Brundylegh and later in Tudor times until the 18th century, 'Brundley', eventually evolving to the modern Brindley.

Earlier, in c.1272 a marriage was arranged to unite two Norman families. Gilbert de Stoke, son of Randle (Ranulphus) de Praers, was betrothed to Isolda de Brereton, daughter of Sir Ralph Brereton. As part of Isolda's marriage settlement, land at Brundelegh (Brindley), was given to Gilbert. Their first son decided to call himself Brundelegh de Brundeley (Brindley) after the land that he had inherited.

In 1288, Philip Russell sued William de Bulkelegh, Richard de Burndelegh and William, son of Matilda de Stok, in a trespass case. This also ended up including 'Birndelegh', when Richard the clerk of that place failed to prosecute William de Spurstow that same year. The same source – The County Court Rolls – also stated that the Burland family had lands in Burndelegh.

On 10 November 1361, Edward, Earl of Chester, granted the office of Constable of Beeston Castle (less than 6 miles from Brindley) to John de Brundelegh, with a salary: £4 a year and receiver of St. Pierre lands of which Brindley was a part, and also turf from Peckforton Moss (income from a valuable fuel). The orders included to reside in the castle. Edward, Earl of Chester in 1361, was the son of Edward III and was also Prince of Wales, famously known as the Black Prince.

In common with much of the surrounding area, the village was occupied by Royalist forces as they advanced on Nantwich in December 1643 during the Civil War.

The civil parish was enlarged from 1,090 acres (4.4 km^{2}) to 1,250 acres (5.1 km^{2}) in a series of boundary changes between 1871 and 1891.

== Governance ==
Since 1967, Brindley has been administered by the Brindley and Faddiley Parish Council, jointly with the adjacent civil parish of Faddiley. From 1974 the civil parish was served by Crewe and Nantwich Borough Council, which was succeeded on 1 April 2009 by the new unitary authority of Cheshire East. Brindley falls in the parliamentary constituency of Chester South and Eddisbury, which has been represented since the 2024 general election by Aphra Brandreth of the Conservative Party. It was previously part of the Eddisbury constituency, which since its establishment in 1983 had been held by the Conservative MPs Alastair Goodlad (1983–99), Stephen O'Brien (1999–2015), Antoinette Sandbach (2015–19) and Edward Timpson (2019–24).

== Geography, transport and economy ==
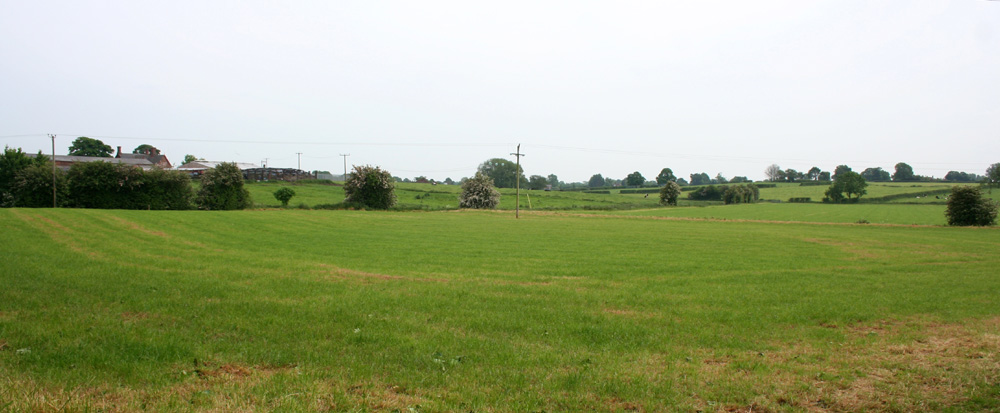
Farmland north of Brindley Lea Hall

Radmore Covert lies at SJ601551, and there is also a small strip of woodland at SJ586539. An unnamed brook runs east–west across the civil parish and there are numerous small meres and ponds scattered across the farmland. The land use is predominantly agricultural, with cattle pasture, horse paddocks and some arable land.

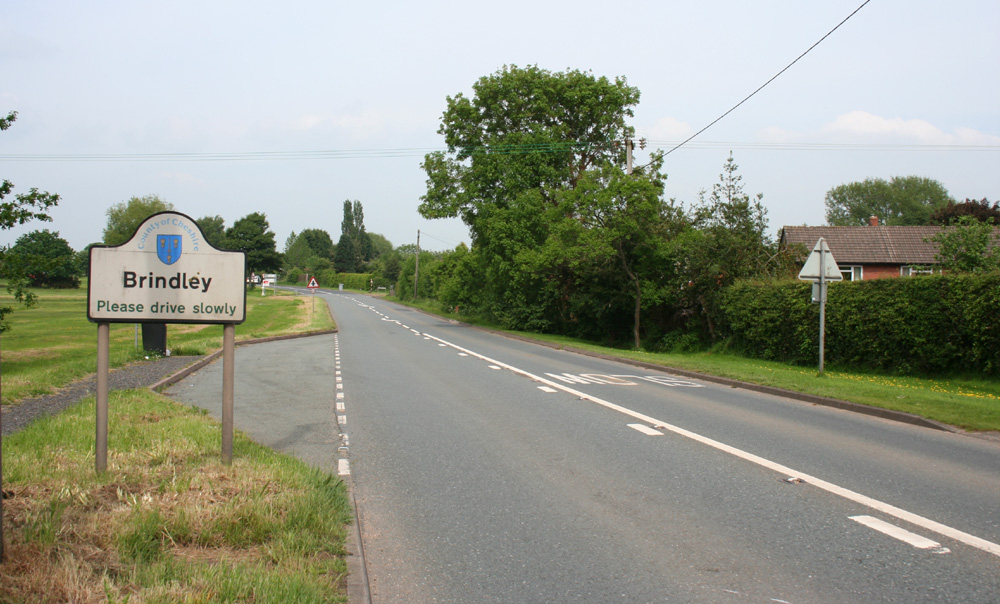
A534 at Brindley

The A534 (Wrexham Road) between Nantwich and Wrexham runs east–west towards the southern boundary of the parish. Other through routes include Brindley Lea Lane and Brindley Hall Road, which both run broadly north from the A534 towards Haughton, Long Lane, which runs to the north west from the A534 to Radmore Green and Haughton, and Kidderton Lane, which runs to the south east from the A534 towards Hollin Green.

== Demography ==
According to the 2001 census, the civil parish had a population of 134, in 58 households. The population increased to 155 at the 2011 Census. The population has remained broadly constant since the beginning of the 19th century; the historical population figures were 148 (1801), 186 (1851), 127 (1901) and 123 (1951).

== Landmarks ==
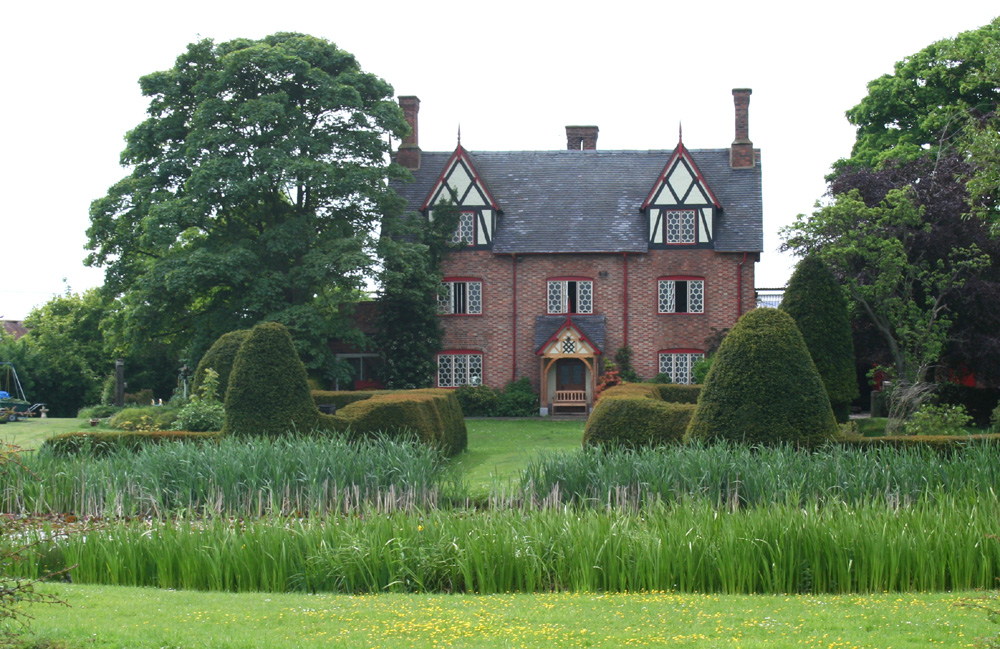
Brindley Lea Hall

Radbrook Cottage on Long Lane in Radmore Green is a timber-framed black-and-white cottage which dates from 1617. A black-and-white cottage on Kidderton Lane dates originally from the late 17th century. Both cottages are listed at grade II. Brindley Lea Hall (SJ590535) is a brown-brick farmhouse which was built around 1860 as part of the Tollemache estate; it is also grade II listed. The present house was built on the site of a moated house, believed to be the seat of the Allen family during the 17th century. The former Wesleyan Methodist chapel in Brindley village dates from 1873.

== Education ==
The Brindley and Faddiley School was built on the common in Brindley Lea in 1850; it closed in 1983. Brindley civil parish falls within the catchment areas of Acton Church of England Primary School in Acton and Malbank School and Sixth Form College in Nantwich.

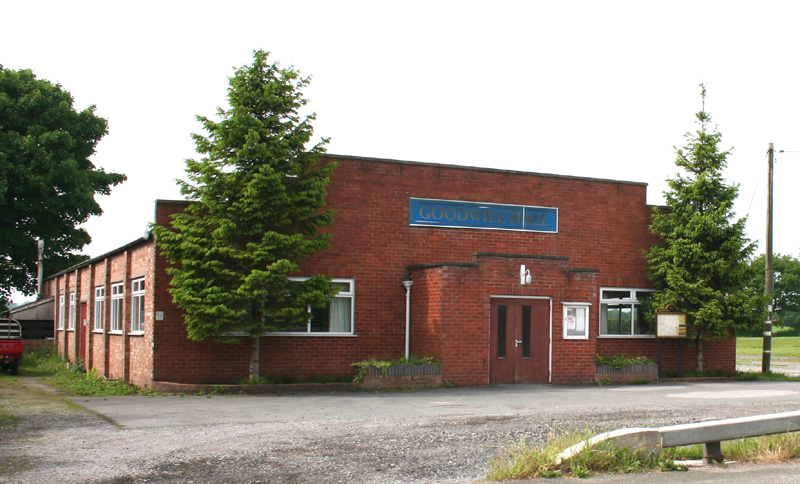
Goodwill Hall

== Culture and community ==
The Goodwill Hall in Brindley Lea (at SJ591531) was built by volunteers in 1962–64, based on an army hut from Isycoed. It forms a venue for theatrical and musical performances as part of the Cheshire Rural Touring Network and also provides a meeting place for local organisations. The mobile library service visits Brindley village weekly.

== See also ==
- Listed buildings in Brindley
