= Woodhey Chapel, Faddiley =

Coordinates: 53.0706°N 2.6383°W

Woodhey Chapel
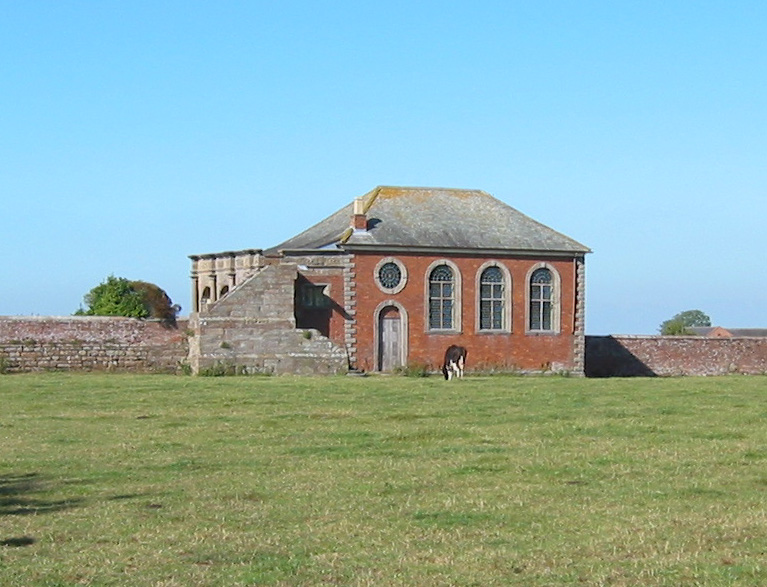
- Woodhey Chapel

- Location in Cheshire
- OS grid reference: SJ 573 527
- Location: near Faddiley, Cheshire
- Country: England
- Denomination: Anglican

History
- Status: Private chapel

Architecture
- Functional status: Redundant
- Heritage designation: Grade I
- Designated: 12 January 1967
- Architectural type: Chapel
- Style: Neoclassical

Specifications
- Materials: Red brick with slate roof Stone loggia

Woodhey Chapel is a Grade I listed private chapel off Woodhey Lane near Faddiley, Cheshire, England. The listing describes the building as 'A handsome and intact example of a chapel from a period when few were built'. The chapel, which is now disused, stands in fields near the site of the demolished Woodhey Hall. Its west end is connected to buildings of the former hall by a causeway which is raised by about 5 feet (2 m).

== History ==
In a will dated 1537 is a possible reference to a domestic chapel at Woodhey. The present chapel dates from about 1700 and was built by Lady Wilbraham, the widow of the Thomas Wilbraham, the last baronet of Woodhey. The chapel was restored in 1926.

== Architecture ==
=== Exterior ===
The chapel is constructed in red brick with stone trimmings and has a slate roof. It was built against an early 17th-century stone loggia which forms its west face. The loggia provided an entrance for the Wilbraham family to the west gallery of the chapel. It consists of an arcade of three segmental archivolts supported by Doric columns. Above these is a strapwork decorated frieze and an overhanging moulded cornice. On each side are steps leading from the causeway to ground level. Richards describes the loggia as "perhaps the most original example in the whole of Cheshire".

The north elevation of the body of the chapel has a door which gave tenants access to the ground floor of the chapel. Above this is a circular window. To the east are three round-headed windows. The south elevation is similar with a dummy door. On the east elevation are two similar windows between which is an ornate framework of stone which contains a weathered lozenge and tablet.

=== Interior ===
The nave is in three bays with oak panelling and a single-bay gallery. At the east end between the windows is a pedimented reredos inscribed with the Ten Commandments in gold. Below this is a panelled oak pulpit carved with fruit and leaf motifs and a moulded cornice. The floor of the chancel is paved with tessellated squares of black and white marble while the rest of the floor is tiled. The gallery was heated by two fireplaces at the corners of the walls. In the gallery are pews on each side of the doorway. At the front of the gallery the oak screen has grilles of split cane. The ceiling of the chapel is plastered and formed into thirty panels by slender timber mouldings.

== External features ==
The retaining wall of the causeway leading to the west end of the chapel dates from the early 18th century and is composed of coursed red sandstone. It is listed at Grade II. The chapel is located in a walled enclosure which was formerly a garden. The walls date from the early 17th century and are built from red brick with a stone dressing. They are also Grade II listed.

== Woodhey Cross ==
Around 500 m to the east of the chapel at a junction on Woodhey Lane (grid reference SJ577527) is a late medieval red sandstone cross known as Woodhey Cross. It is Grade II* listed.

== See also ==
- Grade I listed buildings in Cheshire East
- Grade I listed churches in Cheshire
- Listed buildings in Faddiley
