= Listed buildings in Spurstow =

Spurstow is a civil parish in Cheshire East, England. It contains 17 buildings that are recorded in the National Heritage List for England as designated listed buildings. Of these, one is listed at Grade II*, the middle grade, and the others are at Grade II. The parish is mainly rural, and the listed buildings include houses, cottages, farmhouses, farm buildings, a smithy, and a school.

== Key ==
Grade	Criteria
II*	Particularly important buildings of more than special interest
II	Buildings of national importance and special interest

== Buildings ==
Name and location	Photograph	Date	Notes	Grade
Bath House; 53.09333°N 2.64425°W		Late 16th century	A timber-framed farmhouse with brick nogging on a tall sandstone plinth and with a tiled roof. The building consists of a hall and a cross-wing. It is in two storeys, with both wings having fronts of three bays. The west gable is jettied at the upper storey and at the apex. There is a French window, and the other windows are casements. The interior contains a number of original features.	II*
Dolphin Cottage; 53.10998°N 2.65440°W	—	Early 17th century	A cottage, mainly timber-framed with some brick, on a sandstone plinth and with a tile roof. It is in a single storey with an attic, and has a two-bay front with a later brick lean-to extension to the west. The doorway has a gabled canopy with shaped bargeboards and a finial. Most of the windows are three-light casements, those in the attic in gabled dormers with bargeboards and finials.	II
Lower Hall Cottage; 53.09264°N 2.64679°W		Early 17th century	A cottage, partly timber-framed and partly in brick, on a stone plinth and with a slate roof. It is in a single storey with an attic. The windows are casements with lattice glazing, those in the attic in gabled dormers with bargeboards. The north gable is painted to resemble timber-framing.	II
Spurstow Hall Cottages; 53.10361°N 2.64685°W		Early 17th century	A pair of timber-framed cottages with brick nogging on a sandstone plinth and with a tiled roof. They are in two storeys with a three-bay front, and there is another wing at the rear. On the front are two doorways, each with a canopy; above the right door is a carved wooden panel. The windows are casements with lattice glazing.	II
The Cottage; 53.10891°N 2.65985°W	—	Early 17th century	A timber-framed cottage with brick nogging that has been pebbledashed. It stands on a sandstone plinth, a brick wing has been added, and it has a slate roof. It is in two storeys and has a two-bay front. The windows are two-light casements.	II
Farm building, Brownhills; 53.11350°N 2.66012°W	—	Late 17th century	The farm building is mainly in brick, with some brick nogged timber-framing and a slate roof. It is in two storeys with a six-bay front. It contains various doorways and windows, the windows in the upper storey being in gabled dormers. Some of the internal timbers are carved with ecclesiastical motifs.	II
Haycroft; 53.11018°N 2.66757°W		Late 17th century	A farmhouse mainly in brick but with some timber-framing and sandstone, and with a slate roof. It has a double pile plan, it is in two storeys with an attic, and has a three-bay front. On the front are two gables and a stone parapet. Most of the windows are two-light casements.	II
The Butlands; 53.10353°N 2.66161°W	—	Late 17th century	A timber-framed cottage with plastered brick nogging on a brick plinth and with a slate roof. It is in one storey with an attic and has a one-bay front. To the west is a later two-storey two-bay extension in rendered brick. The windows are casements, those in the original part having lattice glazing, and those in the upper floor being in a dormer and in the gable end.	II
Gatepiers, Spurstow Lower Hall; 53.09249°N 2.65009°W		Late 17th century	The gate piers are in red sandstone and have moulded bases. Two of the faces contain panels, and the piers are surmounted by overhanging moulded caps with pineapple finials.	II
Barn, Stone Cottage; 53.10037°N 2.66063°W	—	Late 17th century	A timber-framed barn with brick nogging and a slate roof. It is a small single-storey building.	II
Talbarn; 53.11012°N 2.65624°W		Late 17th century	Originally a barn, later incorporated into a house and heavily restored. It is timber-framed with plastered brick nogging and has a tiled roof. It is in two storeys, and the gables have bargeboards.	II
Shippon, Green Butts; 53.10867°N 2.65599°W	—	Early 18th century	A farm building, partly timber-framed and partly in brick, with a tiled roof. It is in two storey, and has a five-bay main wing, and a two-bay west wing, giving it a T-shaped plan.	II
Green Butts; 53.10881°N 2.65646°W	—	Early 19th century	A brick farmhouse on a sandstone plinth with a tiled roof. It has a T-shaped plan, is in two storeys with and attic, and has a front of four bays. On the front is a gabled porch with bargeboards and finials. The windows are casements, those in the attic being in gabled dormers.	II
Spurstow Hall; 53.10395°N 2.64531°W		Early 19th century	The farmhouse of a model farm for the Crewe estate. It is in brick on a stone plinth with a slate roof, and has two storeys with an attic. The farmhouse is in a double pile plan, and has a front of three bays. The outer bays contain small bay windows, and there are also French windows. Most of the windows are casements, those in the attic being in gabled half-dormers with decorative bargeboards and finials.	II
Brown Hills; 53.11385°N 2.65965°W	—	c. 1830	A brick farmhouse on a projecting sandstone plinth with a slate roof. It has a T-shaped plan, is in two storeys, and has a three-bay front. The doorcase is pilastered and has an open pediment and a fanlight. The windows are mullioned and transomed.	II
Spurstow Smithy; 53.10823°N 2.65101°W	—	c. 1870	The smithy was built for the Crewe estate. It is in brick with a tiled half-hipped roof. The smithy is in a single storey, and has a four-bay front. It contains a carriage opening and cast iron lattice-glazed windows. On the roof are diamond-shaped ventilators, on the west gable is a chimney stack, and on the east gable is a metal finial with the Crewe emblem.	II
Spurstow Primary School; 53.10028°N 2.63784°W		1872	The school was built for the Crewe estate, and designed by Thomas Bower in Gothic Revival style. It is constructed in red and blue brick with a roof of tiles in red and blue bands. It has an E-shaped plan, with a two-storey gabled wing to the left. A three-bay wing extends to the right, and is in a single storey with dormers in the attic. In the angle between them is a projecting porch with a Tudor arched doorway, above which is a clock face. Rising above the porch is a tower, square at the bottom, becoming octagonal, and capped by a pagoda-like slate spire. The windows are mullioned and transomed with Gothic tracery.	II

== See also ==
- Listed buildings in Bunbury
- Listed buildings in Haughton
- Listed buildings in Brindley
- Listed buildings in Ridley
- Listed buildings in Peckforton
- Listed buildings in Beeston
