= Listed buildings in Henhull =

Henhull is a former civil parish in Cheshire East, England. It contained four buildings that are recorded in the National Heritage List for England as designated listed buildings, all of which are at Grade II. This grade is the lowest of the three gradings given to listed buildings and is applied to "buildings of national importance and special interest". The parish contained no major settlements, and was almost entirely rural. The Shropshire Union Canal passed through the parish. All the listed buildings are close to the entrance of its Nantwich Basin, and consist of a bridge, a lock gate, a milepost, and a cottage.

Name and location	Photograph	Date	Notes
Basin End; 53.07188°N 2.53993°W		Early 19th century	A brick cottage with a slate roof. It is in two storeys with a two-bay front and a single-bay lean-to extension. The left bay projects forward and is gabled. It contains a round-headed doorway. The windows in the ground floor are horizontal sliding sashes and in the upper floor are casements.
Nantwich Junction Bridge; 53.07233°N 2.53967°W		c. 1826	This is bridge no. 92 over the Shropshire Union Canal. It is a roving bridge carrying the towpath over the canal at the entry to Nantwich Basin. The bridge is built in brick with stone quoins, parapets, and pier caps. It is a humped skew bridge with a single arch, and there are cast iron rubbing posts at the angles of the arch.
Lock gate, Nantwich Junction Bridge; 53.07237°N 2.53974°W	—	c. 1826	This is a single wooden lock gate. It is used for drainage, and when closed separates Nantwich Aqueduct from Nantwich Basin End and the northern section of the canal.
Milepost; 53.07245°N 2.53967°W	—	c. 1826	The milepost is in cast iron and has a domed top. It is 60 centimetres (24 in) high and 15 centimetres (6 in) in diameter. It carries a T-shaped plate divided into three parts which contain "NANTWICH" and the distances in miles to Autherley Junction and Norbury Junction.

== See also ==
- Listed buildings in Acton
- Listed buildings in Hurleston
- Listed buildings in Nantwich
- Listed buildings in Worleston
