= Nantwich Aqueduct =

Aqueduct in Acton, Cheshire, England

Coordinates: 53°04′09″N 2°32′09″W

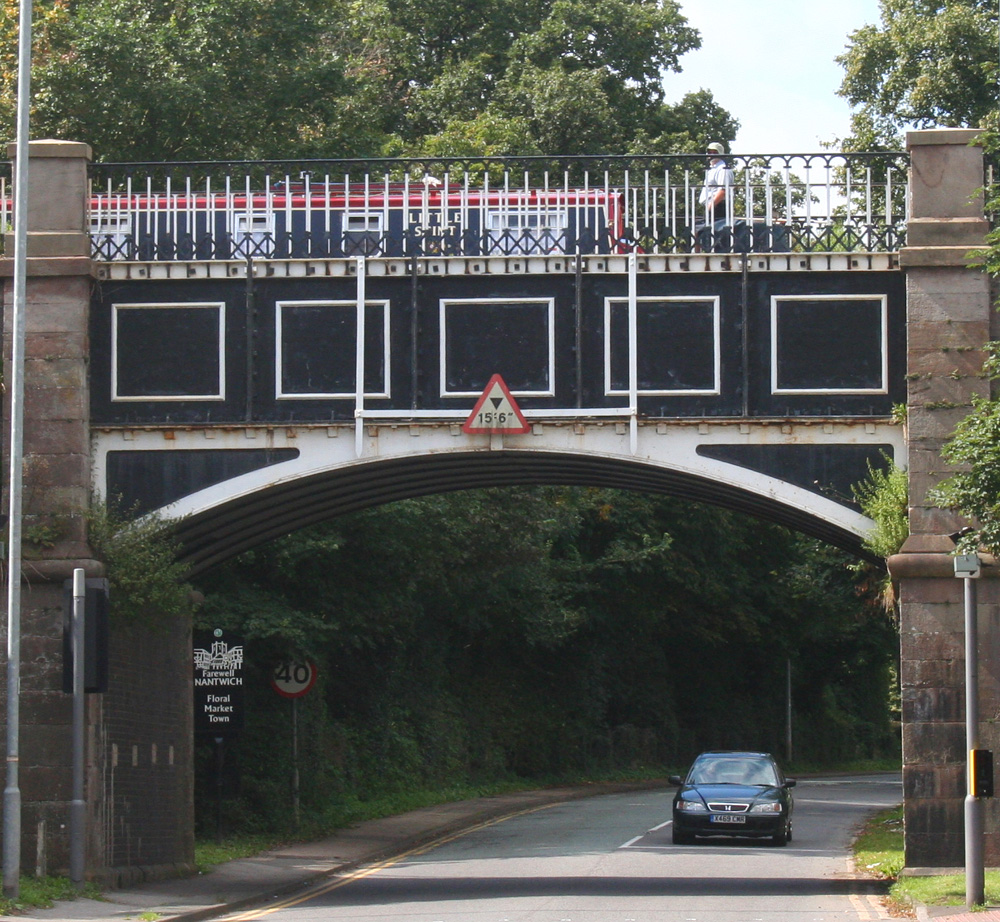
Nantwich Aqueduct, Acton

Nantwich Aqueduct is a navigable aqueduct in Acton in Cheshire, England, which carries the Shropshire Union Canal over the Chester to Nantwich road. Designed by Thomas Telford, it dates from around 1826 and is listed at grade II*.

== History ==
Nantwich Aqueduct was constructed in around 1826, with Thomas Telford as the consulting engineer. Telford designed several aqueducts on the Shropshire Union and other canals using cast iron troughs. The Nantwich example is one of three by Telford with a similar design; the others are at Congleton, also in Cheshire, and Stretton in Staffordshire.

Restoration work was carried out in 2015. The project won the restoration and historic environment category of the Canal & River Trust's Living Waterways Awards in 2016.

== Location and description ==
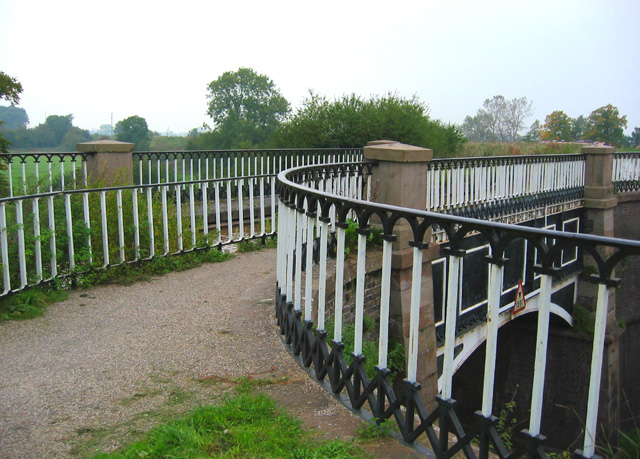
Curved balustrade on the tow path

Nantwich Aqueduct is located at SJ6420352578 in the civil parish of Acton, 0.5 miles south east of the village of Acton, and on the edge of the town of Nantwich. It carries the main line of the Shropshire Union Canal (formerly the Birmingham and Liverpool Junction Canal) over the Chester to Nantwich A534 road. It is listed at grade II*, a grade which recognises "particularly important buildings of more than special interest".

The aqueduct has a single cast-iron arch, with a ribbed underside. The arch spans 29 feet 6 inches and has a maximum height above the road of 15 feet 6 inches. The cast-iron water trough is 13 feet wide, and is flanked on each side by 4 feet wide tow paths, which are paved in red brick. On each side of the bridge, at the level of the water trough, there are five square bolted panels. The arch stretches between stone-dressed brick abutments, which feature pilasters. These stand adjacent to curved brick walls with a stone coping, which retain the embankment. The structure is topped on each side by cast-iron balustrades, 3 feet 9 inch high, which continue along the curved embankment walls.

== See also ==
- List of canal aqueducts in the United Kingdom
- Listed buildings in Acton, Cheshire
