= Faddiley =

Village in Cheshire, England

Coordinates: 53.076°N 2.611°W

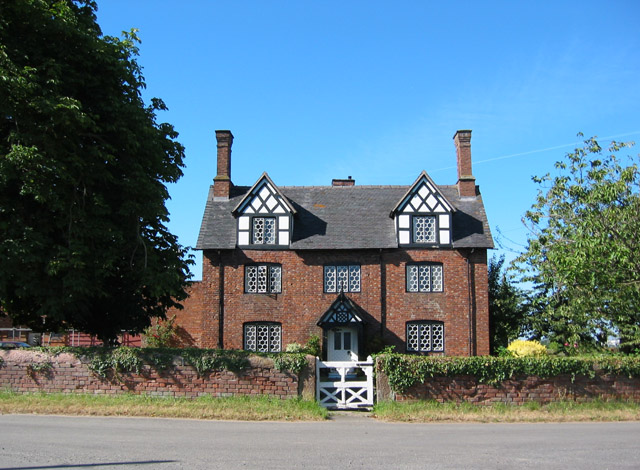
- Cooks Pit Farm is typical of the Victorian buildings of this area

- Location within Cheshire
- Population: 163 (2011)
- OS grid reference: SJ590530
- Civil parish: Faddiley
- Unitary authority: Cheshire East
- Ceremonial county: Cheshire
- Region: North West
- Country: England
- Sovereign state: United Kingdom
- Post town: NANTWICH
- Postcode district: CW5
- Dialling code: 01270
- Police: Cheshire
- Fire: Cheshire
- Ambulance: North West
- UK Parliament: Chester South and Eddisbury

Faddiley is a small village (at SJ 590 530) and civil parish in the unitary authority of Cheshire East and the ceremonial county of Cheshire, England. The village is located 4 miles to the west of Nantwich. The parish also includes the small settlements of Larden Green and Woodhey or Woodhey Green, with a total population of just over 150, measured at 163 during the 2011 Census. Nearby villages include Brindley, Burland, Chorley, Haughton and Ravensmoor.

== Governance ==
Since 1967, Faddiley has been administered by the Brindley and Faddiley Parish Council, jointly with the adjacent civil parish of Brindley. From 1974 the civil parish was served by Crewe and Nantwich Borough Council, which was succeeded on 1 April 2009 by the unitary authority of Cheshire East. Faddiley falls in the parliamentary constituency of Chester South and Eddisbury, which has been represented since the 2024 general election by Aphra Brandreth of the Conservative Party. It was previously part of the Eddisbury constituency, which since its establishment in 1983 had been held by the Conservative MPs Alastair Goodlad (1983–99), Stephen O'Brien (1999–2015), Antoinette Sandbach (2015–19) and Edward Timpson (2019–24).

== Geography and transport ==
The A534 (Wrexham Road) runs east–west through the parish.

== Demography ==
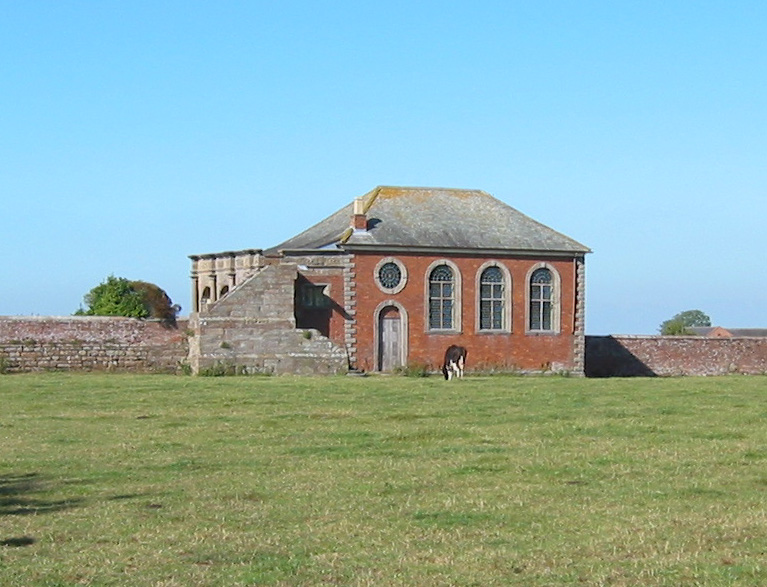
Woodhey Chapel

According to the 2001 census, the civil parish had a population of 163. The historical population figures were 224 (1801), 314 (1851), 227 (1901) and 193 (1951).

== Places of worship ==
The grade-I-listed Woodhey Chapel is located near Woodhey Green. Formerly the chapel of the old Woodhey Hall, now demolished, it was built in around 1700 for the widow of Sir Thomas Wilbraham, the last baronet of Woodhey.

Woodhey Methodist Chapel was a Wesleyan chapel founded in 1809. It was rebuilt at a different location in 1873, and closed in 1980.

== Other notable landmarks ==
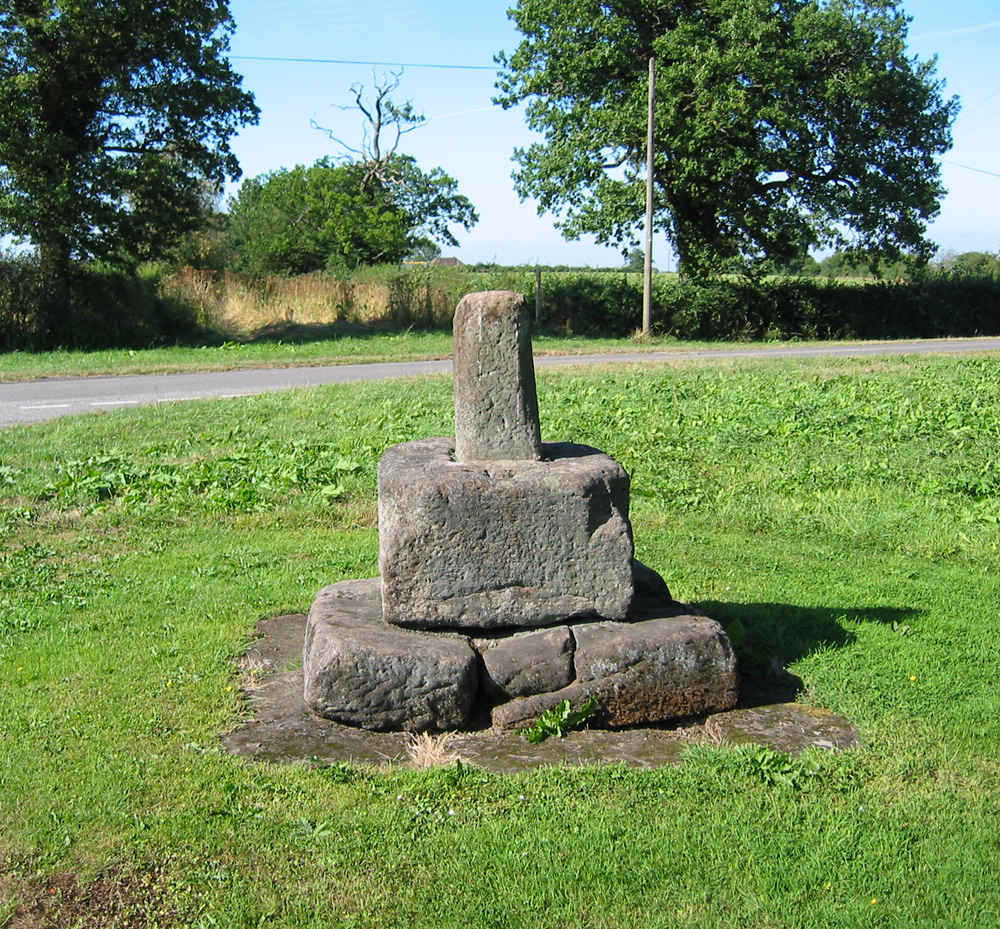
Woodhey Cross

Woodhey Cross is a Grade-II*-listed late medieval sandstone cross, which stands at a junction on Woodhey Lane, around 500 m east of Woodhey Chapel.

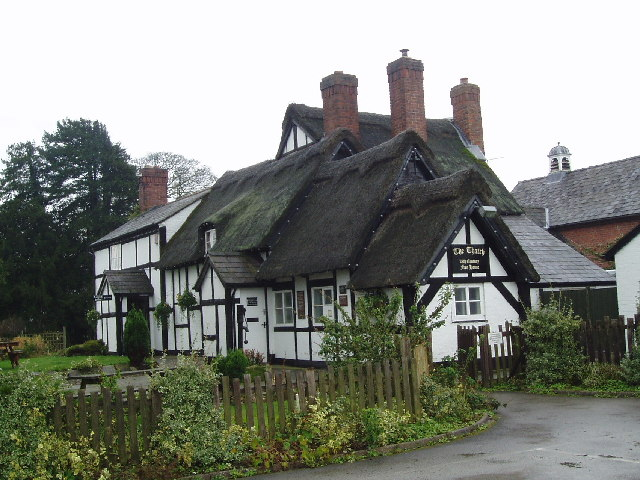
Thatch Inn, Faddiley

The present Woodhey Hall is a Grade-II-listed red-brick farmhouse, built around 1870 as part of the Tollemache Estate.

The Thatch Inn public house is located on Wrexham Road in Faddiley village. Formerly the Tollemache Arms, the Grade-II-listed black-and-white inn dates from the late 15th century. The civil parish contains several other Grade-II-listed timber-framed buildings dating from the 17th and early 18th centuries. These include Dragon's Cottage and Fingerpost Farmhouse on Wrexham Road, Ivy Cottage on Holling Green Lane, Botterleyhill on Springe Lane, and the Old Cart House near Woodhey Hall, a former barn converted to residential use.

== Sport ==
Faddiley has a football team, established in 1968, which has played in the Crewe Regional Sunday Football League since 1971.

== See also ==
- Listed buildings in Faddiley
