= Haughton Hall, Cheshire =

Country house in Haughton, Cheshire, England

Coordinates: 53.10334°N 2.61719°W

Haughton Hall is a country house to the east of the village of Haughton, Cheshire, England. It was rebuilt between 1891 and 1894 for the shipowner and art collector Ralph Brocklebank. The architect was J. F. Doyle, the design being influenced by the Old English picturesque style of Norman Shaw. The house was altered in about 1950, reducing it from three storeys to two, and replacing tile-hanging with roughcast. It is constructed in red brick, some of which has been roughcast, and has red tiled roofs. The house has an L-shaped plan. The garden front is in two storeys and has five bays; there is a single-storey five-bay wing to the east, and a three-storey three-bay service wing to the north. In the garden front are three bay windows, a Venetian window and a door. Above the door is a sundial. The house is recorded in the National Heritage List for England as a designated Grade II listed building.

== Residents ==
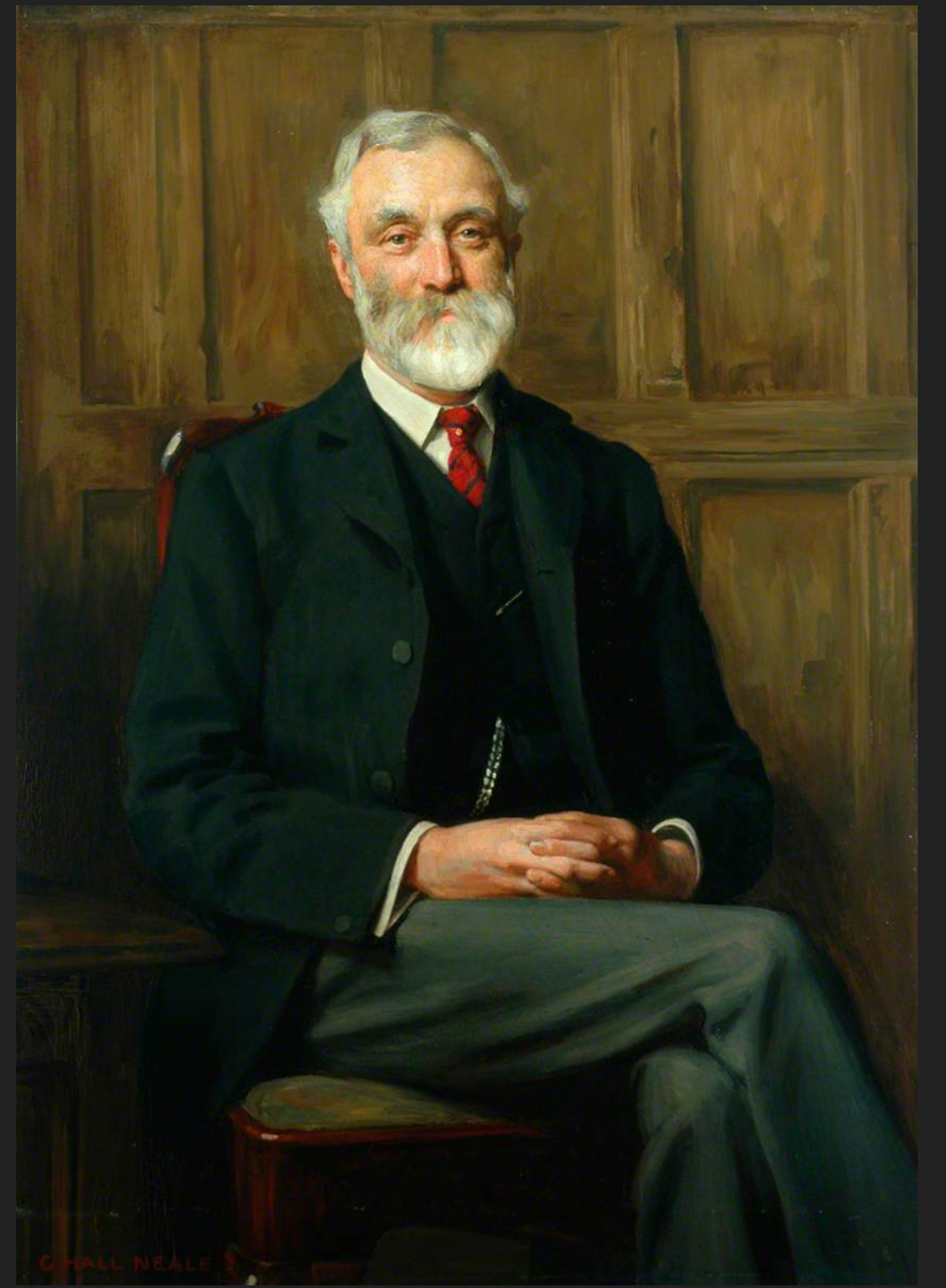
Ralph Brocklebank

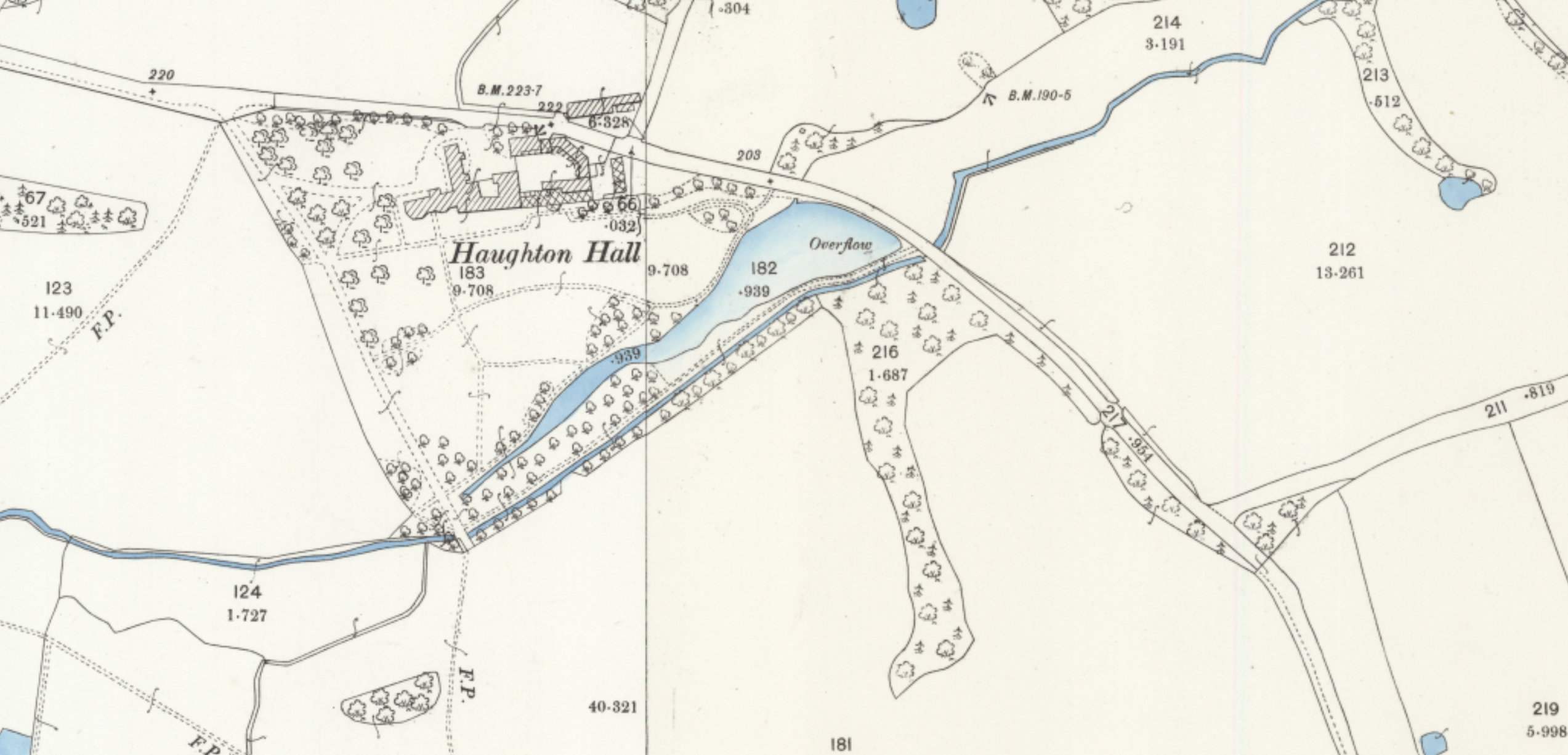
Map Haughton Hall 1900

Ralph Brocklebank (1840–1921) built the house in about 1891. It was erected on the site of the previous Haughton Hall which was owned by the Garnett-Botfield family. He bought the whole estate from the Rev William Bishton Garnett-Botfield in 1889.

Ralph was a partner in the family shipping company The Brocklebank Line formally called T&J Brocklebank. He later became a Director of the London and North Western Railway Company. He was born in Liverpool in 1840. His father also named Ralph Brocklebank (1803–1892) was a very wealthy shipping magnate and when he died in 1892 Ralph inherited a large sum of money which undoubtedly assisted with the building of Haughton Hall.

He did not marry and consequently was able to spend his inherited fortune on his personal interests. He had a very large collection of valuable paintings which were kept in the hall. In 1904 he published a book called “Pictures and engravings at Haughton Hall, Tarporley in the possession of Ralph Brocklebank”.

He also invested his money into the Haughton Hall Estate. He was often commended for his assistance to his tenant farmers. One agricultural magazine commented.

"Mr Ralph Brocklebank, Tarporley one of Cheshire’s best landowners who in re-establishing old homesteads and equipping them with up-to-date dairies has done much towards assisting his tenantry."

When Ralph died in 1921 the 1500 acre estate was advertised for sale. The farms were split into separate lots and many of the tenant farmers bought their own farms. The cover of the sale catalogue is shown at this reference. The Dunn family bought the Haughton Hall lot.

John Robertson Dunn (1876–1940) was the owner of a large shipping company in Liverpool. His father was Charles George Dunn who foundered the company. In 1900 he married Minerva Handred (1866–1943) who was an American heiress. Her father John Wills Handren was a partner in the Brooklyn shipping firm called Hendren & Robins. When he died in 1892 Minerva who was his only child became his sole heir. The couple had no children so when John died in 1940 he left his property to his wife and when she died in 1943 she left her estate to two friends. The house was sold and by 1950 bought by the Dean family.

== The Dean family ==
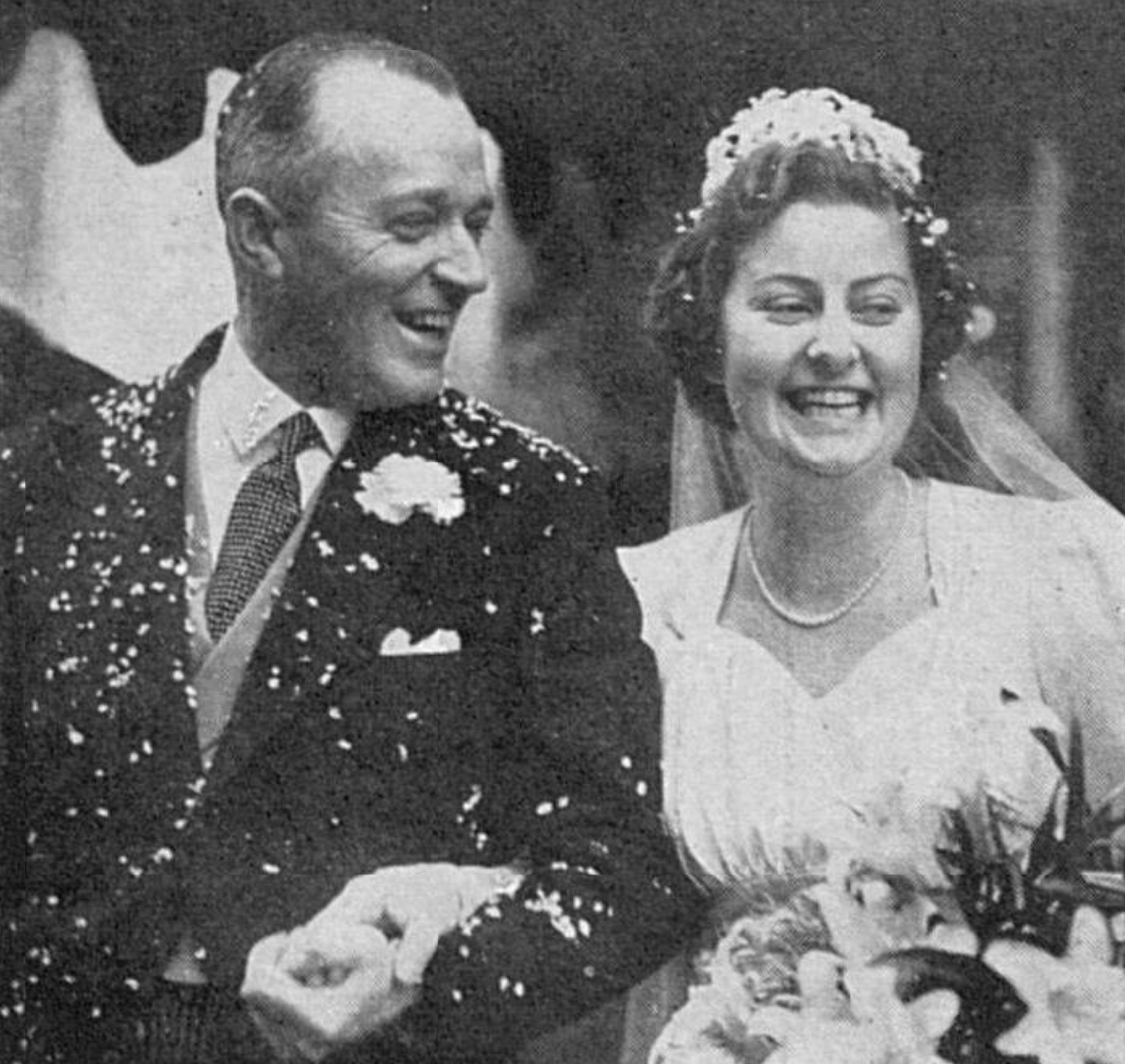
Geoffrey and Joyce Dean 1939

Geoffrey Carter Dean (1900–1987) was a wealthy landowner. His father Edward Dean owned Tiresford House in Tarporley and when he died in 1942 Geoffrey inherited this house. He was educated at Cambridge University and in his youth he was an officer in the Navy. In 1939 he married Gwendoline Joyce Pidduck (1936–1980) (called Joyce) the daughter of Thomas Stanley Pidduck of Corbrook Court Audlem. The couple lived at Tiresford House for many years after their marriage and then in 1950 bought Haughton Hall. They made extensive alterations to the Hall. The entrance bay has a plaque with their initials GCD and GJD and an heraldic symbol in the gable apex.

The couple had no children but both were very involved with the community. They frequently assisted local charities by holding open garden days at Haughton Hall. One newspaper noted:

"He created one of the best rhododendron gardens in Cheshire. In the 1960 he established a water fowl centre which is well known, achieving great success with a flock of pink flamingos and breeding Stanley cranes".

His wife Joyce was very active in the Women's Institute movement and in 1950 founded the Haughton Branch and became its long serving president. She was made a Justice of the Peace in 1961 and sat on the County Bench. She died in 1980 and Geoffrey died in 1987. As they had no children the house was left to a nephew.

== See also ==
- Listed buildings in Haughton, Cheshire
