= Wilbraham baronets =

Extinct baronetcy in the Baronetage of England

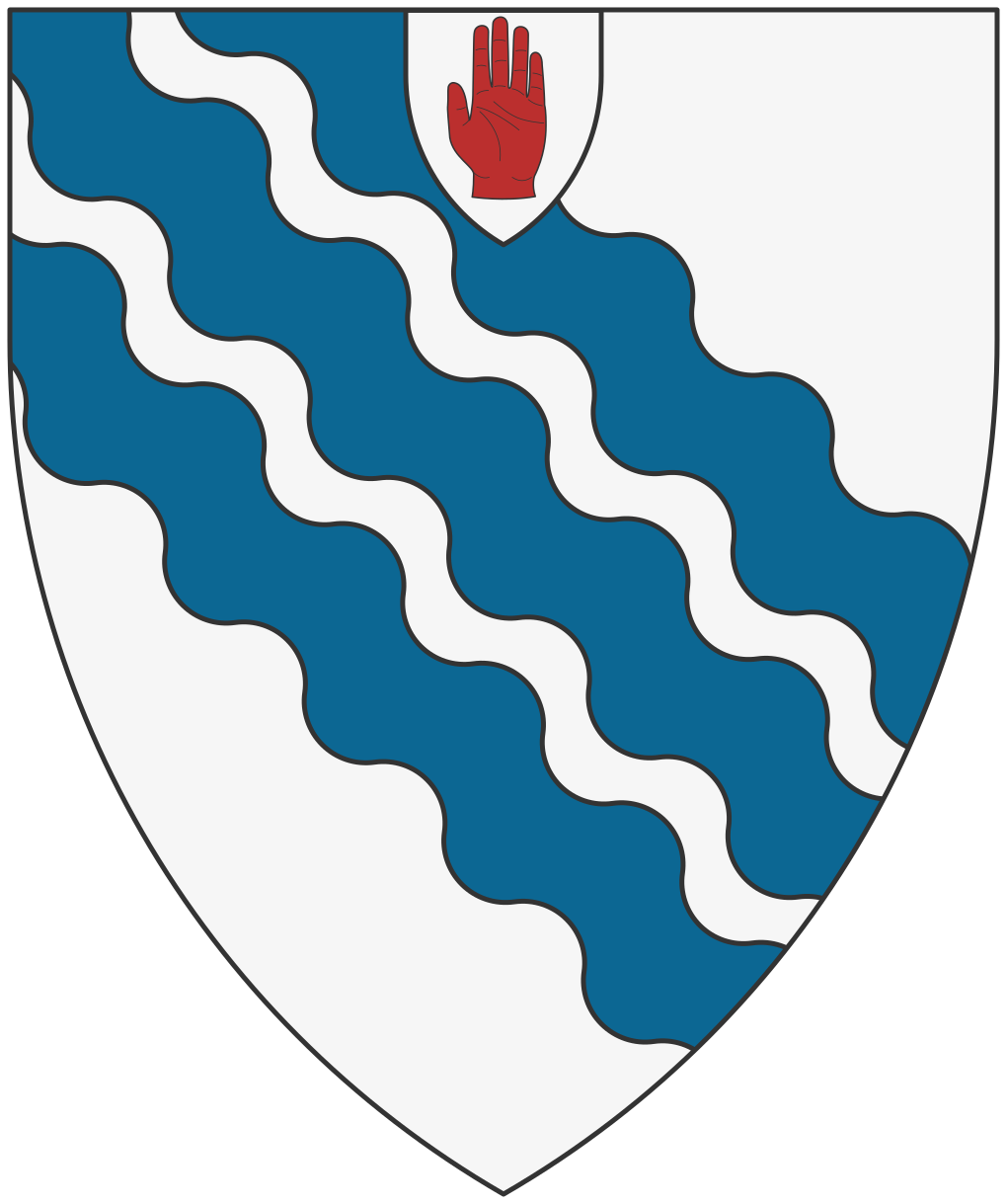
Arms of Wilbraham of Woodhey

The baronetcy of Wilbraham of Woodhey, Cheshire, was created by James I on 5 May 1621 in the Baronetcy of England for Richard Wilbraham. He was a descendant of the ancient Cheshire family of Radnor who acquired Woodhey by marriage in the 14th century. A junior branch of the family settled at Nantwich, and there was some intermarriage between the two.

Richard Wilbraham died as a royalist prisoner at Shrewsbury in 1643 and was buried at Nantwich. An oak armchair painted with his coat of arms survives, and was probably decorated to commemorate his baronetcy.

His grandson, the third Baronet, was High Sheriff of Staffordshire in 1654 and Member of Parliament for Stafford 1679–81. He married Elizabeth Mytton, heiress of Weston under Lizard, Staffordshire, and he and Lady Elizabeth built a new house at Weston Park in 1671. The baronetcy was extinct on his death. The estate passed to his daughter Mary who married Richard Newport, 2nd Earl of Bradford, and later passed to Sir Orlando Bridgeman, 4th Baronet because of marriage to his granddaughter Ann Newport.

For other branches of the family see Baker Wilbraham baronets and Baron Skelmersdale.

== Wilbraham of Woodhey, Cheshire (1621) ==
- Sir Richard Wilbraham, 1st Baronet (1579–1643)
- Sir Thomas Wilbraham, 2nd Baronet (1601–1660)
- Sir Thomas Wilbraham, 3rd Baronet (1630–1692)
