= Woodhey Cross =

Stone cross in Faddiley, Cheshire, England

Coordinates: 53.06922°N 2.63230°W

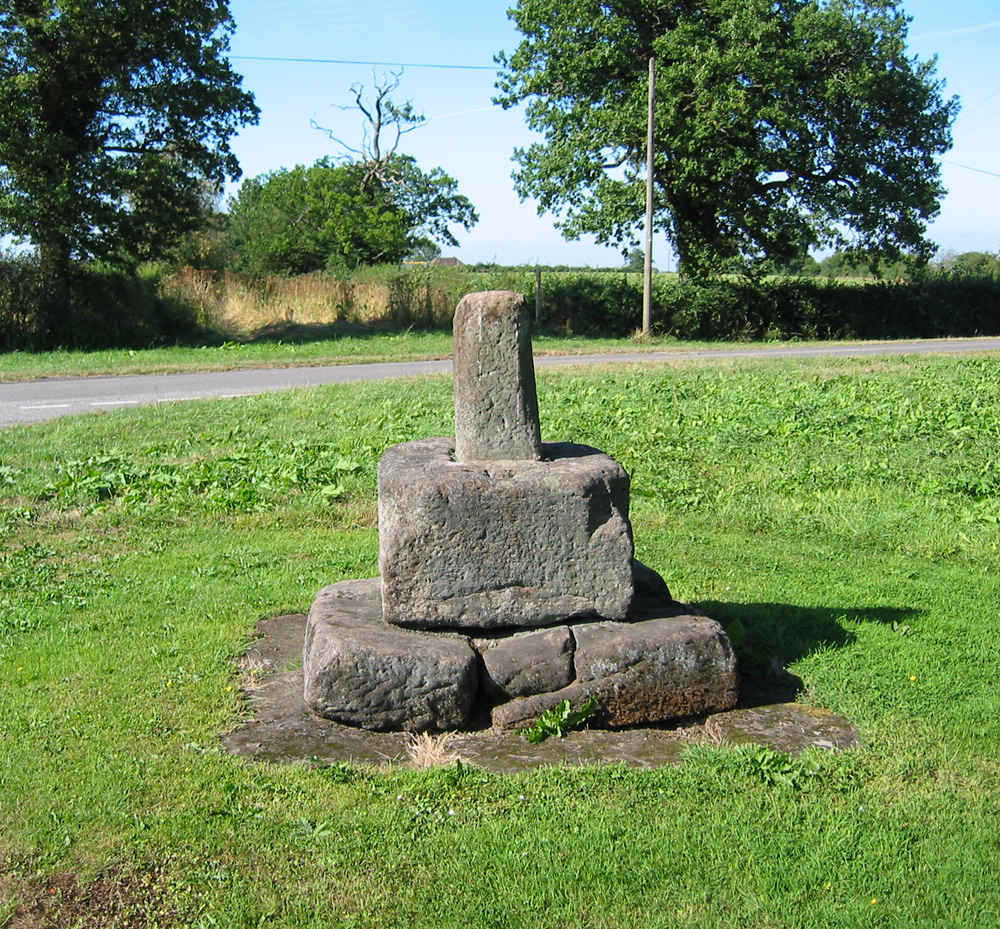
Woodhey Cross

Woodhey Cross is a late-medieval stone cross, probably dating from the early 16th century, located at Woodhey Green near Faddiley in Cheshire, England. It stands at SJ5773052642, on Woodhey Lane at the junction with Woodhey Hall Lane, around 500 metres to the east of Woodhey Chapel. The structure is listed at grade II* and is also a scheduled ancient monument.

== Description ==
Woodhey Cross is typical of stepped crosses in the region dating from the mid-to-late medieval era. The stepped cross, where the shaft is supported by a base stone and elevated on steps, is the most common type among the estimated 2000 free-standing medieval crosses surviving in Britain. This design originated in the 11th and 12th centuries, but this example is thought to date from the early 16th century. The cross remains at the site where it was originally erected, and it is considered likely to be associated with the occupants of the medieval Woodhey Hall, which stood nearby. George Ormerod, in his 1819 history of the county, describes it as an "unusual appendage to the seats of the Cheshire gentry."

The Woodhey Cross is constructed of red sandstone and stands around 1.3 metres high. It consists of a square shaft (0.34 metres square × 0.60 metres in height) inserted into a large square base block (0.8 metres × 0.85 metres × 0.52 metres in height), which rests on two levels of steps. Only a fraction of the original shaft remains; the cross head has been removed. The local historian Frank Latham speculates that this might have occurred in 1547, when Newhall Cross was removed. The steps are constructed from several large stone pieces. The bottom step (1.9 metres × 1.95 metres) is mostly buried, with its top surface level with the ground; the second one (1.3 metres square × 0.25 metres in height) is particularly badly eroded. The base block has the letters "AH" incised in it, on the east side of the top.

Clare Hartwell et al. comment in the Buildings of England volume that it is "[m]ore substantial than most". The condition was assessed by the Public Monument and Sculpture Association as "fair". The Scheduled Monument listing (1999) states that it "survives well".

== See also ==
- List of Scheduled Monuments in Cheshire (1066–1539)
- Listed buildings in Faddiley
