= External render =

An external render is, in its most basic form, a coating applied to the walls of a building, to provide a protective coating which would prevent rain penetration. It also acts as a decorative finish to enhance the appearance of a building.

== History ==
Rendering is a traditional craft that has evolved over many centuries. Basic rendering began as a method of excluding draughts and rain by using clay to fill in cracks and crevices, referred to as wattle-and-daub. Other renders, based on lime binders were also used over the years. These materials had one significant disadvantage in that they were not very resistant to water.

The introduction of Portland cement meant that durable mortars could be produced and weather resistant renders resulted. Through the years technological advances have aided the development of cutting edge render systems that aim to improve the longevity of a buildings structural capacity.

== Manufacture and production ==
Traditionally, a render would be manufactured on site by a plasterer mixing sand, cement and sometimes lime material together with water to produce his render. This would then be applied to the walls, usually in either two or three coats.

When painting, there is usually a primer, an undercoat and a topcoat. Similarly in renders there may be a stipple coat, then an undercoat (sometimes called a base coat) and finally a final coat (sometimes called a topcoat). The difference is that in renders, the final thickness is 15 mm.

Development of a site mixed render is the factory made render. All the render ingredients are dry blended together in a modern factory, creating a powdered product which can be supplied in bags. When the product is delivered to site the plasterer just needs to mix the product with water and apply it to the wall.

The factory made render has an advantage over the site mixed render in that the composition of the render and all the raw materials are closely controlled and accurately measured. Supplying a render in this way allows the manufacturer to include performance enhancing additives into the formulation. Whilst many site mixed renders are subsequently painted, factory made renders can be supplied as a wide variety of self-coloured products, eliminating the additional expense of painting.

== Application ==
There are two main methods of applying render, by hawk and trowel or by machine. In the hawk and trowel method the product is first mixed with water to a workable paste and then the plasterer applies the wet paste render to the wall and levels it off, using a hawk and trowel. Machine applied renders are usually factory made products. The machine is essentially a mixing pump which mixes the product with water and pumps the paste to a nozzle which sprays it onto the wall. The wet paste is than levelled off. Application of render using a machine is usually a much faster operation than by hand, meaning that larger areas can be rendered during a working day. The application of render has to be completed in the correct weather conditions. If the temperature is too low, moisture can be trapped within the render. If the temperature is too high, the render will dry out too quickly, leading to the formation of cracks.
