= Weston Park =

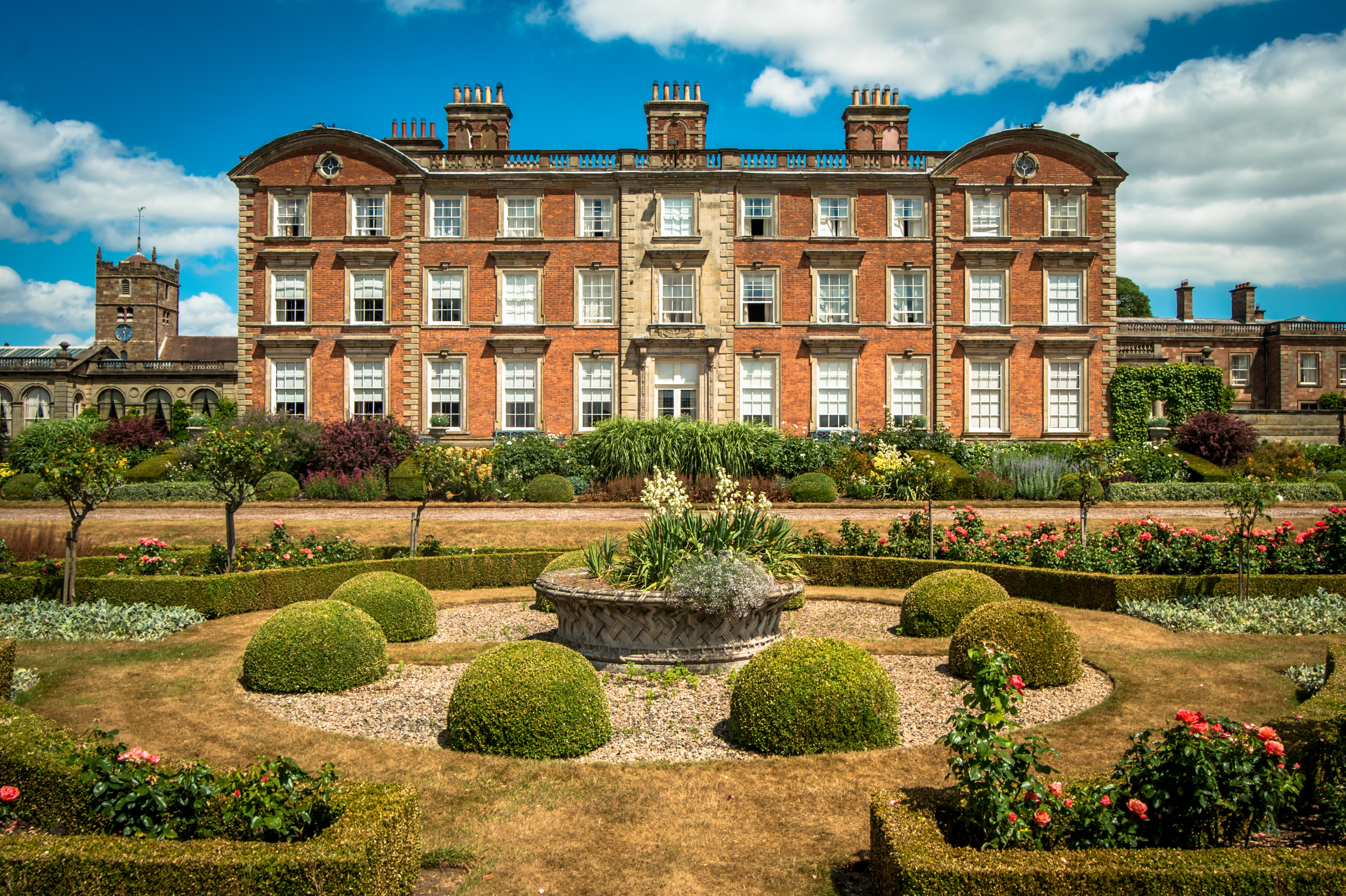
- The South (garden) frontage

- Location within Staffordshire
- 52.6929°N 2.2879°W
- Type: House
- Location: Weston-under-Lizard, Staffordshire

History
- Built: c. 1670

Site notes
- Architect: attributed to Elizabeth Wilbraham
- Architectural style: Carolean
- Governing body: Private

Listed Building – Grade I
- Official name: Weston Hall and service wings to north and east
- Designated: 16 May 1953
- Reference no.: 1039264

Listed Building – Grade II
- Official name: Orangery and attached link to house, 25 m west of Weston Hall
- Designated: 16 May 1953
- Reference no.: 1374071

Listed Building – Grade II
- Official name: Gateway attached to south west of Stable Block of Weston Hall
- Designated: 4 July 1985
- Reference no.: 1374073

Listed Building – Grade II
- Official name: Stable Block, 60 m to north east of entrance front of Weston Hall
- Designated: 16 May 1953
- Reference no.: 1188130

Listed Building – Grade II
- Official name: Stables and Granary at Weston Hall
- Designated: 16 May 1953
- Reference no.: 1188133

Weston Park is a country house in Weston-under-Lizard, Staffordshire, England, set in more than 1,000 acres (400 ha) of park landscaped by Capability Brown. The park is located 10 miles (16 km) north-west of Wolverhampton, and 8 miles (13 km) east of Telford, close to the border with Shropshire. The 17th-century Hall is a Grade I listed building and several other features of the estate, such as the Orangery and the Stable block, are separately listed as Grade II.

Weston Park House and the surrounding parkland were given to the nation in 1986 by the 7th Earl of Bradford, with the support of the National Heritage Memorial Fund. It is now in the care of the trustees of the Weston Park Foundation. The house retains its art collection with over 30,000 objects and is open to the public.

== History ==
Weston lies within land that was first mentioned in the Domesday Book when it was held by Norman Rainald de Bailleuil, Sheriff to Roger de Montgomery. The park is all that remains of the medieval deer park and forest. Originally belonging to the de Westons of Weston, it passed by inheritance to a branch of the Mytton family when their heiress, Elizabeth Mytton married Sir Thomas Wilbraham. Eventually the land passed to Earls of Bradford when their younger daughter, Mary Wilbraham, married Richard Newport, 2nd Earl of Bradford of the first creation.

The house was built in 1671 for Lady Elizabeth Wilbraham. Although it is often claimed that she was her own architect, there is no conclusive documentary evidence for this and it is most likely that the executant architect was William Taylor, who is known to have been at Weston Park in 1674. (Note: In support of William Taylor being the architect, Weston Park notes the architectural similarities between the house and the Church of the Holy Trinity at Minsterley, 30 miles away across the county border in Shropshire, which is known to be by Taylor.) Lady Wilbraham was evidently an enthusiastic patron, however, and her heavily-annotated copy of Palladio’s book (I Quattro Libri dell'Architettura) remains in the collection at Weston Park. The three-storey, twelve-bayed south front of the house was originally the entrance front but alterations and improvements carried out in the latter 19th century for Countess Selina and Orlando Bridgeman, 3rd Earl of Bradford of the second creation, involved the movement of the main entrance to the east front. The original courtyard of the U-shaped house was roofed over above the ground floor, and closed off by a new front.

In the eighteenth century, with the failure of the male line of the Newport Earls of Bradford, Weston was inherited by Sir Henry Bridgeman, 5th Baronet, whose mother Lady Anne Bridgeman (née Newport) was a granddaughter of Lady Wilbraham. The Bridgemans were already substantial landowners in Shropshire and in Warwickshire but chose to make Weston their main seat. Sir Henry Bridgeman commissioned Capability Brown to landscape the park. He also employed James Paine in the 1760s to make alteration to the house and to add a Roman Bridge and Temple of Diana in the park.

== Art collection ==
The collection includes many portraits from the 17th to 20th centuries, with rare pieces such as two portraits of ladies of the Wilbraham family by John Michael Wright, two early portraits by John Constable, and two portraits of apparently the same child by Sofonisba Anguissola. Most major English 18th-century portraitists are represented, and there are a number of portraits by Anthony van Dyck and his workshop; that of Sir Thomas Hanmer is especially fine. There is a George Stubbs of horses, and a pair of coastal scenes by Claude Joseph Vernet (Calm and Storm). There is a rare toilet service in silver of 1679, one of only 12 English-made early services left in the country. There is good furniture, including many pieces made for the house by Thomas Chippendale, and a room with tapestries from the Gobelins Manufactory made for Weston in the 1760s. The elaborately embroidered ceremonial purse (or "burse") of Sir Orlando Bridgeman, in his office of Lord Keeper of the Great Seal (1667–72), is displayed next to a portrait of him with it.

== Beyond the house ==
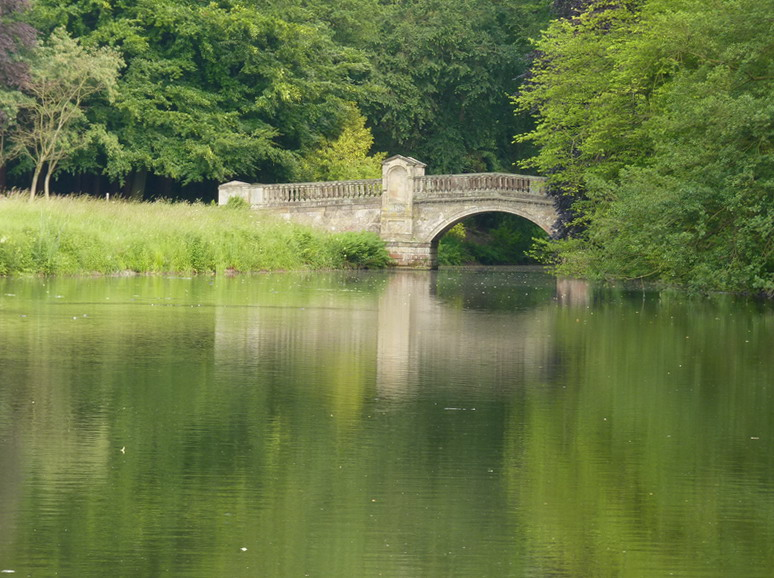
The Roman Bridge

Adjacent to the house is the estate church, dedicated to St Andrew. Pevsner describes the church as "an enterprise of Lady Wilbraham...[of] 1700-1". The orangery, stable block, and granary, which all adjoin the house, have their own Grade II listings. The 1767 Granary building was restored in 2009 with support from the Heritage Lottery Fund and regional development agency Advantage West Midlands.

There are gardens and a large park, which includes a lake and a miniature railway. The Grade I listed Roman Bridge crosses the Temple Pool in a single stone built arch. The Grade I listed Temple of Diana is actually an orangery and garden house. Built in stone ashlar in three bays and fronted with ionic columns, the interior is decorated with painted panels by Giovanni Battista Innocenzo Colombo, depicting the life of the goddess Diana. Paine, its architect, later described the temple as "my greenhouse at Weston". Some believe that the hall and gardens were the inspiration for Blandings Castle in the Lord Emsworth stories by P.G. Wodehouse.

== Visits and festivals ==
King George V's daughter Mary, the Princess Royal spent part of her honeymoon at Weston.

In 1998 the G8 Summit Retreat was held at the house with heads of State or government present including US president Bill Clinton and Russian president Boris Yeltsin.

From 1999 until 2017 the grounds of Weston Park were used as one of the sites of the annual dual-site Virgin sponsored V Festival, the other site being Hylands Park in Chelmsford.

The park is the site for the annual Midland Game Fair which takes place on the third weekend of September. The fair, which consists of traditional British country pursuits including working dog trials, fishing and animal husbandry, attracts up to 50,000 visitors from both Britain and Ireland. In 2023, Weston Park hosted Camp Bestival Shropshire.

In 2024, the site hosted the English National Cross Country Championships.

== Gallery ==
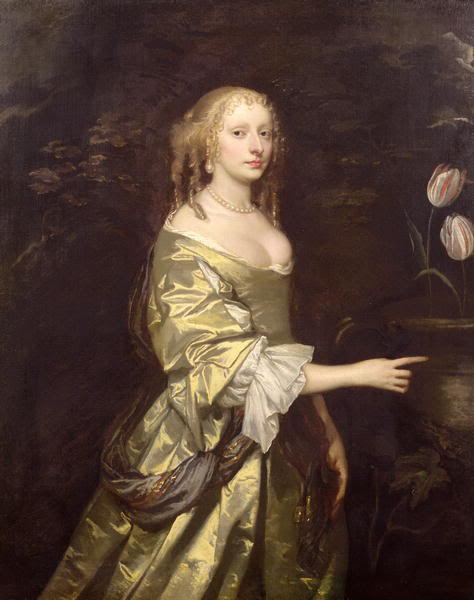
Lady Elizabeth Wilbraham, the possible architect of Weston, by Sir Peter Lely, one of the portraits in the collection

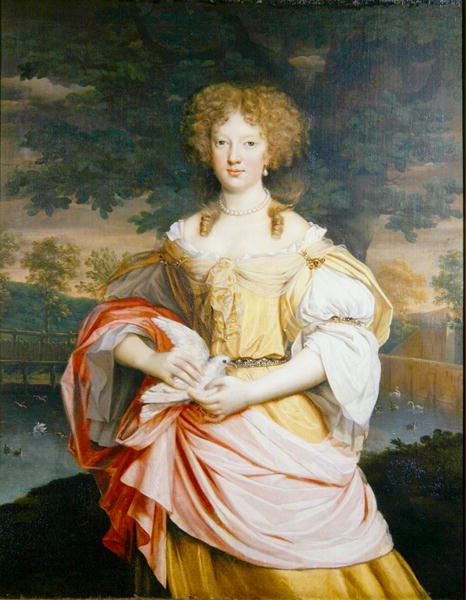
Mary Wilbraham by John Michael Wright

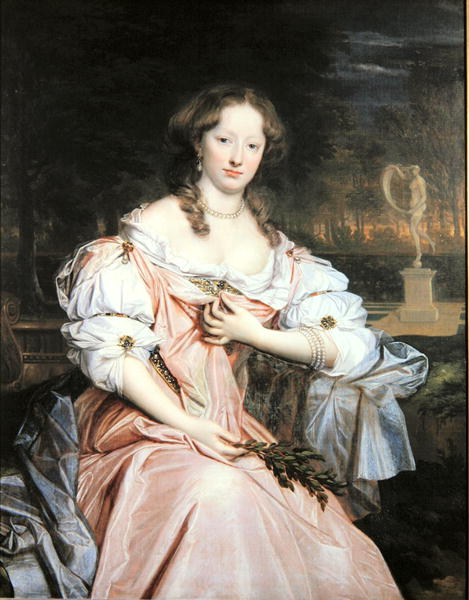
Grace Wilbraham by John Michael Wright

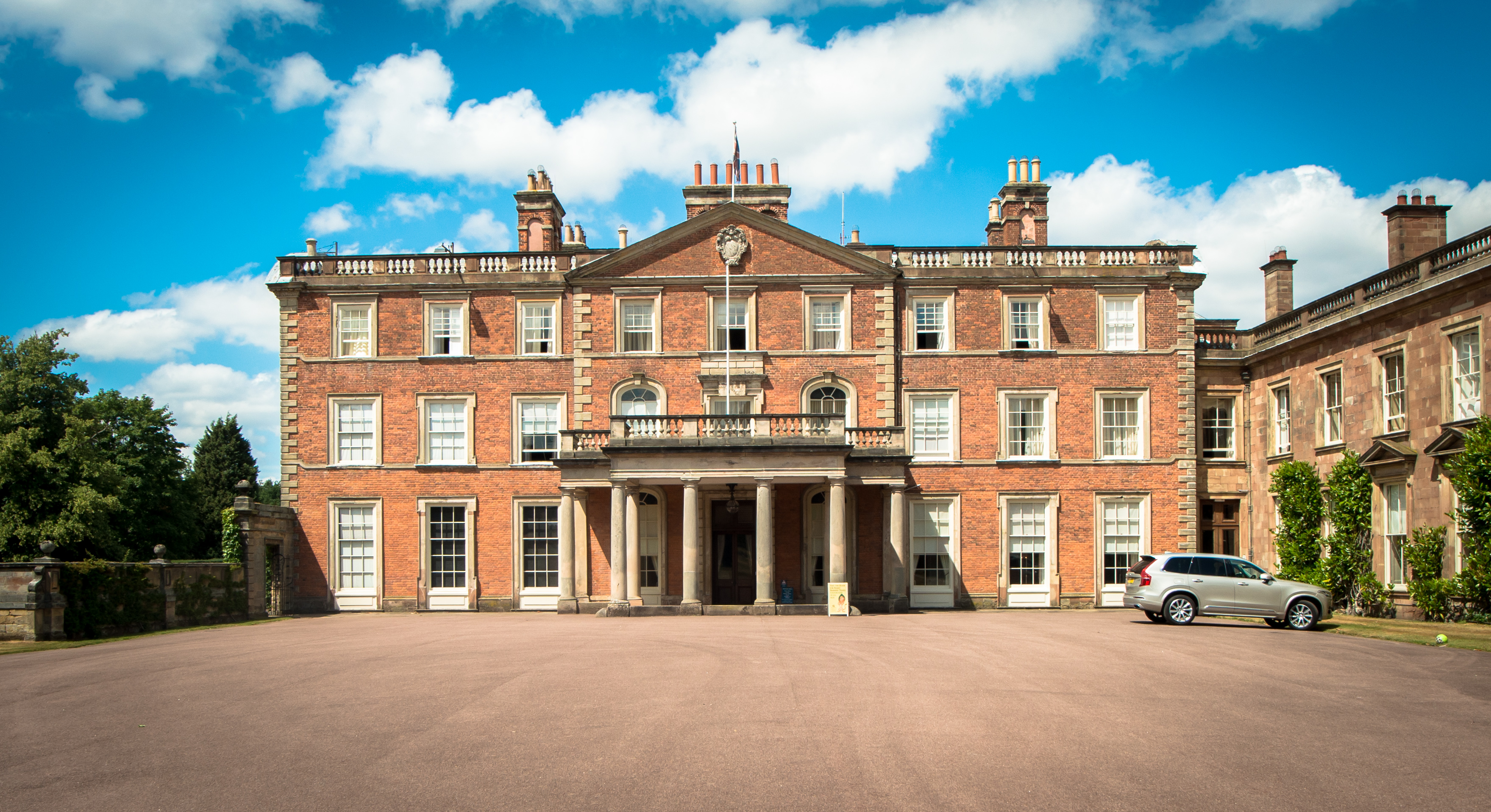
Main entrance

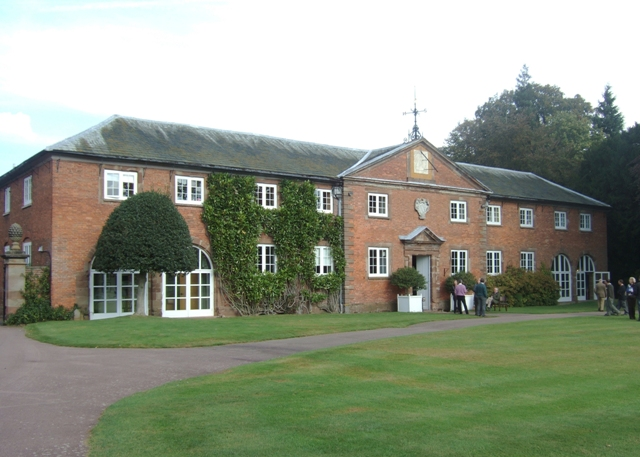
Stable block

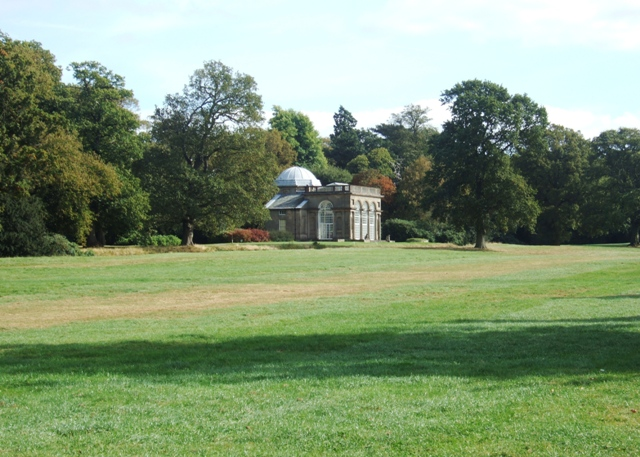
Temple of Diana

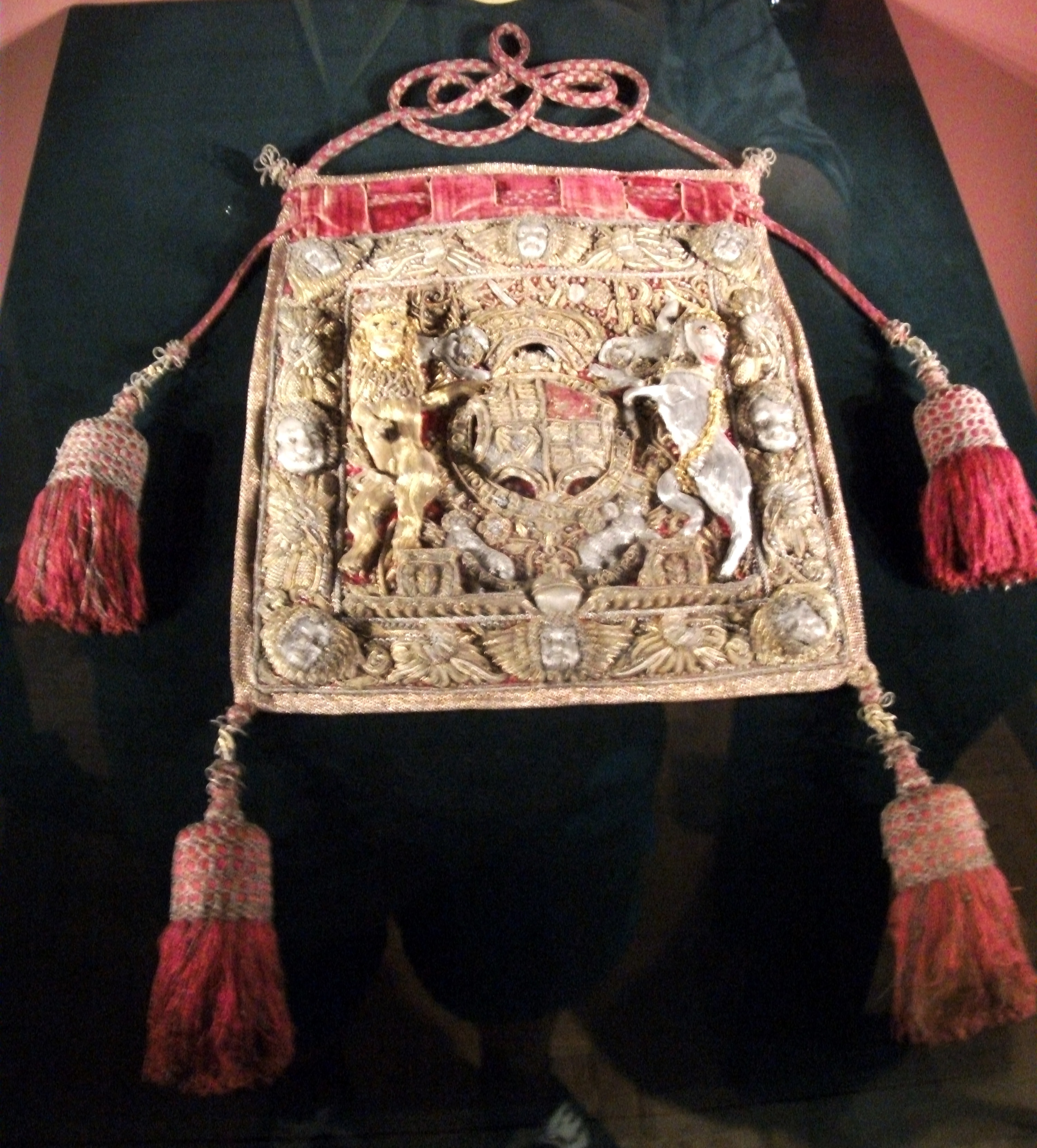
Ceremonial purse of Sir Orlando Bridgeman, Lord Keeper of the Great Seal, 1667–72, at Weston Park

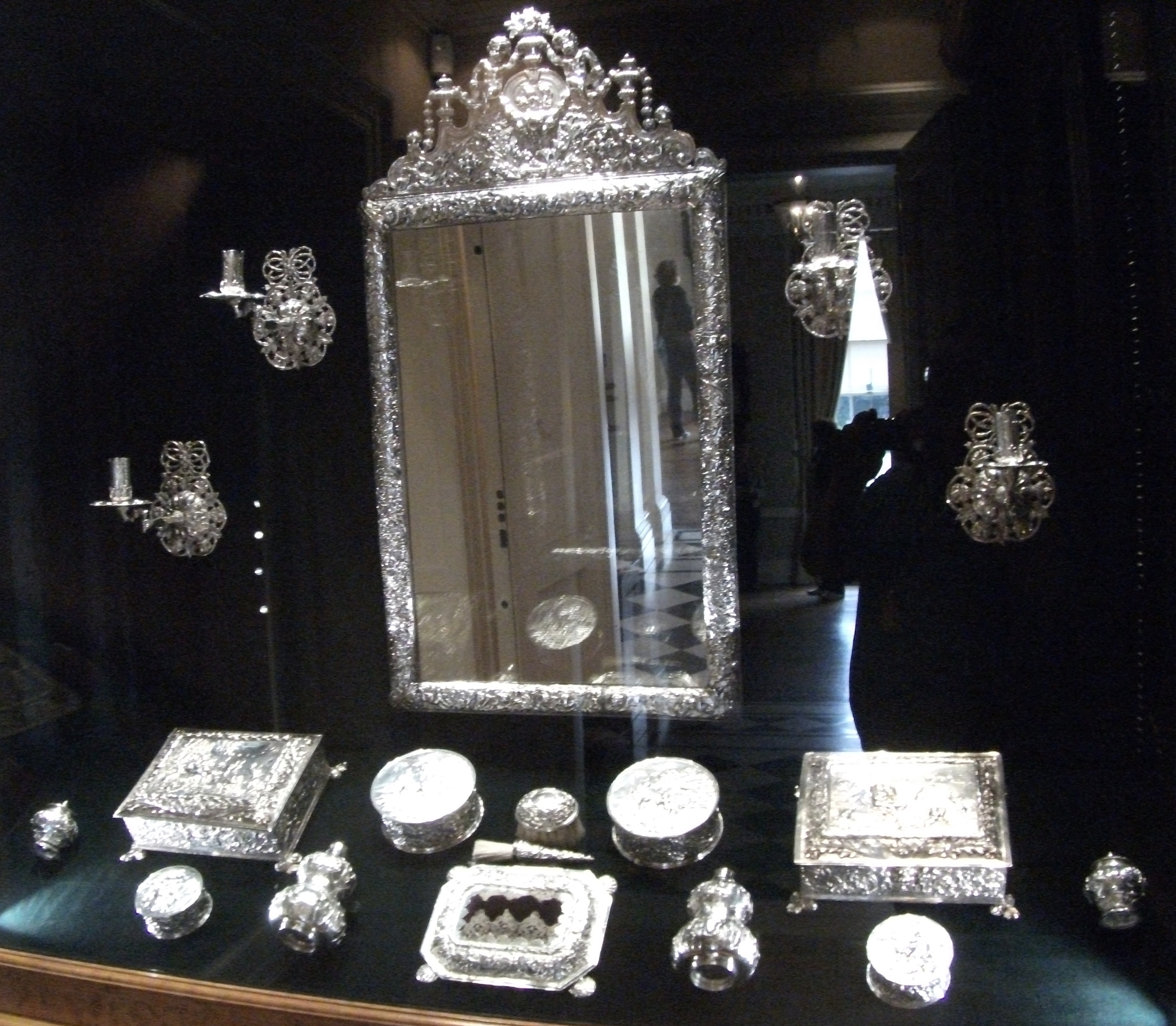
The 1679 toilet service

== See also ==
- List of Grade I listed buildings in Staffordshire
- Listed buildings in Blymhill and Weston-under-Lizard

== Sources ==
- Pevsner, Nikolaus (1974). Staffordshire. Buildings of England. London, UK: Penguin Books. ISBN 0-14-071046-9.
