= Elizabeth Wilbraham =

Elizabeth, Lady Wilbraham
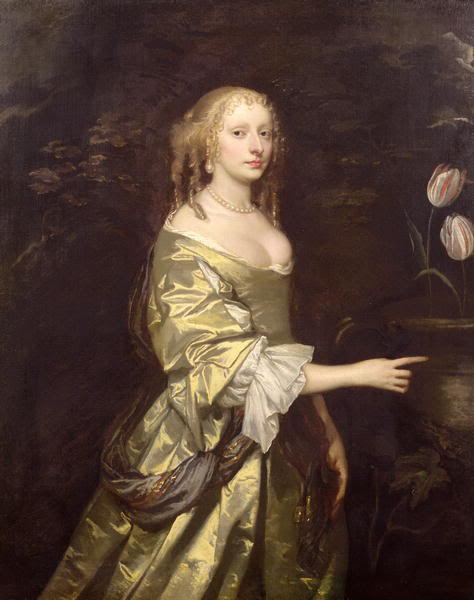
- Elizabeth Lady Wilbraham - by Sir Peter Lely
- Born: Elizabeth Mytton; 14 February 1632; Weston-under-Lizard, Staffordshire, England
- Died: 27 July 1705 (aged 73); Weston-under-Lizard, Staffordshire, England
- Occupation: Architect
- Spouse(s): Sir Thomas Wilbraham, 2nd Baronet (married c. 1651)

Elizabeth, Lady Wilbraham (née Mytton; 14 February 1632 – 27 July 1705) was a member of the English aristocracy, who traditionally has been identified as an important architectural patron.

It has been suggested that she was the first woman architect, and whose work may have been attributed to men. However, this is disputed by architectural historians.

== Early years ==
Elizabeth Mytton was born into a wealthy family and, aged 19, she married Thomas Wilbraham, heir to the Baronetcy of Wilbraham. They went on honeymoon together, travelling throughout Europe. She made this an opportunity to take an extended architectural study tour.

In the Netherlands, Elizabeth Wilbraham met architect Pieter Post, creator of the Dutch baroque style of architecture. She studied the works of Palladio in Veneto, Italy and the Stadtresidenz at Landshut, Germany.

== Personal life ==
Little is known about Lady Wilbraham's private life, but private letters were discovered and passed to the Staffordshire Record Office in 2008. These showed Lady Wilbraham's search for suitable husbands for her daughters, Grace and Margaret. According to the marketing executive of the Weston Park Foundation, "The letters explain the importance of a suitable match within the aristocracy of the day. She was certainly a very strong lady and knew what she wanted and how to get it".

== Claims that she was first known woman architect ==
Historian John Millar claims that Elizabeth Wilbraham is the first known woman architect. Millar says this follows more than 50 years of research into the subject. In 2007 the owners of the stately home, Wotton House, organised a conference to investigate who was the original architect of the building. The conference generated at least two follow-up papers: in 2010 Sir Howard Colvin proposed that John Fitch may have been the original architect, and later the same year, Millar, noting Colvin's paper, proposed Lady Wilbraham as an alternative. (Note: Colvin's paper was published in the 2010 Georgian Group Journal)

During the seventeenth century it was impossible for a woman to pursue the profession of architect, and Millar stated that Lady Wilbraham used male executant architects to supervise construction in her place. Millar believes she designed more than a dozen houses for her family and, because of the inclusion of distinctive and unusual design details, has been put forward by Millar as the designer of 18 London churches (officially attributed to Christopher Wren). Because Wren came late to architecture, Millar has suggested Elizabeth Wilbraham as his most likely tutor.

Millar has gone as far as suggesting as many as 400 buildings as possible works of Elizabeth Wilbraham. They all generally show similarities with Italian or Dutch architecture. Wilbraham owned a 1663 edition of Palladio's book I Quattro Libri (volume I) and she heavily annotated it.

In the authoritative and encyclopaedic Biographical Dictionary of British Architects 1600-1840 (4th Edn; 2008) by Sir Howard Colvin, however, she is mentioned only once. That notation is as a patroness of architecture.

In her dissertation from 2002, Canadian historian, Cynthia Hammond mentions the "awkward designations" given to Lady Wilbraham by Nikolaus Pevsner. She notes his lack in saying "by Wilbraham" to denote an eroding of Wilbraham's authorship when discussing Weston Park.

However, Millar himself admits that not a single letter or signed drawing survives with Willbraham's name on it connecting her with any project. His argument is based around the annotations in her copy of Andrea Palladio and similarities he claims to have found in buildings built at the time. His claim that she designed 400 buildings is equally based on visual similarity.

Architectural historian and Wren specialist at Cambridge, James Campbell, suggest the claims are "based mostly on imagination and speculation." The curator of Weston Park, Gareth Williams, said that no proof existed of a career as an architect.

== Notable projects ==
- Weston Park, Staffordshire (1671) - sources such as Historic England attribute the design to Elizabeth Wilbraham, but others, such as the Weston Park Foundation, press the claims of William Taylor. (Note: In support of William Taylor being the architect, the Weston Park Foundation notes the architectural similarities between the house and the Church of the Holy Trinity at Minsterley, 30 miles away across the county border in Shropshire, which is known to be by Taylor.)
- St Andrew's Church, Weston-under-Lizard - the estate church for Weston Park. Pevsner describes the church as "an enterprise of Lady Wilbraham...[of] 1700-1".
- Wotton House, Buckinghamshire (rebuilt 1704–1714) - architect unknown, but Elizabeth Wilbraham or John Fitch have been put forward.

== See also ==
- Women in architecture

== Sources ==
- Pevsner, Nikolaus (1974). Staffordshire. Buildings of England. London, UK: Penguin Books. ISBN 0-14-071046-9.
