= Haughton, Cheshire =

Village in Cheshire, England

Coordinates: 53.102°N 2.632°W

Haughton
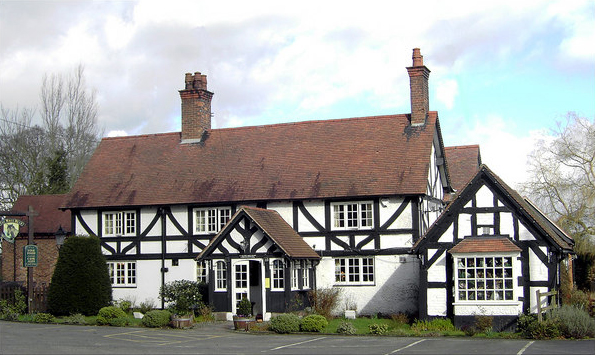
- Nag's Head, Haughton

- Location within Cheshire
- Population: 204 (2011 Census)
- OS grid reference: SJ577563
- Civil parish: Haughton
- Unitary authority: Cheshire East
- Ceremonial county: Cheshire
- Region: North West
- Country: England
- Sovereign state: United Kingdom
- Post town: TARPORLEY
- Postcode district: CW6
- Dialling code: 01829
- Police: Cheshire
- Fire: Cheshire
- Ambulance: North West
- UK Parliament: Chester South and Eddisbury

Haughton (or Haughton Moss) is a village and civil parish which lies northwest of Nantwich in the unitary authority of Cheshire East and the ceremonial county of Cheshire, England. According to the 2001 Census, its population was 223, reducing to 204 at the 2011 Census, and has four fully active farms. In the 2021 Census population was recorded as 187. Cheshire East Council issued information on the 2024 population of Haughton parish as 224 residents Cheshire East (Unitary Authority, United Kingdom) - Population Statistics, Charts, Map and Location

== Landmarks ==
The Nags Head public house, a half-timbered building dating back to 1629, is situated in the village. It closed at the end of 2019. It was purchased in February 2022 by new owners and operated as a pub and restaurant until closing in January 2025.

A war memorial mounted on a brick plinth on Long Lane was originally from neighbouring Radmore Green chapel. It was rescued by local residents Derek Rogers and Tom Dawson when the chapel was converted to a dwelling. It is dedicated to those associated with the chapel and the village, who fought in the First World War.

Every year, Haughton Hall gardens are opened to the public, featuring a medium-sized garden; filled with rhododendrons, azaleas, shrubs, a rock garden, a lake with a temple, a waterfall and a collection of ornamental trees.

== Archaeology ==
A 3 cm long silver gilt crucifix was discovered in a field near the village in 2002. The artifact, likely to have been worn around the neck on a chain, was dated as late fourteenth or early fifteenth century by experts at the British Museum.

== Governance ==
As the population is small, instead of having a parish council, the civil parish holds a regular (about four times a year) parish meeting for residents.

From 1974 the civil parish was served by Crewe and Nantwich Borough Council, which was succeeded on 1 April 2009 by the new unitary authority of Cheshire East.

== See also ==
- Listed buildings in Haughton, Cheshire
