= Listed buildings in Burland =

Burland is a former civil parish in Cheshire East, England. It contained 20 buildings that are recorded in the National Heritage List for England as designated listed buildings, all of which are at Grade II. This grade is the lowest of the three gradings given to listed buildings and is applied to "buildings of national importance and special interest". Apart from the village of Burland, the parish was rural. Most of the listed buildings are houses, cottages or farm buildings. A group of these date from the 17th century, and most of them are timber-framed. Another group was built along the Wrexham Road (the A534 road) by the Peckforton estate in Tudor style in about 1870. The Llangollen Canal passes through the parish, and two listed structures are linked with this, a bridge, and a lock. The other listed buildings are a former windmill and a signpost.

Name and location	Photograph	Date	Notes
Swanley Hall; 53.06917°N 2.57438°W	—	Early 16th century	A farmhouse that was later altered and extended. It is constructed in brick with some timber-framing, and has a concrete tiled roof. It has an L-shaped plan, is in two storeys, and has a four-bay front. There are bargeboards in the gables, and the windows are mainly casements.
Hollybank Cottage; 53.05009°N 2.56487°W		Early 17th century	The cottage is timber-framed with brick nogging, and has an asbestos cement roof. It is in two storeys. There are two 20th-century extension, giving it a T-shaped plan. The windows are casements, and there are bargeboards in the gables.
Green Farm House; 53.07915°N 2.59158°W	—	Mid-17th century	The farmhouse is in brick with a slate roof. It is in three storeys, with a three-bay front, and an extension to the rear, giving it a T-shaped plan. There is one sash window at the rear, the other windows being casements. The central doorway has pilasters, a fanlight, and an open pediment.
Farm building, Hollybank Cottage; 53.05025°N 2.56463°W		Mid-17th century	The farm building originated as a shippon. It is timber-framed with brick nogging and has a tiled roof. The building is in a single storey, and has a three-bay front. The windows are casements.
Pear Tree Farmhouse; 53.06176°N 2.57624°W		Mid-17th century	The farmhouse is timber-framed with an added brick wing. It is in two storeys, and has a four-bay front. The windows are casements. At the rear is a full-length lean-to extension. Inside is a blocked inglenook.
Rose Cottage and End Cottage; 53.06178°N 2.57693°W		Mid-17th century	A pair of timber-framed cottages with brick nogging, and a corrugated metal-sheet roof. They are in a single storey with attics. The windows are casements, those in the upper floor being in gables or in gabled dormers with bargeboards. At the rear are small lean-to porches.
Sparrows Roost; 53.06988°N 2.57115°W		Late 17th century	This is a timber-framed cottage with brick nogging on a brick plinth, and has a corrugated metal roof. It has been altered and extended. The cottage is in two storeys, and has a two-bay front with an added brick lean-to the west. The windows are casements.
Swanley Bridge; 53.06860°N 2.57249°W		c. 1793	This is Bridge No. 8 on the Llangollen Canal, and carries Springe Lane over the canal. It is built in engineering brick, and consists of a single semicircular arch. It has splayed-out abutments, splayed parapet approach roads, and a humped carriageway. On the parapets are rounded stone copings.
Swanley Lock number 2; 53.06953°N 2.57229°W		1805	A lock on the Llangollen Canal, for which the engineer was J. Fletcher, and the consultant Thomas Telford. It is constructed in brick, and has stone copings to the approach walls. The copings of the lock are mainly in concrete. The upper lock gate is in metal, and the lower gates are wooden.
Holly Tree House; 53.07463°N 2.56646°W	—	Early 19th century	A brick house with a tiled roof, it is in two storeys and has a front of three bays. At the rear is a wing giving the house a T-shaped plan. The windows are sashes under wedge lintels. The central doorway has pilasters, a fanlight, and an open pediment.
Ravensmoor Windmill; 53.07364°N 2.56398°W		Early 19th century	The former windmill is constructed in brick and consists of a circular tapering tower with a boarded roof. The original roof and sails are no longer present, and water pumping mechanism has been installed on the roof. There are windows on three levels, some of which are blocked.
Burland Cottage; 53.07595°N 2.57028°W	—	Mid-19th century	A brick cottage with a slate roof, in two storeys and with a three-bay front. Flanking the central doorway are small canted bay windows. The windows are casements with leaded lozenge glazing.
1 and 2 Tollemache Cottages; 53.07755°N 2.57631°W		c. 1870	A pair of brick cottages built for the Peckforton estate in Tudor style. They have tiled roofs, and are in 1 1/2 storeys. Each cottage has a one-bay front, and a single-storey lean-to wing containing a door. The casement windows have cast iron glazing bars around hexagonal panes, those in the upper storey being in gabled half-dormers with timber-framing and finials.
3 and 4 Tollemache Cottages; 53.07767°N 2.57720°W		c. 1870	A pair of brick cottages built for the Peckforton estate in Tudor style. They have tiled roofs, and are in two storeys. Each cottage has a one-bay front. The windows are casements with cast iron glazing bars around hexagonal panes.
5 and 6 Tollemache Cottages; 53.07778°N 2.57801°W		c. 1870	A pair of brick cottages built for the Peckforton estate in Tudor style. They have tiled roofs, and are in two storeys. The left hand cottage has a two-bay front, and the right hand cottage is in one bay with a gable. The windows are casements with cast iron glazing bars around hexagonal panes.
7 and 8 Tollemache Cottages; 53.07788°N 2.57876°W		c. 1870	A pair of brick cottages built for the Peckforton estate in Tudor style. They have tiled roofs, and are in two storeys. Each cottage has a one-bay front. The right hand cottage has a gable with a shaped purlin and a finial. The windows are casements with cast iron glazing bars around hexagonal panes.
Burland Farmhouse; 53.07655°N 2.59357°W	—	c. 1870	A brick farmhouse with a tiled roof built for the Peckforton estate. It is in two storeys, and has a three-bay front. A rear wing gives it an L-shaped plan. The central front bay projects slightly forward, and has a gable with applied timber. The windows are casements with cast-iron glazing bars around hexagonal panes.
Farm building, Burland Farmhouse; 53.07653°N 2.59313°W	—	c. 1870	The farm building is in brick with a tiled roof, forming an L-shaped plan of three and four bays. Its features include round pitch holes, and lattice casement windows in timbered gabled half-dormers.
Rose Cottages; 53.07836°N 2.58347°W	—	c. 1870	A pair of brick cottages built for the Peckforton estate in Tudor style. They have tiled roofs, and are in 1 1/2 storeys. Each cottage has a two-bay front. The casement windows have cast iron glazing bars around hexagonal panes, those in the upper storey being in gabled half-dormers with timber-framing and finials.
Signpost; 53.07801°N 2.58815°W	—	Late 19th century	The signpost is in cast iron, and consists of an octagonal post topped by a ball finial. It carries three direction indicators inscribed with the distances in miles to nearby places.
