= Brick nog =

Construction technique

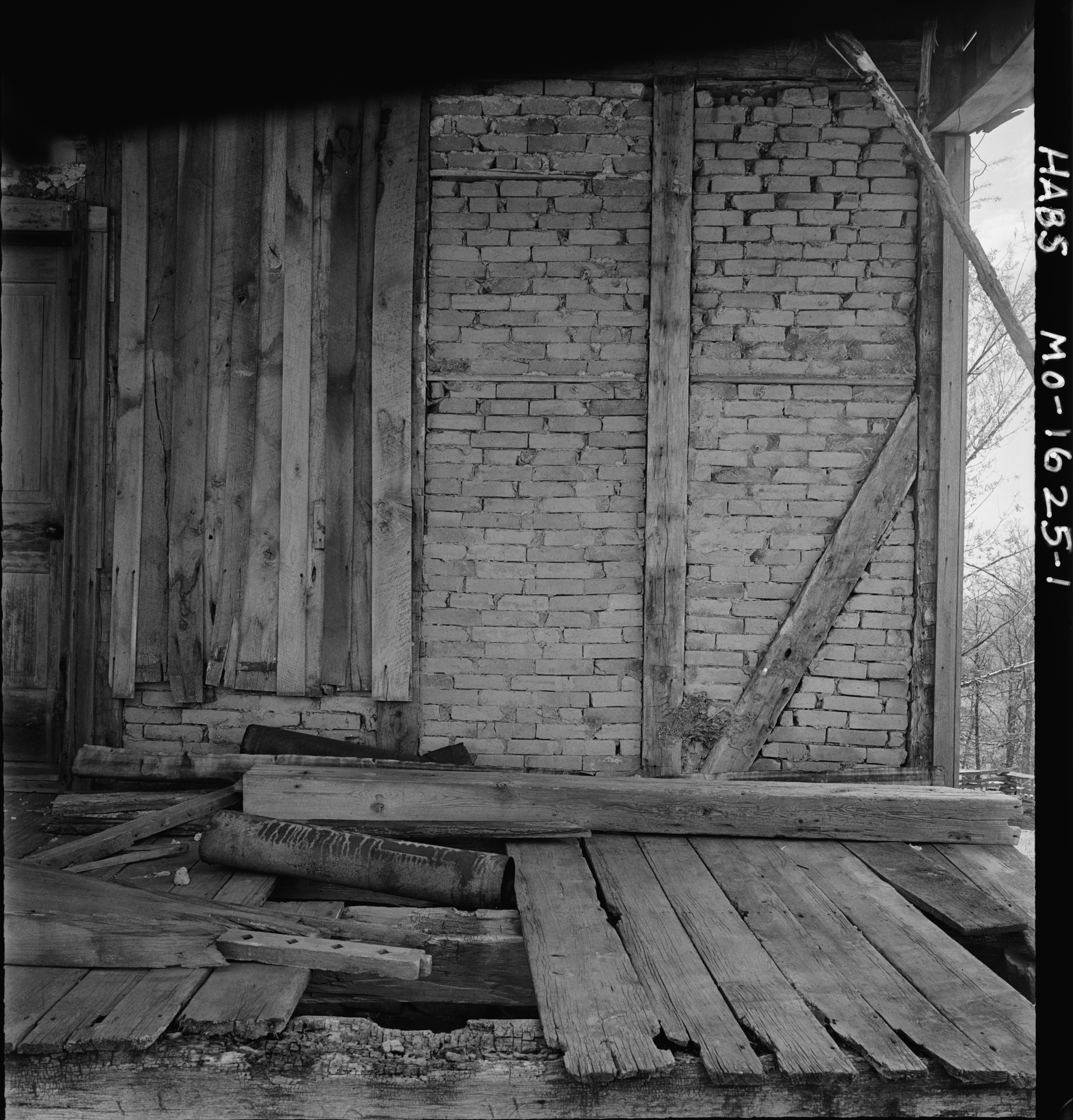
Typical brick nogging for walls in the United States.

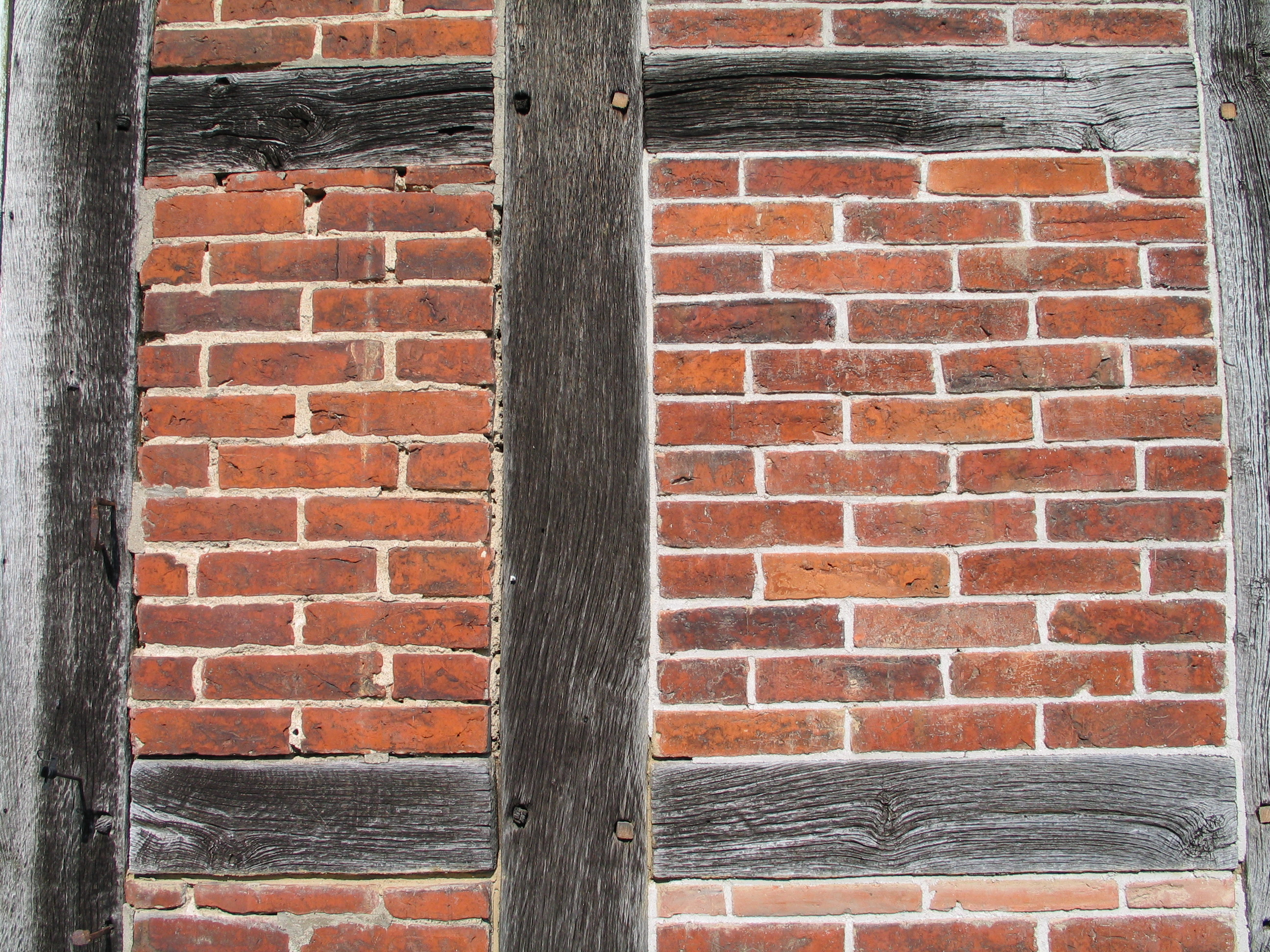
Brick infill in half-timbered construction

Brick nog (nogging or nogged, beam filling) is a construction technique in which bricks are used to fill the gaps in a wooden frame. Such walls may then be covered with tile, weatherboards, or rendering, or the brick may remain exposed on the interior or exterior of the building.

The technique was developed in England from the late 15th to early 16th century, developing out of methods such as wattle and daub and lath and plaster construction, with the bricks being laid in horizontal courses or a herringbone pattern.

Brick used in this way is rarely mechanically fastened to the adjacent wood members, generally being held in place only by the mortar bonds and friction. It is an integral part of the building structure that can also serve as fireproofing, soundproofing, or the final exposed surface of the assembly.

Generally, the term brick infill is used instead of nogging in half-timbered construction, and the word nog or noggin has also come to be used to describe timber bracing pieces between wall studs in timber frame construction.
