= Acton, Cheshire (ancient parish) =

Coordinates: 53.074°N 2.550°W

Acton was an ancient parish in the Nantwich Hundred of Cheshire, England.

At one time it included the townships of Acton, Aston juxta Mondrum, Austerson, Baddington, Brindley, Burland, Cholmondeston, Edleston, Faddiley, Henhull, Hurleston, Poole, Stoke, Worleston, most of Coole Pilate, parts of Dodcott cum Wilkesley, Newhall and Sound, and possibly all or part of Baddiley. It also contained the chapelries of Church Minshull, Nantwich and Wrenbury. By around 1870, the townships and chapelries of Baddiley, Church Minshull, Dodcott cum Wilkesley, Nantwich, Newhall, Sound and Wrenbury had been lost from Acton; the total area of the ancient parish was then 15,542 acres (6,290 hectares), with a population of 3,125.

Acton church served as the main parish church for a wide area to the west of Nantwich. Subsidiary churches were chapels of ease; St Mary's Church, Nantwich, for example, despite its size, remained a chapel of ease to Acton until the 17th century.
