= Acton, Cheshire =

Village in Cheshire, England

Coordinates: 53.073117°N 2.548588°W

Acton
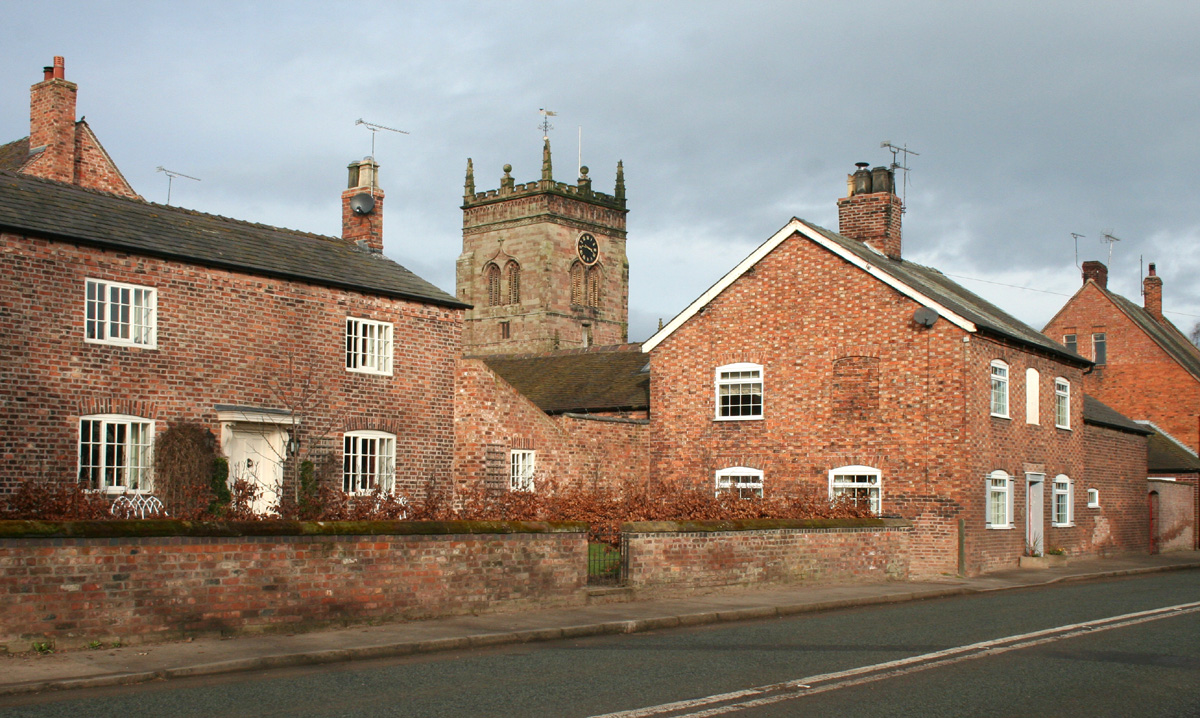
- Acton village centre

- Location within Cheshire
- Population: 404 (including Henhull, 2011)
- OS grid reference: SJ632530
- Civil parish: Burland and Acton
- Unitary authority: Cheshire East
- Ceremonial county: Cheshire
- Region: North West
- Country: England
- Sovereign state: United Kingdom
- Post town: NANTWICH
- Postcode district: CW5
- Dialling code: 01270
- Police: Cheshire
- Fire: Cheshire
- Ambulance: North West
- UK Parliament: Chester South and Eddisbury

Acton is a small village and former civil parish, now in the parish of Burland and Acton, lying immediately west of the town of Nantwich, in the unitary authority area of Cheshire East and the ceremonial county of Cheshire, England. The civil parish covered 762 acres (3.08 km^{2}) and also included the small settlement of Dorfold and part of Burford, with an estimated population of 340 in 2006. It is administered jointly with the adjacent civil parishes of Henhull and Edleston. Historically, Acton refers to a township and also to an ancient parish in the Nantwich Hundred covering a wide area to the west of Nantwich. The area is agricultural, with dairy farming the main industry. Around a third of the area falls within the Dorfold Estate. Historically, agriculture was the major employer, but it has now been overtaken by the service industries, with many residents commuting significant distances outside the parish to work.

The civil parish is believed to have been inhabited since the 8th or 9th century. Acton appears in the Domesday Book of 1086, when it was one of the wealthiest townships in the Nantwich Hundred, being valued for the same sum as Nantwich. The name means "oak town", referring to the pedunculate oaks that predominated in the adjacent Forest of Mondrem. During the Civil War, the village was taken by siege several times. The Shropshire Union Canal reached the parish in 1835, using a long embankment to avoid Dorfold Park. The parish contains many historic buildings, including two listed at grade I: Dorfold Hall was considered by Nikolaus Pevsner to be one of the two finest Jacobean houses in Cheshire, while St Mary's Church has a tower dating from the 13th century, one of the earliest in the county.

== History ==
=== Early history ===
The civil parish of Acton was on the eastern edge of the Forest of Mondrem in the Bronze Age, giving rise to the name Actune, meaning "oak town", for the predominant pedunculate oaks. A Roman road from Middlewich to Whitchurch passed immediately to the north of the parish, but there is little evidence of settlement. An area north of Acton village was enclosed in the 8th and 9th centuries, and ancient field systems can be discerned elsewhere in this and the adjacent modern civil parishes.

Acton appears in the Domesday Book of 1086; it was held by Earl Morcar before the Conquest and afterwards by William Malbank, first baron of Wich Malbank (Nantwich). One of the largest and wealthiest townships in the Nantwich Hundred, the Domesday Book mentions a manor, mill, land for thirty ploughs, 10 acres of meadow, a strip of woodland 6 leagues in length, a hawk's eyrie and a salt house in Nantwich. The total value before 1066 was £10; for comparison, Nantwich was then valued at the same sum. Acton had one of the largest areas of meadow in Cheshire at this time. The survey also mentions two priests in Acton but no church.

Dorfold or Deofold means "cattle enclosure" or "deer park". It does not appear in the Domesday survey, but according to some sources Edwin, Earl of Mercia, elder brother of Earl Morcar and brother-in-law to Harold II, had a hall there before the Conquest. A manor at Dorfold is recorded in Henry III's reign (1216–72).

The church at Acton and its subsidiary chapels at Wrenbury, Church Minshull and Nantwich, together with some ploughland, were given to the abbot of the Cistercian Combermere Abbey at its foundation in 1133 by Hugh Malbank, second baron of Wich Malbank. The abbey received tithes from Acton and monks gave services in the church. It is unclear when this church was built; the present church originates in the 13th century, with some authorities giving a date as early as 1180.

Anglo-Saxon carvings incorporated into its foundations suggest, however, that an earlier, possibly timber, church occupied the same site. Priests are listed in parish records from 1288. The church was the main parish church for a wide area to the west of Nantwich in the ancient parish of Acton. Subsidiary churches were chapels of ease; St Mary's Church, Nantwich, for example, despite its size, remained a chapel of ease to Acton until the 17th century. At the Dissolution in 1538, the abbey's land passed to the Cotton family; the tithes and advowson were sold to Sir Richard Wilbraham (MP) in 1544, and later passed to the Tollemache family.

Early land usage was mainly agricultural and forestry, with wood being used as fuel for salt production in nearby Nantwich. As deforestation continued throughout the Middle Ages, animal husbandry and cereal production grew in importance, and by the end of the sixteenth century, the forest had largely been cleared. Landowners of Acton and Dorfold during this period include the Vernon, Littlebury, Wettenhall, Arderne, Davenport and Bromley families.

=== Civil War ===
In 1602, the Dorfold Estate was purchased by Sir Roger Wilbraham, a prominent lawyer who served as Solicitor-general for Ireland under Elizabeth I and held positions at court under James I. Dorfold Hall was constructed in 1616–21 for his younger brother and heir, Ralph Wilbraham, on the site of the earlier hall.

During the Civil War, Acton village was taken by siege several times. In the year 1641 Edward Burghall, the vicar Acton for some of the Civil War, first notices political events, and afterwards gives a very detailed account of the military operations in Cheshire. The reason was that John, Lord Byron took his church at Acton and made it a base of Royalist operations for the siege of Nantwich. The Battle of Nantwich of 1644 took place adjacent to the village.

=== 18th century to the present day ===
In 1754, the Dorfold Estate was sold to Nantwich lawyer James Tomkinson, originally from Bostock. The Chester to Nantwich branch of what later became known as the Shropshire Union Canal was completed in 1774, ending just north of the parish at Basin End; the Nantwich to Birmingham section was completed in 1835. The Tomkinson family objected to the route of the latter, leading to the construction of a half-mile embankment including an aqueduct to avoid the Dorfold Park. With the availability of canal and railway transport during the 18th and 19th centuries, the main produce of the area changed from cheese to milk, and dairy became the major industry.

The Dorfold Estate passed back to descendants of the Wilbraham family in 1861 on inheritance by Anne Tollemache, the wife of Wilbraham Spencer Tollemache, who served as High Sheriff of Cheshire in 1865. The grounds of the hall were remodelled in 1861–2, with the construction of several buildings including the gate lodge. The present owners, the Roundells, are descendants of the Tollemaches via Julia Tollemache, daughter of Wilbraham and Anne Tollemache and wife of Charles Savile Roundell.

A parish hall was built in 1909 by local subscription, and served as an auxiliary military hospital for twenty convalescents during the First World War. Mains electricity arrived in the area in 1932. Acton village suffered bombing during the Second World War, particularly during one night in late 1940; there were no fatalities. Refugees, mainly from Liverpool, were housed in Acton, and Dorfold Park was used as a camp for American soldiers from November 1940.

== Governance ==
Acton has been administered since 1965 by Acton, Edleston & Henhull Parish Council, jointly with the adjacent civil parishes of Henhull and Edleston; there are five councillors for Acton and one for each of Henhull and Edleston. Prior to 1965, Acton had a separate parish council. On 1 April 2023 the parish was abolished to form "Burland and Acton".

From 1974 to 2009, the Borough Council was Crewe and Nantwich, having previously been administered within Nantwich Rural Sanitary District (1875–94) and Nantwich Rural District (1894–1974). Since 1 April 2009 it has been part of the unitary authority of Cheshire East.

Acton falls in the Chester South and Eddisbury parliamentary constituency, represented since the 2024 general election by Aphra Brandreth of the Conservative Party. It was previously part of the Eddisbury constituency, which since its establishment in 1983 had been held by the Conservative MPs Alastair Goodlad (1983–99), Stephen O'Brien (1999–2015), Antoinette Sandbach (2015–19) and Edward Timpson (2019–24).

== Geography and economy ==
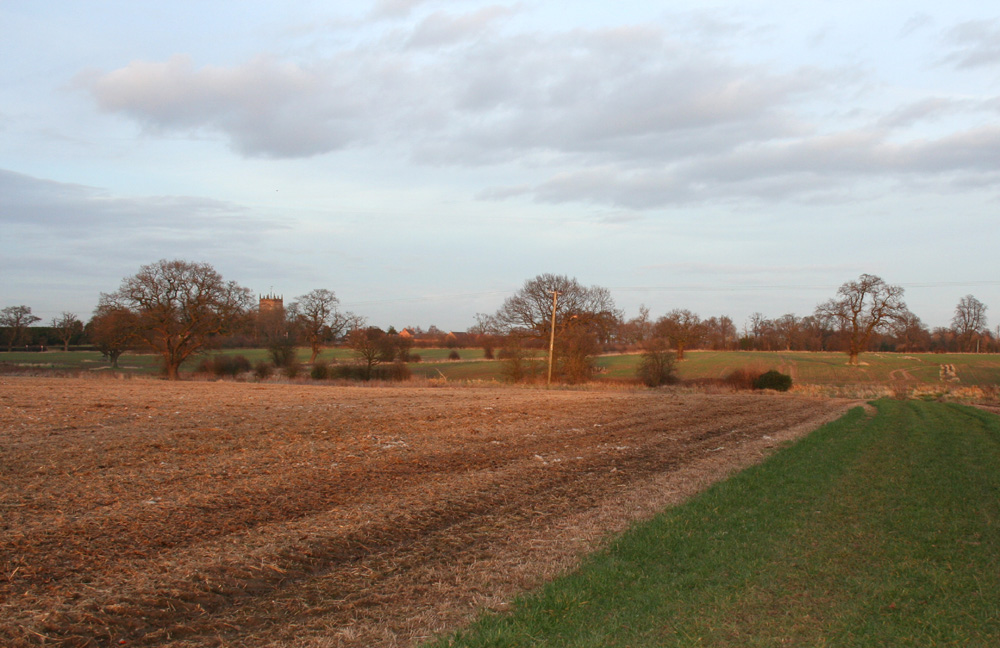
Farmland near Madam's Farm

The village of Acton (SJ632530) lies on the A534 (Chester Road) 2¼ km (1½ miles) north west of the centre of Nantwich and 7¾ km (4¾ miles) south west of Crewe. The civil parish of Acton has a total area of 762 acres (3.08 km^{2}), and also includes the small settlement of Dorfold, focused around Dorfold Hall (SJ635525), as well as part of Burford, located around the A51–A534 crossroads (SJ629539); Burford also falls partly in Henhull civil parish. Nearby villages include Burland (to the west), Ravensmoor (south west) and Rease Heath (north east).

The majority of buildings throughout the civil parish are in red brick with slate roofs, with occasional "black and white" half-timbered buildings, as well as the sandstone parish church. Much of Acton village dates from the 17th–19th centuries, centering on the church which dates originally from the 13th century. Fourteen council houses were built after the Second World War in Acton village to the east of the A534, and this development was subsequently expanded with a mix of semi-detached houses and terraced bungalows, the total now numbering some fifty dwellings. In the 2001 census, 65% of dwellings in the civil parish were described as semi-detached or terraced.

The area is relatively flat, with an average elevation of around 50–60 metres. The high point is 61 metres at Acton village; the low point is 43 metres at Nantwich Aqueduct. The geology is Keuper marl, with glacial sand deposit underlying Acton village; glacial boulders originating in Cumbria, such as the Bluestone, are occasionally uncovered. Outside Acton village settlement is sparse, and over 90% of the Acton, Henhull and Edleston combined area of 765 hectares (1890 acres) is open land. The predominant land usage is agricultural, mainly dairy with some arable, predominantly fodder crops and cereals. The Dorfold Estate (125.5 hectares; 310.1 acres) comprises around a third of the civil parish, and includes farmhouses, farmland, gardens, woodland and historic parkland. Around 3 hectares (7.4 acres) of semi-natural woodland within the park are believed to be ancient; other woodland includes Bull's Wood (SJ635519) and several immature plantations. Dorfold Park has a lake, and many smaller meres and ponds are scattered across the farmland. The main line of the Shropshire Union Canal runs broadly north–south to the east of the parish, with a short embanked section (around 300 metres) south of Nantwich Aqueduct falling within the parish boundary. Ravensmoor Brook runs north–south along the western boundary of the parish, and an unnamed brook runs north–south from Burford to just south of Monks Lane.

Historically, agriculture was the major employment sector; in 1831, for example, 63.9% of men over 20 were farmers or agricultural labourers. By the 2001 census, however, agriculture had been replaced by the service industries. The relatively high average distance travelled to work (17.5 km; 10.9 miles) reported in 2001 suggests that few residents were employed locally and many commuted significant distances to work.

== Demography ==
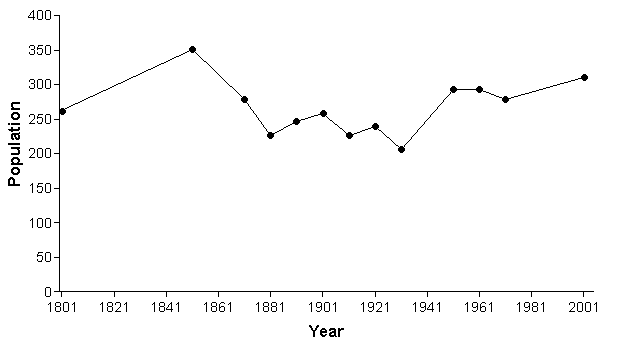
Population in Acton civil parish since 1801

In 2017, there were 143 households in the civil parish. In 2006, the total population of the civil parish was estimated as 340. In the 2001 census, the recorded population was 311. Although this represents an increase of around 20% from 1901, the population remains below the 1851 figure (see graph). In 2001, 53.7% of the population were female and 98.4% of householders were white. Residents had an average (median) age of 38.0 years, with 23.2% aged under 16 and 12.2% aged 75 and over. The parish had a total of 124 dwellings, with an average household size of 2.55. 65.3% of dwellings were owner occupied; 21.0% were rented from the council or a housing association and 12.1% from a private landlord. 77.9% of households owned one or more cars. Of those aged 16–74, 45.3% held few or no academic qualifications (less than five GCSE passes or equivalent). According to the census, 1.5% of those aged 16–74 were unemployed and 27.9% were economically inactive.

== Dorfold Estate ==
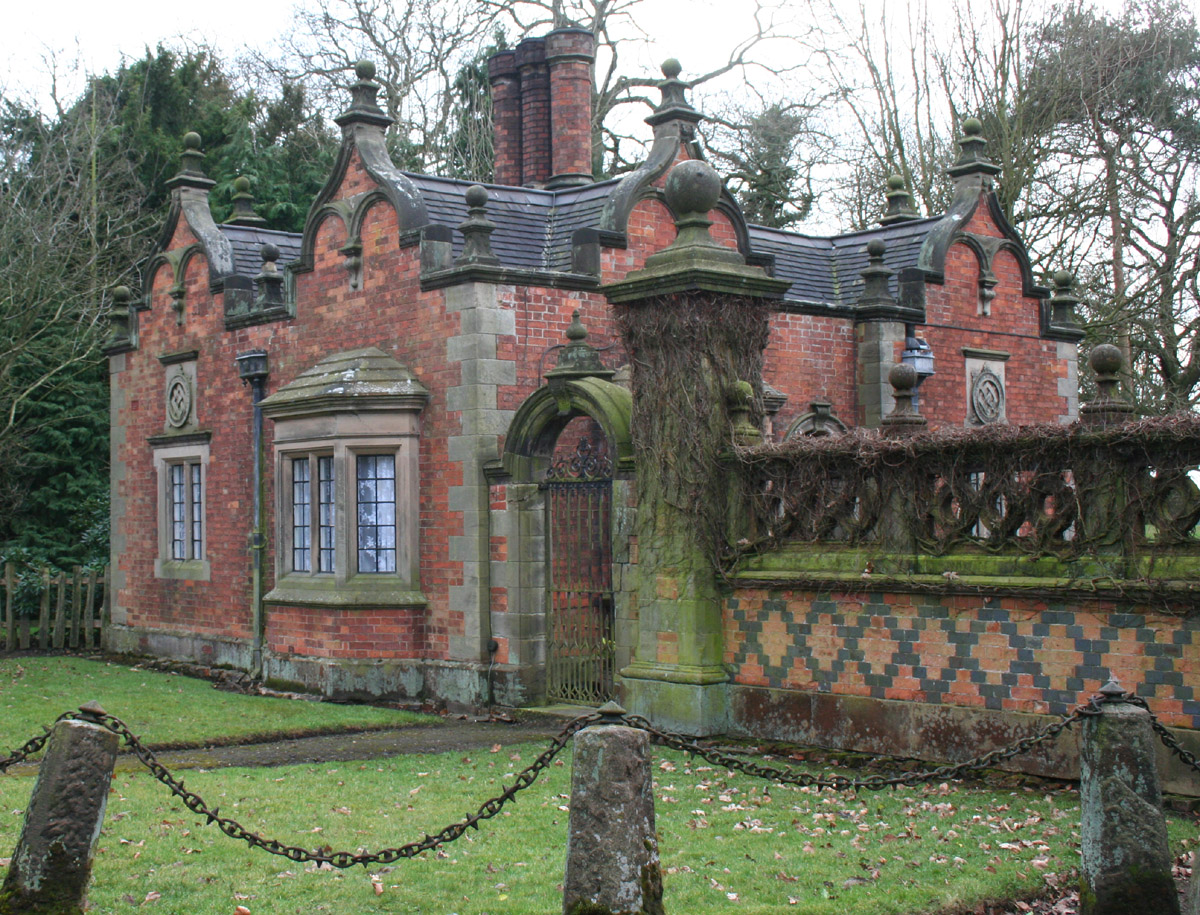
Gate lodge of Dorfold Hall

The Jacobean mansion Dorfold Hall (SJ635525) was built in 1616–21 for Ralph Wilbraham; it is listed at grade I. A two-storey building on a double-pile plan in red brick with stone dressings, the main façade features a recessed centre with two small wings and large windows. The hall and gardens are open to the public one afternoon weekly from April to October.

The entire estate is listed on the National Register of Historic Parks and Gardens. The grounds, remodelled to a design by William Andrews Nesfield in 1861–2, contain 7.5 hectares (18 acres) of gardens including a modern woodland garden. A grade-II*-listed gateway now situated in the wall to the west of the hall formerly belonged to Roger Wilbraham's almshouses in Nantwich, which were demolished in 1872. The wrought-iron gate features a sun motif with scrolls; it stands in a moulded stone opening flanked by niches containing busts and surmounted by lions.

Several other buildings within the park are listed at grade II. The oldest of these is an icehouse with a circular brick-lined underground chamber which probably dates from the late 18th century. Several structures that are now listed date from the 1861–2 works to the grounds. The Jacobean-style gate lodge on Chester Road is in red brick with stone dressings and blue brick decoration. The clock tower over the carriage house features stone frames to the clock dials and is topped by a wooden finial with a weather vane. A large iron statue of a mastiff with puppies oversetting a food bowl stands in the forecourt of the hall; it is attributed to Pierre Louis Rouillard and came from the Paris Exhibition of 1855.

== Other landmarks ==
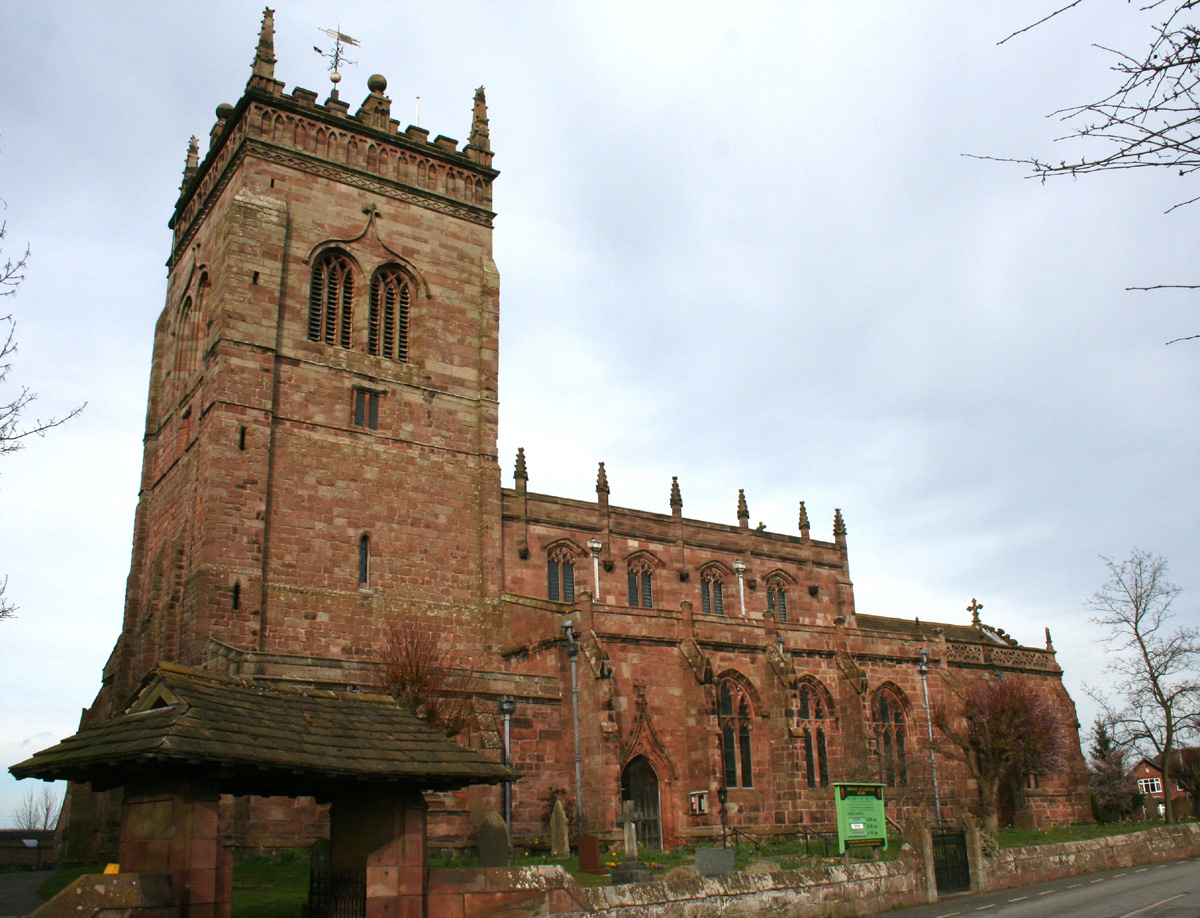
St Mary's Church

=== St Mary's Church ===
The red sandstone parish church is dedicated to St Mary the Virgin; it is listed at grade I. The tower dates originally from the 13th century, or a little earlier, and is one of the earliest in Cheshire. Much of the remainder of the church dates from the 15th century, although the chantry was endowed in 1398 and the north aisle windows are 14th century. In 1757, the top of the tower collapsed during a storm and was rebuilt 4 metres (13 ft) shorter in Early Gothic Revival style. The interior features carvings thought to date from the late 10th century, a Norman font, a stone bench around the walls, monuments to Sir William Mainwaring and Sir Richard Wilbraham and his wife, as well as Victorian stained glass by Charles Kempe.

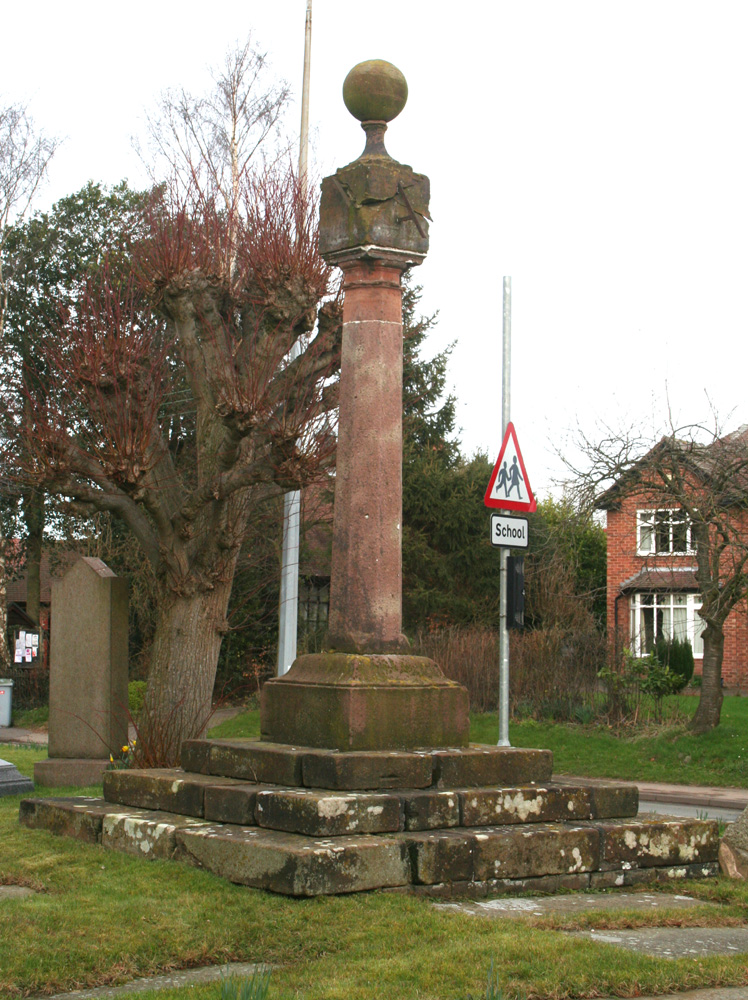
Sundial

A sundial dating from the late 17th century stands in the churchyard; it is mentioned in records of 1704 and is known to have been moved sometime after 1774. Of an unusual construction, with a long octagonal shaft capped with a ball finial, the sundial is believed to have originated as a medieval cross, perhaps destroyed under the Puritan government. It was originally decorated, with the ball being painted as a globe and the shaft having gold and black banding, and bore the twin inscriptions "Tempus Fugit: Mors Venit (Time flies, death comes)" and "Ut Hora: Sic Vita (As the hour, so life)". It is grade II listed and also designated a Scheduled Ancient Monument. Cricketer and rugby player A. N. Hornby is buried in the churchyard; his grave features a carving of a wicket, bat and ball in marble.

St Mary's has been administered since 1991 as a united benefice, the Cross Country Group of Parish Churches, with St Bartholomew's, Church Minshull, St Oswald's, Worleston and St David's, Wettenhall. It falls into the rural deanery of Nantwich and the diocese of Chester. Since 2007, the vicar has been the Reverend Peter Lillicrap. A magazine, Cross Country, is circulated across all four churches.

=== Acton village ===
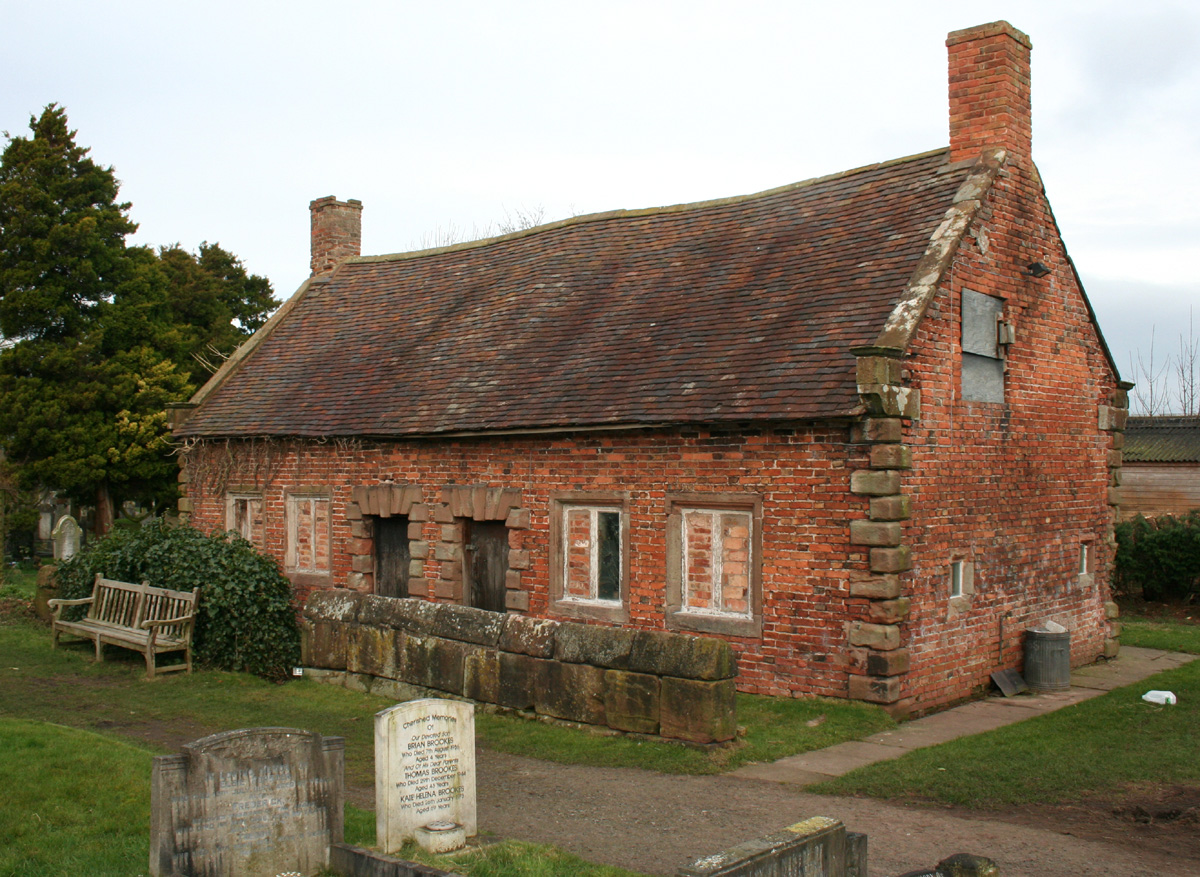
Almshouses in churchyard

The centre of Acton village has been designated a conservation area and contains several historic buildings. Apart from the church, the oldest buildings are a pair of grade-II-listed red-brick almshouses in the churchyard which were built by Sir Roger Wilbraham in 1613. The black-and-white Star Inn dates from the late 17th century and is grade II listed. The Glebe House on Monks Lane, once the vicarage, is a handsome three-storey, five-bay building in red brick with massive chimney stacks, built in 1723–27; it is listed at grade II*.

Other grade-II-listed buildings include Church Farm House and Star Cottages; both are in red brick and date from the early 19th century. Opposite St Mary's Church stands a grade-II-listed red telephone box which was installed in 1940. It is of the 1935 K6 type, designed by Giles Gilbert Scott.

=== Elsewhere in the civil parish ===
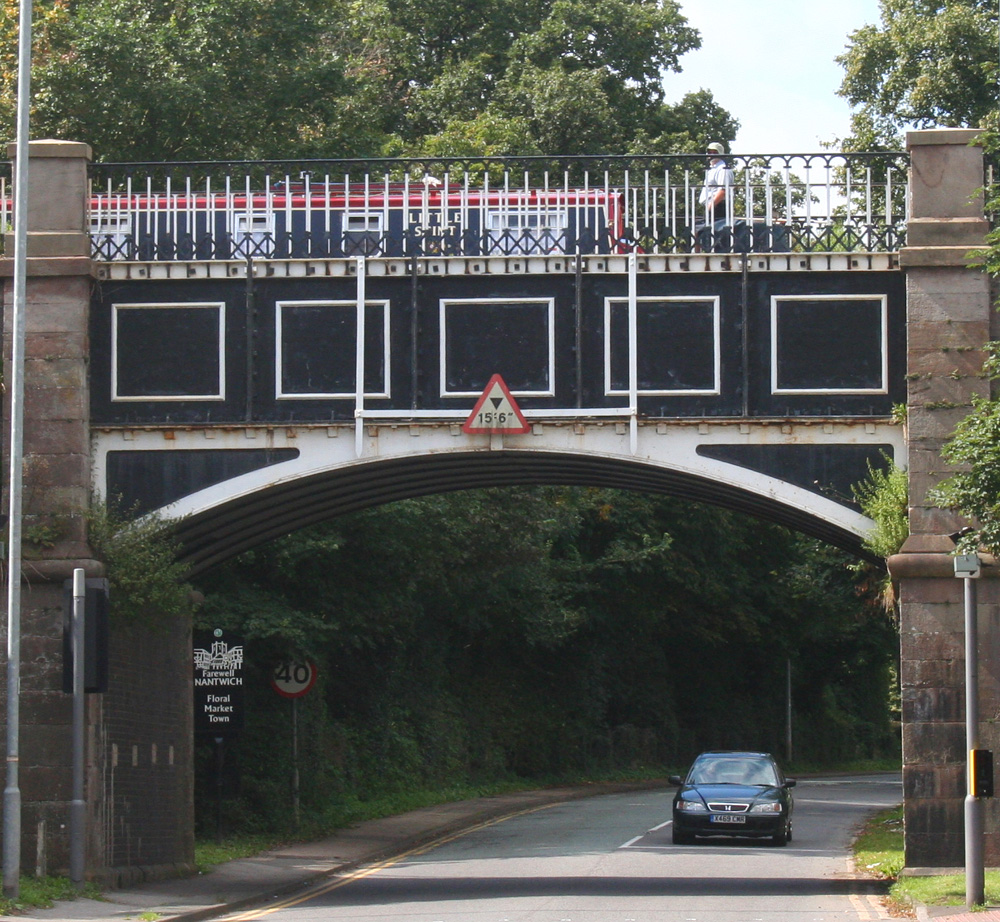
Nantwich Aqueduct

The Nantwich Aqueduct (SJ642545) carries the Shropshire Union Canal over the Chester to Nantwich road (A534) near the eastern boundary of the civil parish. Constructed in around 1826 by Thomas Telford, the aqueduct has a single five-panelled arch and water trough with a balustrade, all in cast iron, carried by stone supports with pilasters. It is listed at grade II*.

Dorfold Dairy House (SJ631518) was formerly the Dorfold Estate's home farm; a three-storey, three-bay, U-shaped building in red brick dating from the late 17th century, it is listed at grade II*. The adjacent red-brick farm building is grade II listed. Madam's Farm (SJ625526) off Raven's Lane was the former dower house of the Hall; a three-storey, three-bay, T-shaped building in red brick dating from the late 18th century, it is listed at grade II. Other grade-II-listed buildings within the parish include the black-and-white Cuckoo Cottage (SJ625535) on Cuckoo Lane just north of Acton Grange, dating from the late 17th century, an unnamed red-brick cottage (SJ628539) by the Burford crossroads, dating from the early 19th century, and the Old Farmhouse, Village Farm. The unlisted Dorfold Cottage (SJ625530) is a Victorian house featuring a castellated tower and Gothic stucco-work on the interior.

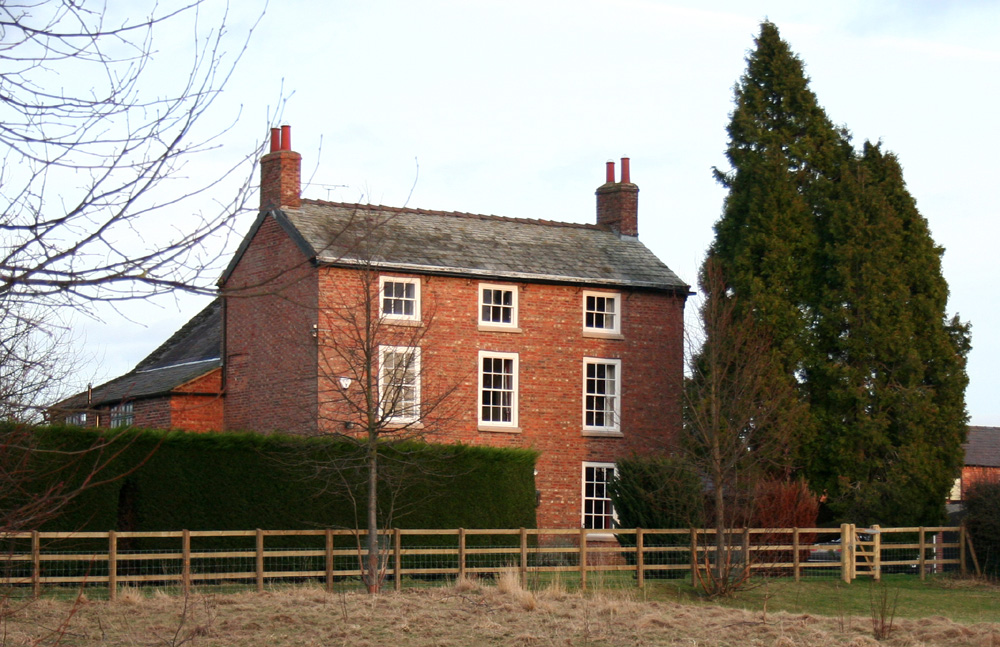
Madam's Farm

A moated enclosure (SJ62925315) is located just outside Acton village, to the west of St Mary's Church; it is a Scheduled Ancient Monument. Believed to represent the site of a medieval vicarage, it consists of a square moat surrounding a raised island, and is the only local example to be filled with water. The Bluestone is a granite boulder glacial deposit situated near the Burford crossroads, which was unearthed during road building and is believed to originate from Cumbria. The name is thought to derive from blue porphyritic crystals, which are no longer visible. A local legend suggests that the boulder was thrown at Acton church from Bickerton Hill by the Devil. The stone gives its name to the small settlement of Bluestone in Henhull civil parish.

== Transport ==
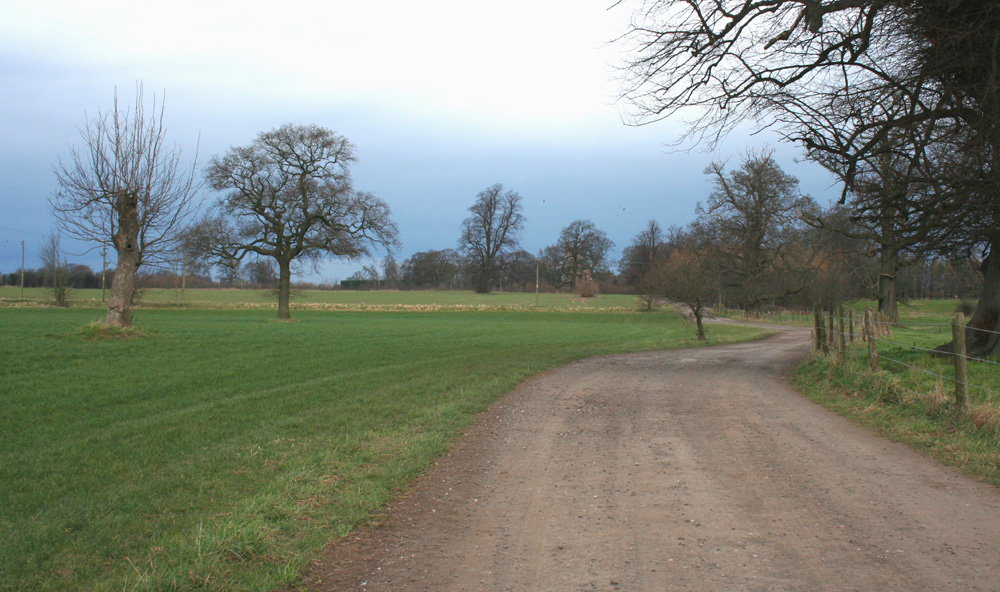
Crewe and Nantwich Circular Walk at Dorfold

The A534 (Chester Road) runs along the eastern boundary of the parish, cutting inwards at Acton village; it connects with the A51 at the Burford crossroads. It was estimated in 2005 that 3400 vehicles passed through the village daily on this road. The A534 (Cuckoo Lane) runs along the northern boundary. Monks Lane runs east–west from Acton village, and is commonly used as a cut off to the A534 (Cuckoo Lane). Marsh Lane, from Ravensmoor to Nantwich, runs on the southern boundary of the parish, with Dig Lane connecting it to Ravens Lane in Burland parish.

Acton is served by buses running between Crewe, Nantwich and Chester. In a 2005 survey (also including residents of Henhull and Edleston), 42% of respondents indicated that they used this bus service at least twice a month. However, in the 2001 census, no Acton residents stated that they used public transport to travel to work.

The parish is reasonably well served with public footpaths, particularly in the north–south direction. The most frequently used are the Crewe and Nantwich Circular Walk and the towpath of the Shropshire Union Canal, both broadly north–south, and an east–west path that connects Acton village with Swanley.

== Education and public services ==
Acton Church of England Primary School in Acton village opened in 1843 and was extended in 1988. A Church of England controlled school, it serves Acton as well as the nearby areas of Baddiley North, Brindley, Burland, Edleston, Faddiley, Henhull, Ravensmoor, Swanley and Woodhey. As of 2005, there were 127 pupils. Acton civil parish falls within the catchment area of Malbank School and Sixth Form College in Nantwich.

The nearest NHS hospital is Leighton Hospital near Crewe, administered by the Mid Cheshire Hospitals NHS Trust. Policing is provided by the Nantwich Neighbourhood Policing Unit, within the Eastern Area of Cheshire Constabulary, ambulances by North West Ambulance Service, and fire and rescue by Cheshire Fire and Rescue Service, with the nearest fire station being in Nantwich.

== Culture and community ==
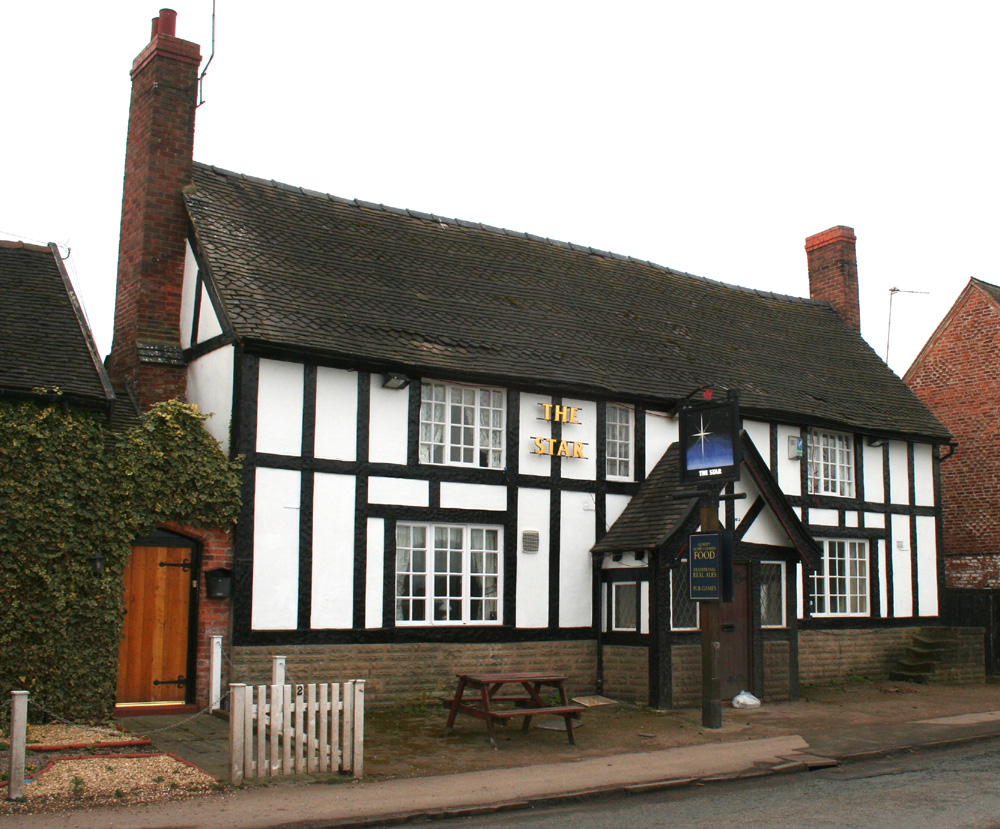
Star Inn (now a private house)

The parish hall in Acton village was built in 1909 and has been recently updated and extended. It forms a venue for theatrical and operatic performances, and also provides a meeting place for many local organisations. The Star Inn, until its closure, was another important meeting place. The mobile library service visits Acton village weekly. As of 2005, there were no general stores, post offices, police stations or health centres within the civil parish; the nearest facilities are in Nantwich.

Dorfold Hall Park hosts the annual Nantwich and South Cheshire Show, a single-day agricultural show with trade stalls and ring displays organised by the Nantwich Agricultural Society. In 2006, the event drew an estimated 32,000 visitors. The show includes the Nantwich International Cheese Awards, established in 1897 and claimed to be the largest cheese exhibition in Europe. The 2007 Cheese Show attracted 2250 entries from around 24 countries.

== Notable residents ==
Edward Burghall (1600–1665), vicar of St Mary's (1646–1662), was the author of Providence Improved, a diary of 1628–1663, an important document in the history of Puritanism. Joseph Partridge (1724–1796), schoolmaster of Acton free grammar school (1766–1772), was the author of the first history of Nantwich. Alethea Lewis (1749–1827), who was born in Acton, wrote essays and novels exploring Christian themes, many under the penname "Eugenia de Acton".

Sir Roger Wilbraham (1553–1616), who purchased the Dorfold estate in 1602, was a prominent English lawyer who served as Solicitor-General for Ireland under Elizabeth I and held positions at court under James I. He founded almshouses in St Mary's churchyard in 1613. Henry James Tollemache (1846–1939) of Dorfold Hall was the Conservative MP for West Cheshire (1881–1885) and Eddisbury (1885–1906). The current owner of the hall, Richard Roundell (b. 1944), is the deputy chairman of Christie's and served as High Sheriff of Cheshire in 1984. His daughter, Laura (b. 1972), a former model and fashion editor of Harper's Bazaar, married William Cavendish, photographer and heir to the 12th Duke of Devonshire, in 2007.

== See also ==
- Listed buildings in Acton, Cheshire
