= Swanley, Cheshire =

Hamlet in Cheshire, England

Coordinates: 53.06657°N 2.57153°W

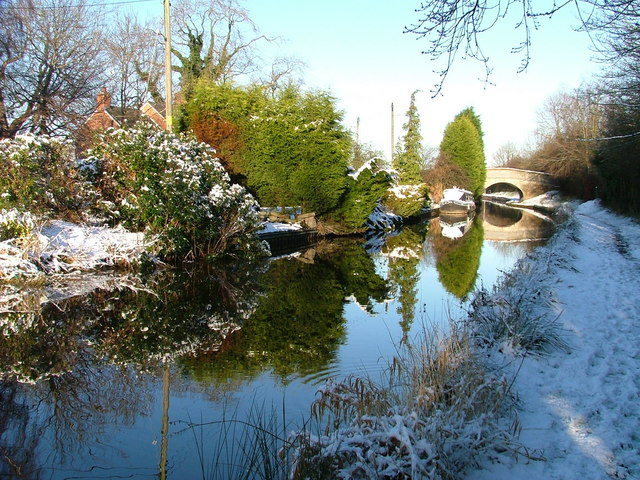
Llangollen Canal at Swanley; Swanley Bridge is in the distance

Swanley is a hamlet at SJ618523 in the unitary authority of Cheshire East and the ceremonial county of Cheshire, England. It mainly falls within the civil parish of Burland, with a part in Baddiley. Swanley lies around 2 1/2 miles (4.0 km) to the west of Nantwich and immediately north of the hamlet of Stoneley Green. Nearby villages include Burland, Acton and Ravensmoor. A dry moated site is located near the 16th-century Swanley Hall, and there are two 17th-century buildings. The Llangollen Canal runs through the hamlet, with two locks, two bridges and a marina.

== Geography and transport ==
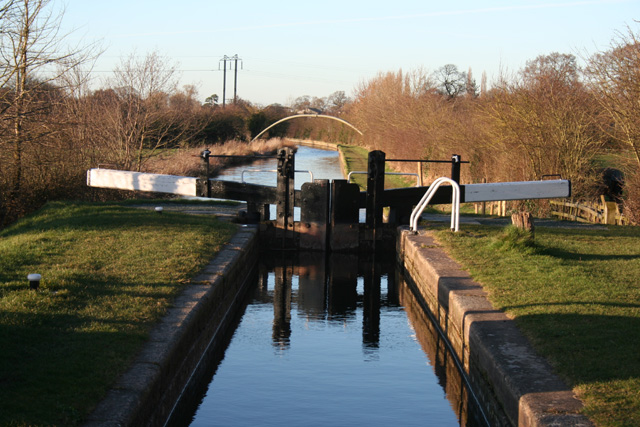
Swanley Lock No. 2

Swanley is centred at SJ618523 on the T-junction between Swanley Lane and Springe Lane, where Swanley Lane bends to the north east, at an elevation of 60–65 metres (197–213 ft). The mainly linear settlement extends southwards down Swanley Lane and westwards along Springe Lane. Swanley Hall is accessed off Springe Lane and Sparrows Roost lies off the eastern section of Swanley Lane. From the hamlet, Swanley Lane runs northeastwards to meet Monks Lane to the west of Acton village, and southwards via the hamlet of Stoneley Green (Burland parish) to Ravensmoor. Springe Lane runs westwards to the hamlet of Gradeley Green (Burland parish). The A534 (Wrexham Road) runs east–west immediately to the north of Swanley, accessed via Ravens Lane off Swanley Lane.

The Llangollen Canal runs through the settlement, joining the main line of the Shropshire Union Canal at Hurleston Junction. A pond lies between Swanley Lane and the canal towpath. The woodland of Swanley Covert lies to the north west of Swanley, and Long Plantation lies along the eastern section of Swanley Lane.

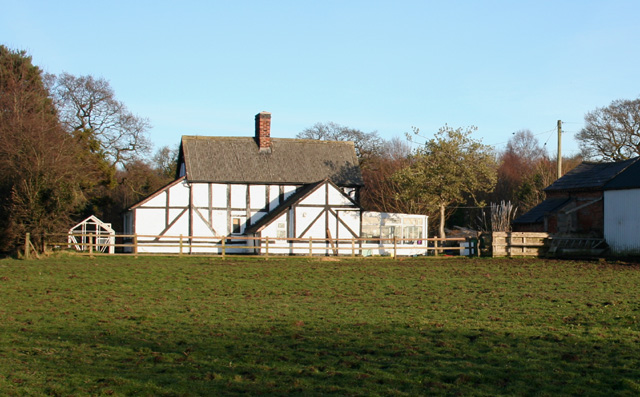
Sparrows Roost

== Landmarks ==
Several buildings in Swanley are listed at grade II, the lowest of the three grades. The earliest is Swanley Hall off Springe Lane, which dates originally from the early 16th century. It is a red-brick farmhouse on an L-shaped plan, with two unequal gables at the south end and some exposed timber framing at the north end. Near Swanley Hall is a dry moated site. Springe Lane Hall, on Springe Lane in Baddiley parish, is an early 17th-century farmhouse in brick with timber framing under a tiled roof. It has a cross-shaped plan, and two of the gables are jettied. Sparrows Roost, off Swanley Lane, is a late 17th-century cottage featuring timber framing with brick infill.

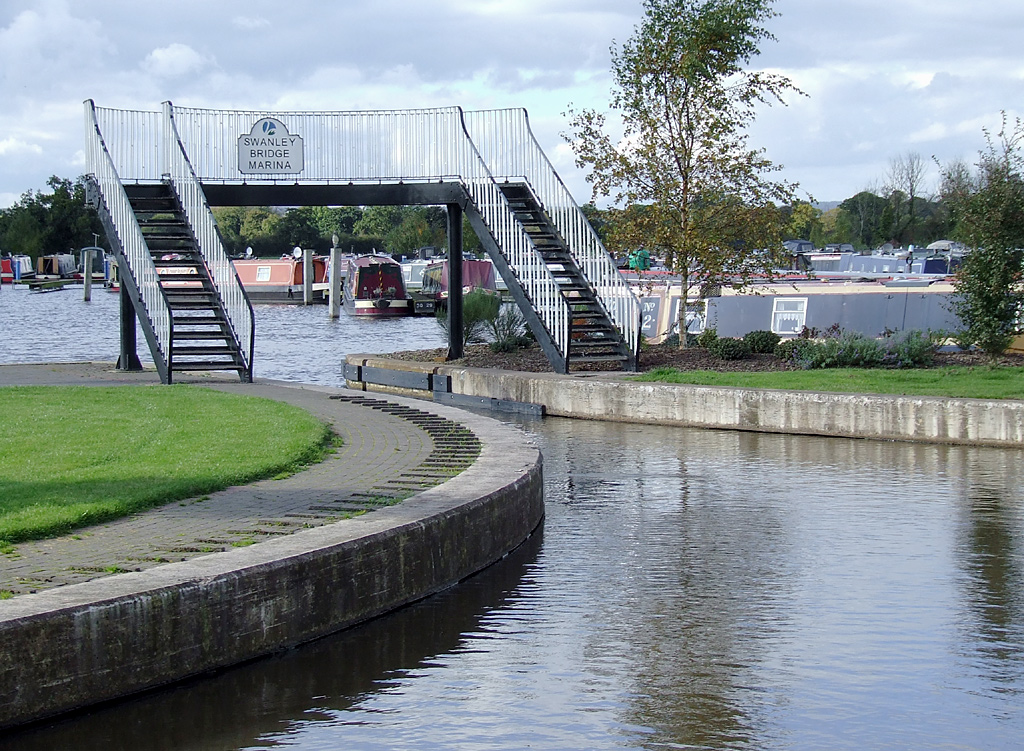
Entrance to Swanley Bridge Marina

A bridge and a lock on the Llangollen Canal are also listed at grade II. Swanley Bridge is a brick road bridge carrying Springe Lane across the canal near the junction with Swanley Lane; it dates from around 1793. Just north of the bridge lies Swanley Lock Number 2, which dates from 1805. The lock is in blue-and-red brick with stone copings, and is by J. Fetcher, with Thomas Telford as the engineer. Swanley Bridge Marina, immediately north of Lock Number 2, opened in 2006; it has 315 berths. South of Swanley are the unlisted Butcher's Bridge, a footbridge, and Swanley Lock Number 1.

== Education ==
Swanley has no educational facilities, falling within the catchment areas of Malbank School and Sixth Form College in Nantwich, and Acton Church of England Primary School.

== See also ==
- Listed buildings in Baddiley
- Listed buildings in Burland
