= Edleston =

Former civil parish in Cheshire, England

Coordinates: 53.053°N 2.542°W

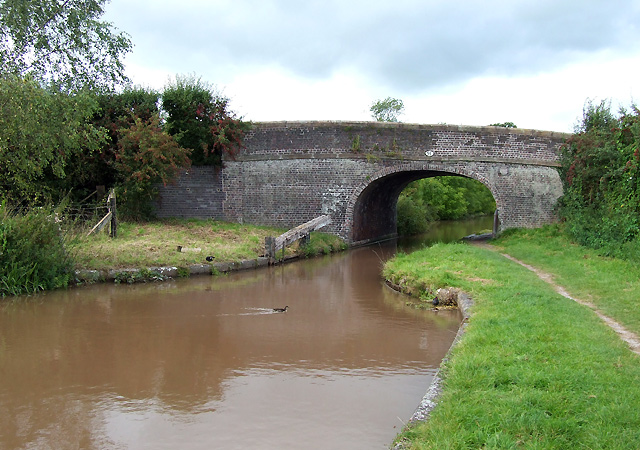
- Marsh Lane Bridge over the Shropshire Union Canal

- Location within Cheshire
- Population: 53 (2001)
- OS grid reference: SJ636507
- Civil parish: Burland and Acton; Nantwich
- Unitary authority: Cheshire East
- Ceremonial county: Cheshire
- Region: North West
- Country: England
- Sovereign state: United Kingdom
- Post town: NANTWICH
- Postcode district: CW5
- Dialling code: 01270
- Police: Cheshire
- Fire: Cheshire
- Ambulance: North West
- UK Parliament: Chester South and Eddisbury

Edleston is a former civil parish, now in the parishes of Burland and Acton and Nantwich, in the unitary authority area of Cheshire East and the ceremonial county of Cheshire, England, which lies immediately to the south west of Nantwich. For administrative purposes, it was combined with adjacent civil parishes of Acton and Henhull to form a total area of 765 hectares (1890 acres). The parish was predominantly rural with scattered farms and houses, with the exception of a new housing estate at the eastern end of the parish east of the canal. Nearby villages include Acton and Ravensmoor.

According to the 2001 census, the parish had a population of 53. Since then new building in the parish has increased the population, with over 300 new houses in the east of the parish bringing the population to well over 500. Malbank Waters is a two-phase development of nearly 400 houses in the east of Edleston as an extension to the town of Nantwich. The first phase was completed in January 2019.

== History ==
The Nantwich and Market Drayton Railway, constructed in 1863, ran southwards towards Audlem at the east of the parish; it is now dismantled.

The parish of Edleston formerly had population figures of 88 (1801), 99 (1851), 74 (1901) and 58 (1951).

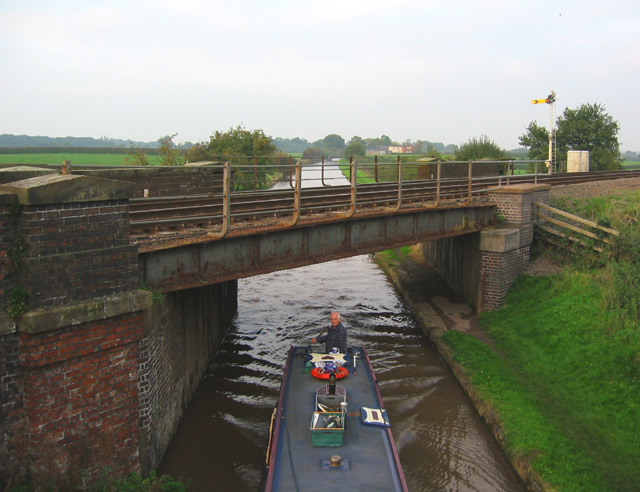
Edleston Railway Bridge on the Shropshire Union

Edleston was formerly a township in the parish of Acton, from 1866 Edleston was a civil parish in its own right, on 1 April 2023 the parish was abolished to form "Burland and Acton", part also went to Nantwich.

== Geography and transport ==
The Shropshire Union Canal runs north–south through the parish and the River Weaver runs along its eastern boundary. Edleston Brook runs east–west across the parish. The Welsh Marches Railway runs from the north east to the south west, crossing the canal immediately adjacent to Edleston Bridge.

Marsh Lane runs along the northern boundary of the parish; it crosses the Shropshire Union Canal at the grade-II-listed Marsh Lane Bridge, which dates from 1826 and was designed by Thomas Telford. The A530 lies immediately to the south. The Crewe and Nantwich Circular Walk runs through the parish.

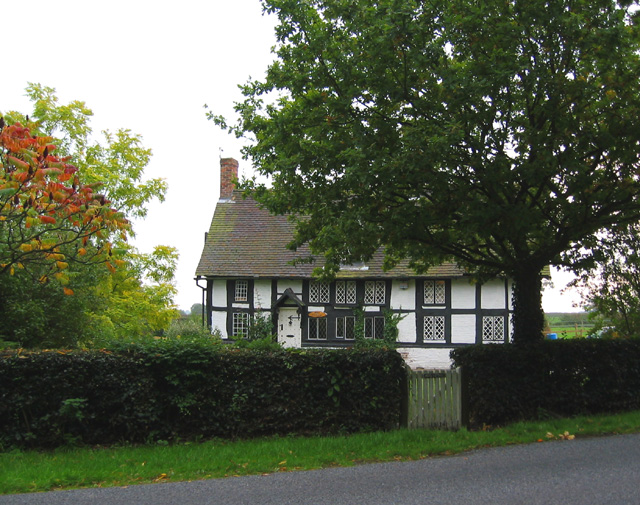
Moss Cottage, Marsh Lane

== Notable features ==
A ring-shaped mound, the remains of a moated site and fishpond, is located to the west of the Shropshire Union Canal by Edleston Bridge at SJ63795076; it is a Scheduled Ancient Monument. Broomfield Cottage, Newbury Cottage, Edleston Farm House and Moss Cottage are grade-II-listed buildings on Marsh Lane.

== See also ==
- Listed buildings in Edleston
