= Ravensmoor Windmill =

Windmill in Cheshire, England

Coordinates: 53.07364°N 2.56398°W

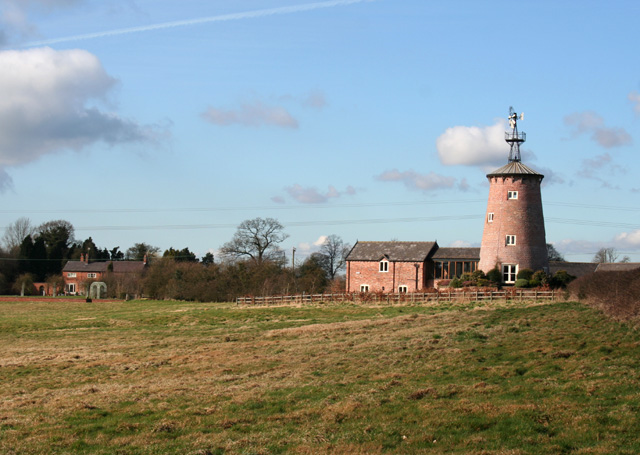
Burland Windmill

Burland Windmill is a former windmill located to the south of Wrexham Road (A534) between the villages of Acton and Burland, Cheshire, England. It is recorded in the National Heritage List for England as a designated Grade II listed building. The structure dates from the early 19th century, and is constructed in red brick. It consists of a circular tapering tower with a boarded roof. The original roof and sails are no longer present, and water pumping mechanism has been installed on the roof. There are windows on three levels, some of which are blocked.

== See also ==
- Listed buildings in Burland
