= Exestan =

Former hundred of Cheshire

Exestan was one of the original twelve Hundreds of Cheshire bordering Wales to the west. It appears in the Domesday Book in 1066 under the control of various Lordships including Thorth of Wroxeter. There were 9 settlements within the Hundred, several of the largest and most valuable (to the Lord) included:

- Gresford - 24 households, £14.5, woodland (4 x 2 leagues), ploughland (12 leagues), 1 mill, 1 church.
- Eyton - 9.5 households, £2.
- Sutton - 8.5 households, £1.
- Hoseley - 1 household, £0.5.

Exestan later became a principal part of the County of Flintshire during the reign of Edward I, and now forms part of Wrexham County Borough.
