= Burland =

Village in Cheshire, England

Coordinates: 53.083°N 2.583°W

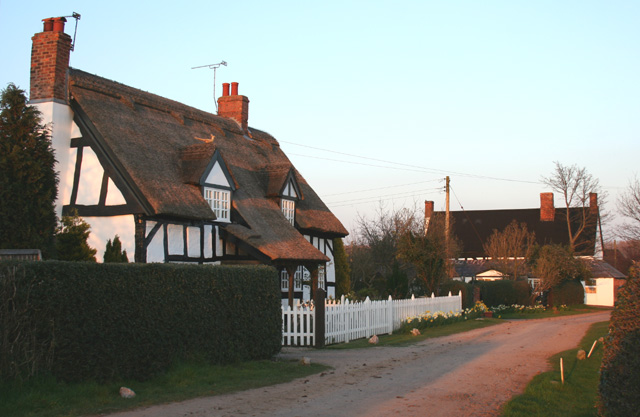
- Rose and End Cottages in Stoneley Green

- Location within Cheshire
- Population: 580 (2011)
- OS grid reference: SJ609542
- Civil parish: Burland and Acton
- Unitary authority: Cheshire East
- Ceremonial county: Cheshire
- Region: North West
- Country: England
- Sovereign state: United Kingdom
- Post town: NANTWICH
- Postcode district: CW5
- Dialling code: 01270
- Police: Cheshire
- Fire: Cheshire
- Ambulance: North West
- UK Parliament: Chester South and Eddisbury

Burland is a village and former civil parish, now in the parish of Burland and Acton, in the unitary authority area of Cheshire East and the ceremonial county of Cheshire, England, about 2 1/2 miles west of Nantwich. The civil parish also included the small settlements of Burland Lower Green, Burland Upper Green, Hollin Green and Stoneley Green, as well as parts of Gradeley Green and Swanley. The eastern part of the village of Ravensmoor also falls within the civil parish (also in the parish of Baddiley).

According to the 2001 census the civil parish had a total population of 582, decreasing slightly to 580 at the 2011 Census.

== History ==
The civil parish formerly had populations of 371 (1801), 627 (1851), 581 (1901) and 546 (1951).

== Governance ==
Burland was administered by Burland Parish Council. The council consists of nine councillors, who meet monthly. In 2011 the Parish Council launched their own website. From 1974 the civil parish was served by Crewe and Nantwich Borough Council, which was succeeded on 1 April 2009 by the unitary authority of Cheshire East.

Burland falls in the parliamentary constituency of Chester South and Eddisbury, which has been represented since the 2024 general election by Aphra Brandreth of the Conservative Party. It was previously part of the Eddisbury constituency, which since its establishment in 1983 had been held by the Conservative MPs Alastair Goodlad (1983–99), Stephen O'Brien (1999–2015), Antoinette Sandbach (2015–19) and Edward Timpson (2019–24).

Burland was formerly a township in the parish of Acton, from 1866 Burland was a civil parish in its own right, on 1 April 2023 the parish was abolished to form "Burland and Acton".

== Geography and transport ==
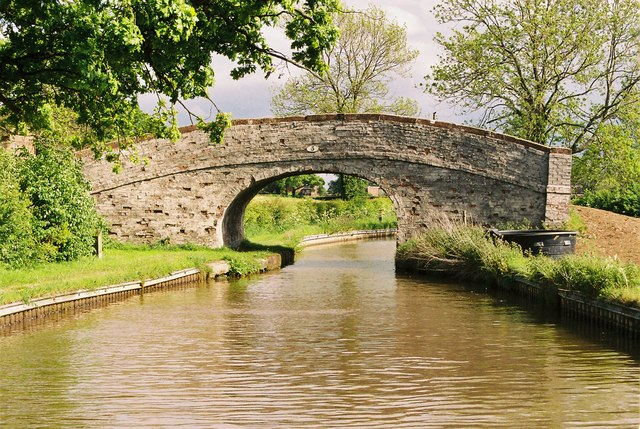
Platt's Bridge on the Shropshire Union Canal

The A534 (Wrexham Road) between Nantwich and Wrexham crosses the civil parish east–west.

The Llangollen branch of the Shropshire Union Canal, just south of Hurleston Junction, runs north–south through the civil parish, immediately to the east of Burland village. The canal is crossed by Wrexham Bridge (carrying the A534) and the grade-II-listed Swanley Bridge, which dates from around 1793, as well as three footbridges: Bethills Bridge, Stoneley Green Bridge and Platt's Bridge. North of Swanley Bridge lies Swanley Lock No. 2; the grade-II-listed lock dates from 1805 and is in blue-and-red brick with stone copings.

Several small conifer plantations fall within the civil parish, including Admiral's Plantation and Tally-ho Covert to the north of Ravensmoor, and Long Plantation near Swanley.

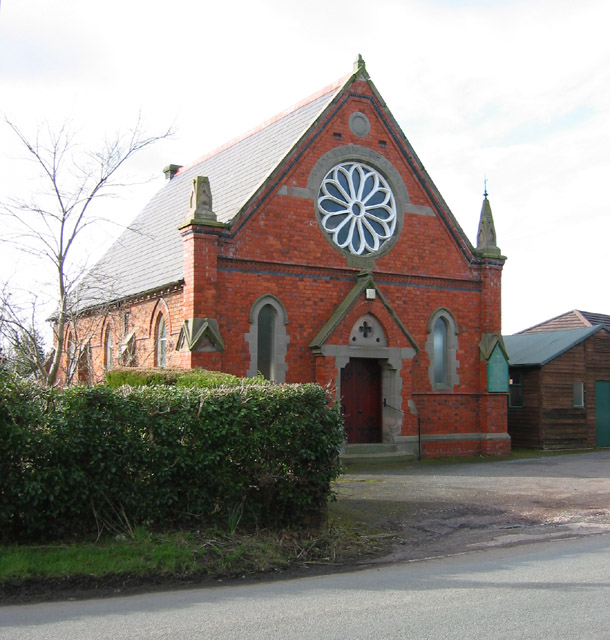
Baddiley & Ravensmoor Church

== Places of worship ==
The Baddiley and Ravensmoor Methodist Church, formerly a Wesleyan Chapel, stands on Swanley Lane in Ravensmoor (at SJ 620 507). Dated 1878, the building is in orange brick with stone dressing and has a prominent circular window and pillars capped with decorative stonework. In the Church of England the area is in the parish of Acton (St Mary), see Acton, Cheshire.

A Primitive Methodist Chapel dating from 1833 was in the civil parish; it closed in 1965.

== Other notable buildings ==
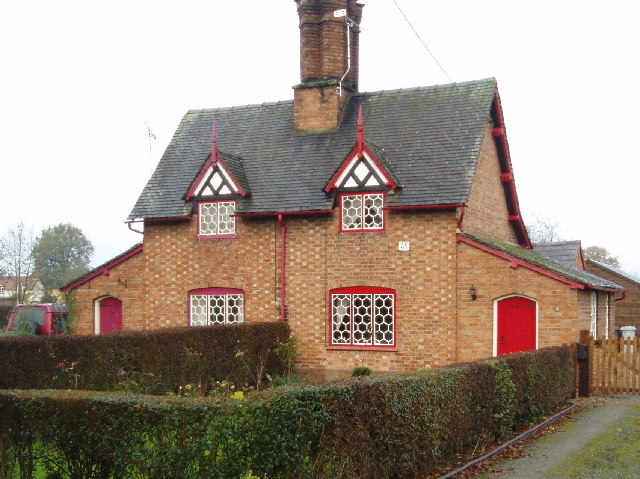
Former estate cottage in Burland village

Swanley Hall in Burland is an L-shaped red-brick farmhouse originally dating from the early 16th century. Green Farm House in Burland Upper Green is a red-brick farmhouse dating from the 17th century.

The civil parish also contains several grade-II-listed black-and-white cottages dating from the 17th century, some of which retain thatched roofs. These include Hollybank Cottage in Barracks Lane, Pear Tree Farmhouse and Rose & End Cottages in Stoneley Green, and Sparrows Roost in Swanley Lane.

Wrexham Road in Burland village is lined by several grade-II-listed buildings dating from around 1870, formerly cottages of the Peckforton Estates. The red-brick cottages feature hexagonal latticed windows, ornate timber gabling and a prominent central chimney stack. Burland Farm House, also built for the Peckforton Estate, is of a similar date.

Ravensmoor Windmill, a former windmill dating from the early 19th century, has been restored as a residential property.

Burland also has its own shop called Burland Stores.

== See also ==
- Listed buildings in Burland
