= Edward Burghall =

Edward Burghall (died 8 December 1665) was an English ejected minister, a Puritan who supported the Parliamentary cause in the English Civil War. He is known for a diary called "Providence improved", which describes the state of Cheshire throughout the English Civil War. From this diary the main facts of Burghall's life can also be gathered.

== Biography ==
Before the civil war Burghall was schoolmaster at Bunbury, Cheshire, and was probably appointed to the post about 1632. (Note: As early as 1556 the name of Burghall is connected with Bunbury, a William Burghall being on the list of pensioners of the chantry of Bunbury dissolved in 1546 (Goodwin 1886, p. 332 cites Ormerod Cheshire, ii. 140).) The parish school at Bunbury, of which Burghall was master, was founded in 1594, and was endowed with "£20 per annum, one house and some land". The vicar of Bunbury till the year 1629 was William Hinde, a celebrated puritan and biographer of John Bruen of Stapleford. (Note: Barlow, who has inserted Burghall's Diary in his Cheshire, states that Burghall was the author of Bruen's life. But there is no mention of Burghall either on the title-page of Bruen's life or in the work itself. It was undoubtedly written by William Hinde, and edited after his death by his son Stephen Hinde, as indeed Barlow in a subsequent note points out.)

In 1643, during the siege of Nantwich, Burghall says that his goods were seized and himself driven from his home by Colonel Marrow; he thereupon went to Haslington in Cheshire, "where he had a call", and tarried there from 1 May 1644 until 1646. In the latter year he became vicar of Acton, taking the place of Hunt, who was sequestered.

In company with fifty-eight Cheshire ministers he signed the attestation to the Solemn League and Covenant in 1648. In this document his name is spelt Burghah, and by Calamy Burgal. In 1658 he preached and published a sermon at the dedication of the free school at Acton. From the year 1655 he complains that he was much molested by the Quakers, and speaks of their opinions with great asperity.

After the Restoration, when the Act of Uniformity 1662 was passed, Burghall was one of the victims of the Great Ejection. After preaching farewell sermons at his churches of Wrenbury and Acton, he was on 3 October 1662 suspended from the vicarage of Acton, and on the 28 October his successor Kirks was appointed.

The diary ends in the year 1663, when expelled from the vicarage he was reduced to poverty; the last note in the diary complains that he was defrauded of his right to the tithes. A school was formed by public subscription for his maintenance. Burghall died 8 December 1665, steadfast in his religious faith.

== Diary ==
His diary was left in manuscript. It was printed in 1778 in an anonymous History of Cheshire, in two vols., which incorporated King's Vale Royal with this and similar narratives. It is more accessible in Barlow’s Cheshire (1855). Its title is Providence improved and it begins with the year 1628. Before the civil war the entries only record what the author regarded as the special interventions of Providence in the neighbourhood of Bunbury. In the year 1641 Burghall first notices political events, and afterwards gives a very detailed account of the military operations in Cheshire. The reason was that Lord Byron took his church at Acton and made it a basis of operations for the siege of Nantwich. The narrative throws additional light on some disputed points in the history of the war. Barlow in one of his notes to the diary (many of these notes, he says, were furnished by Mr. Aspland) states that Burghall married a sister of John Bruen, but he does not give any authority for the statement; and all the marriages of Bruen's sisters are shown in George Ormerod's pedigree of the Bruen family.
