= Ancient parishes of Cheshire =

The ancient parishes of Cheshire were the group of parishes that existed in the English county of Cheshire, roughly within the period of 1200–1800. Initially, the ancient parishes had only an ecclesiastical function, but reforms initiated by King Henry VIII, developed by Queen Elizabeth I and expanded by later legislation led them to acquire various secular functions that eventually led to a split between the ecclesiastical parishes and the purely civil parishes that exist today.

== Ancient parish overall details ==
The data are in the form of two tables: the first one gives information about each ancient parish whilst the second one gives information about each chapelry that may exist within each ancient parish. This complexity is brought about by having ancient parishes which, after the dissolution of the monasteries in the sixteenth century, possessed in some form or another both an ecclesiastical role and a civil role. This dual role existed until the nineteenth century.

=== Ancient parishes ===
Ancient Parish	Earliest Reference / Creation Date	Constituent Chapelries	Constituent Townships	Additional Comments	References
Acton		(none)	Acton, Aston iuxta Mondrem, Austerson, Baddington, Brindley, Burland, Cholmondeston, Edleston, Faddiley, Henhull, Hurleston, Poole, Stoke, Worleston; most of Coole Pilate, small parts of Newhall, Baddiley, and Dodcott cum Wilkesley, and part of Sound.	At one time included the chapelries of Church Minshull, Nantwich, and Wrenbury, and possibly contained the parish of Baddiley.	
Alderley	1328	(none)	Nether Alderley, Over Alderley, Great Warford.	Was once a chapelry of Prestbury.	
Aldford		(none)	Aldford, Buerton, Churton by Aldford, Edgerley.		
Ashton upon Mersey	1350	(none)	Sale; part of Ashton upon Mersey.	The two parishes of Ashton upon Mersey and Bowdon were split up into numerous small portions which were inter-mingled in a complex manner and can only be distinguished completely by viewing the relevant tithe maps for the area.	
Astbury		Congleton	Buglawton, Congleton, Davenport, Eaton, Hulme Walfield, Moreton cum Alcumlow, Newbold Astbury, Odd Rode, Radnor, Smallwood, Somerford, Somerford Booths.	At one time included the parishes of Brereton, Church Lawton, and Swettenham.	
Audlem		(none)	Audlem, Buerton, Hankelow, Tittenley. Parts of Coole Pilate, Dodcott cum Wilkesley, and Newhall.	Was probably once part of Wybunbury parish.	
Backford		(none)	Caughall, Chorlton by Backford, Great Mollington, Lea. Almost all of Backford.	Used to contain Moston that later became part of Chester Saint Mary on the hill parish.	
Baddiley		(none)	Baddiley	Was probably once part of Acton parish, but could also have been part of Wybunbury parish.	
Barrow		(none)	Barrow (Great Barrow and Little Barrow hamlets).	Is claimed to have once been part of Tarvin parish.	
Barthomley		Alsager, Haslington	Alsager, Balterley (in Staffordshire), Barthomley, Crewe, Haslington.	The parish extended into Staffordshire. Claimed to once contain a small part of Hassall township.	
Bebington	1291	(none)	Higher Bebington, Lower Bebington, Poulton cum Spital, Storeton, Tranmere.		
Bidston		Birkenhead	Bidston cum Ford, Moreton cum Lingham, Saughall Massie. Part of Birkenhead, most of Claughton cum Grange.		
Bowdon		Altrincham, Carrington (consecrated 1759).	Altrincham, Ashley, Bowdon, Dunham Massey, Hale, Timperley. Parts of Agden, Ashton upon Mersey, Baguley, Bollington. Partington (in Carrington Chapelry).	The two parishes of Bowdon and Ashton upon Mersey were split up into numerous small portions which were inter-mingled in a complex manner and can only be distinguished completely by viewing the relevant tithe maps for the area. Bowdon also once included the parish of Ashton upon Mersey.	
Brereton		(none)	Brereton cum Smethwick	Originally part of Astbury parish and made a parish around the time of Henry VIII.	
Bromsborough		(none)	Brimstage, Bromborough.	Originally included Eastham parish.	
Bunbury		Burwardsley (created 1735)	Alpraham, Beeston, Bunbury, Burwardsley, Calveley, Haughton, Peckforton, Ridley, Spurstow, Tilstone Fearnall, Tiverton, Wardle.	Used to contain Tarporley township.	
Burton		(none)	Burton, Puddington.		
Cheadle		(none)	Cheadle Bulkeley, Cheadle Moseley. The Bosden component of Handford cum Bosden township.	The two townships of Cheadle Bulkeley and Cheadle Moseley were split up into numerous small portions which were inter-mingled in a complex manner and can only be distinguished completely by viewing the relevant tithe maps for the area.	
Chester Holy Trinity		(none)	Holy Trinity, The Blacon part of Blacon cum Crabwell.		
Chester Saint Bridget		(none)	(none)		
Chester Saint John		(none)	(none)	Although no townships were dependent upon this parish, it did contain 16 fields that were part of Hoole.	
Chester Saint Martin		(none)	(none)		
Chester Saint Mary on the hill		(none)	Claverton, Little Mollington, Marlston cum Lache, Moston, Saint Mary (Chester) including Gloverstone. The greater part of Upton.		
Chester Saint Michael		(none)	(none)		
Chester Saint Olave		(none)	(none)		
Chester Saint Oswald		(none)	Bache, Croughton, Great Boughton, Iddinshall, Newton by Chester, Saint Oswald (Chester), Wervin. The Crabwall part of Blacon cum Crabwall, part of Upton, and the islands of Hilbre and Little Eye in the Dee Estuary were in this parish.	Iddinshall was the detached part of this parish, as were Hilbre island and Little Eye, which may once have been part of the ancient parish of West Kirby.	
Chester Saint Peter		(none)	(none)		
Christleton		(none)	Christleton, Cotton Abbotts, Cotton Edmunds, Littleton, Rowton.		
Church Lawton		(none)	Church Lawton	Originally part of Astbury ancient Parish	
Church Minshull		(none)	Church Minshull	Originally a chapelry of Acton ancient parish.	
Coddington		(none)	Aldersey, Chowley, Coddington.		
Coppenhall	1373	(none)	Church Coppenhall, Monks Coppenhall	Originally a chapelry of Acton parish.	
Davenham		(none)	Bostock, Davenham, Eaton, Leftwich, Moulton, Newhall, Shipbrook, Shurlach cum Bradford, Stanthorne, Wharton, Whatcroft.	Although extra-parochial, Rudheath Lordship was associated with this parish.	
Delamere	1812	(none)	Delamere, Eddisbury, Kingswood, Oakmere.	Originally an extra-parochial place which was part of Delamere Forest, the parish was formed by unifying the forest part with Eddisbury, Kingswood, and Oakmere townships.	
Dodleston		(none)	Dodleston, Higher Kinnerton (Flintshire), Lower Kinnerton.	The parish extended into Flintshire, in Wales.	
Eastham	1152	(none)	Childer Thornton, Eastham, Great Sutton, Hooton, Little Sutton, Netherpool, Overpool, the greater part of Whitby.	Originally, this was a chapelry of Bromborough ancient parish.	
Eccleston		(none)	Eaton, Eccleston		
Farndon	before 1301	(none)	Barton, Churton by Farndon, Clutton, Crewe (by Farndon), Farndon.	Up to the 14th century, Farndon also included the chapelry of Holt in Denbighshire, Wales.	
Frodsham		Alvanley	Alvanley, Frodsham, Frodsham Lordship, Helsby, Kingsley, Manley, Newton by Frodsham, most of Norley.	Frodsham and Frodsham Lordship are so inter-mingled that one needs to refer to the tithe maps in order to distinguish between them. Within Frodsham, the hamlets of Bradley, Netherton, Overton, and Woodhouses approached township status in their own right.	
Gawsworth	1382	(none)	Gawsworth	Originally was a chapelry in Prestbury ancient parish.	
Grappenhall		Latchford	Grappenhall, Latchford.		
Great Budworth	1269	Little Leigh, Lower Whitley, Lower Peover, Witton.	Allostock. Anderton, Antrobus, Appleton, Aston by Budworth, Barnton, Bartington, Castle Northwich, Cogshall, Comberbach, Crowley, Great Budworth, Hartford, Higher Whitley, Hulse, Lach Dennis, Little Leigh, Lostock Gralam, Lower Whitley, Marbury, Nether Peover, Nirches, Northwich, Peover Inferior, Pickmere, Plumley, Seven Oaks, Stretton, Tabley Inferior, Wincham, Winnington, Witton cum Twambrook. Most of Dutton was in this parish, as well as a detached portion of Marrston township. Witton chapelry also contained a small part of the Rudheath Lordship.		
Guilden Sutton		(none)	Guilden Sutton		
Handley		(none)	Golborne David, Handley		
Harthill		(none)	Harthill	Sometimes said to be a "free chapelry", and probably used to be part of Malpas ancient parish.	
Heswall		(none)	Gayton, Heswall cum Oldfield.		
Ince		(none)	Ince	The north-west tip of Ince was in Stoke ancient parish.	
Knutsford	1741	(none)	Bexton, Nether Knutsford, Ollerton, Over Knutsford, Toft.	This was originally a chapelry of Rostherne ancient parish.	
Lymm		(none)	Lymm		
Malpas		Whitewell (Flintshire, Wales)	Agden, Bickerton, Bickley, Broxton, Bulkeley, Chidlow, Cholmondeley, Chorlton, Cuddington, Duckington, Edge, Egerton, Hampton, Iscoyd, Larton, Macefen, Malpas, Newton by Malpas, Oldcastle, Overton, Stockton, Tushingham cum Grindley, Wigland, Wychough. A detached part of Bradley was part of this parish.	Iscoyd was part of the Whitewell Chapelry, Flintshire, Wales. Cholmondeley is said to have the status of "chapel of ease". Harthill was probably at one time part of this parish.	
Middlewich		(none)	Byley cum Yatehouse, Clive, Croxton, Kinderton cum Hulme, Middlewich, Minshull Vernon, Noresbarrow cum Parme, Newton, Occlestone, Ravenscroft, Sproston, Stublach (detached), Sutton, Weaver, Wimboldsley.		
Mobberley		(none)	Mobberley		
Mottram in Longdendale		(none)	Godley, Hattersley, Hollingworth, Matley, Mottram in Longdendale, Newton, Stayley, Tintwistle	Tintwistle contained Woodhead Chapel as well as the hamlets of Micklehurst and Arnfield.	
Nantwich	1677	(none)	Alvaston, Leighton, Nantwich, Woolstanwood. Part of Willaston.	Originally was a chapelry of Acton ancient parish.	
Neston		(none)	Great Neston, Ledsham, Leighton, Little Neston cum Hargrave, Ness, Raby, Thornton Hough, Willaston.		
Northenden		(none)	Northenden, Northen Etchells. A very small part (30 fields) of Baguley township was also part of this parish.		
Over		Wettenhall	Oulton Lowe, Wettenhall. A small part of Marton township. Part of Over township.	Little Budworth used to be a chapelry of this parish. Vale Royal abbey complicates matters for this parish, as most of its lands were in Over parish (with some also in Weaverham ancient parish) Upon dissolution, its church was made a separate parish of Whitegate which included another township originally in Over: Darnhall, and also a large part of Marton township.	
Overchurch		(none)	Upton.		
Plemstall		(none)	Bridge Trafford, Mickle Trafford, Picton, Also all of Hoole (remainder was in Chester Saint John ancient parish.)		
Prestbury	before 1312	Bosley, Capesthorne, Macclesfield, Macclesfield Forest, Marton, Pott Shrigley, Poynton, Rainow, Siddington, Wincle	Adlington, Birtles, Bollington, Bosley, Butley, Capesthorne, Fallibroome, Henbury cum Pexall, Hurdsfield, Kettleshulme, Lower Withington, Lyme Handley, Macclesfield, Macclesfield Forest, Marton, Mottram Saint Andrew, Newton, North Rode, Pott Shrigley, Poynton, Prestbury, Rainow, Siddington, Sutton Downes, Tytherington, Upton, Wildboarclough, Wincle, Woodford, Worth	Originally included the parishes of Alderley, and Taxal. Also originally included the chapelry of Chelford (made a parish in 1674), and Gawsworth (made a parish in 1382, and containing Mutlow, which is said to be the possible meeting place of the old Domesday Hundred of Hamestan.). Woodford is sometimes said to have been part of Poynton chapelry. Newton township was said to have a chapel of ease in a map of 1740, though it was noted to be entirely ruined.	
Pulford		(none)	Poulton, Pulford		
Rostherne		Over Peover	High Legh, Marthall cum Warford, Peover Superior, Snelson, Mere, Millington, Rostherne, Tabley Superior, Tatton. Part of Agden and Bollington townships.	Once contained Knutsford chapelry, but this was made a full parish in 1741. High Legh and Tabley Superior were marked as being "chapels of eased" on a 1740 map.	
Runcorn	1086	Aston, Daresbury, Halton, Poolsey, Thelwall	Acton Grange, Aston by Sutton, Aston Grange, Clifton, Daresbury, Halton, Hatton, Keckwick, Moore, Newton by Daresbury, Norton, Preston on the hill, Runcorn, Stockham, Sutton iuxta Frodsham, Thelwall, Walton Inferior, Walton Superior, Weston. Part of Dutton.	Dutton township was in this parish and the parish of Great Budworth. Poolsey chapelry was built in 1236, near Dutton. It was "lost" when people abandoned it for the nearby Dutton chapel, and was last mentioned in 1778. Aston was made a parochial chapelry in 1635. Thelwall chapelry was a detached area associated with Daresbury chapelry.	
Sandbach	1350	Church Hulme, Goostrey	Arclid, Blackden, Betchton, Bradwall, Church Hulme, Cotton, Cranage, Earnshaw, Goostrey cum Barnshaw, Hassall, Leese, Sandbach, Twemlow, Wheelock	Leese was a township that was detached from its chapelry of Goostrey. Earnshaw was a detached part of Rudheath Lordship.	
Shocklach		(none)	Caldecott, Church Shocklach, Shocklach Oviatt		
Shotwick		(none)	Capenhurst, Great Saughall, Little Saughall, Shotwick, Woodbank	The extra-parochial area of Shotwick Park, which is entirely enclosed within this parish and the River Dee estuary, may once have been part of this parish,	
Stockport	1558	Disley, Marple, Chadkirk,	Bramhall, Bredbury, Brinnington, Disley, Dukinfield, Hyde, Marple, Norbury, Offerton, Romiley, Stockport, Stockport Etchells, Torkington, Werneth	Dukinfield was noted as being a Chapel of ease in 1740.	
Stoke	late 13th century	(none)	Little Stanney, Stoke. Parts of the townships of Whitby, Backford, and Ince (that part in Eddisbury Hundred) were also in Stoke parish.	Stanlow and Great Stanney, although extra-parochial areas, seem later on to have had some connection with Stoke parish. Stoke parish may originally have been part of Chester Saint Oswald parish, which had burial rights in Stoke up to the late 13th century.	
Swettenham		(none)	Kermincham, Swettenham.	Probably used to be part of Astbury parish.	
Tarporley	around 1200	(none)	Eaton, Rushton, Tarporley, Utkinton	Tarporley was stated to be a separate parish after Papal authorities rejected a claim that it was a chapelry of Bunbury parish.	
Tarvin		(none)	Ashton, Bruen Stapleford, Burton, Clotton Hoofield, Duddon, Foulk Stapleford, Hockenhull, Horton cum Peel, Kelsall, Mouldsworth, Tarvin.	It is sometimes claimed that Barrow parish may have once been part of this parish. Prior's Hey, an extra-parochial area, was later on sometimes said to be part of Tarvin.	
Tattenhall		(none)	Golborne Bellow, Newton by Tattenhall, Tattenhall		
Taxal	1377	(none)	Taxal, Yeardsley cum Whaley	Taxal parish was created from Taxal chapelry in Prestbury parish in 1377.	
Thornton		(none)	Dunham on the hill, Elton, Hapsford, Thornton le moors, Wimbolds Trafford		
Thurstaston		(none)	Thurstaston. A small part of Greasby township was in this parish, as was a small part of Irby township.		
Tilston		(none)	Carden, Grafton, Horton, Stretton, Tilston	Grafton was an extra-parochial liberty which only became part of Tilston parish in 1841,	
Wallasey		(none)	Liscard, Poulton cum Seacombe, Wallasey		
Warburton		(none)	Warburton	This was said to have originally been an ancient free chapel, associated with Lymm parish.	
Warmingham		(none)	Elton, Moston, Tetton, Warmingham		
Waverton		(none)	Hatton, Huxley, Waverton		
Weaverham		(none)	Acton, Cuddington, Onston, Wallerscote. Most of Crowton and Weaverham cum Milton townships.	A very small part of Crowton township lay in Norley township in Frodsham parish, and vice versa. The location of Vale Royal Abbey complicated the picture for Weaverham cum Milton township, with parts of that township (Hefferson Grange, Weaverham Wood, and small parts of Sandiway) being in Whitegate parish.	
West Kirby		(none)	Caldy, Frankby, Grange, Great Meols, Hoose, Little Meols, Newton cum Larton, West Kirby. Most of Greasby township lay in this parish (with the remaining small part in Thurstaston parish.)		
Whitegate	1541/1542	(none)	Darnhall. The greater part of Marton township parts of Over township; and parts of Weaverham townships lay in this parish.	The presence of Vale Royal Abbey and its dissolution in the sixteenth century complicates matters for this parish. It was created as a result of the abbey's dissolution, when the parish was also known as "New Church"	
Wilmslow		(none)	Bollin Fee, Chorley, Fulshaw, Pownall Fee	Wilmslow was the name of just the church and churchyard which later became applied to the entire area.	
Wistaston	around 1299/1300	(none)	Wistaston	Originally was part of Wybunbury parish	
Woodchurch		(none)	Arrowe, Barnston, Landican, Noctorum, Oxton, Pensby, Prenton, Thingwall, Woodchurch. The greater part of Irby township was in this parish, as was a small part of Claughton cum Grange township.	It is claimed that Woodchurch township might once have originally been part of Landicam, which in turn might have possible origins in a church that predates the Domesday book.	
Wybunbury		(none)	Basford, Batherton, Blakenhall, Bridgemere, Checkley cum Wrinehill, Chorlton, Doddington, Hatherton, Hough, Hunsterson, Lea, Rope, Shavington cum Gresty, Stapeley, Walgherton, Weston, Wybunbury. Part of Willaston township was in this parish.	Most of Wrinehill (in Checkley cum Wrinehill) was in Staffordshire. The parish was originally much larger, and included the parishes of Audlem, Coppenhall, Wistaston, and (possibly) Baddiley.	

=== Chapelry details ===
Chapelry	Earliest Reference / Creation Date	Parent Ancient Parish	Constituent Townships	Additional Comments	References
Alsager		Barthomley	Alsager (in 1852)	The chapel was built in 1789–1790 with money given by Mary, Margaret, and Judith Alsager (from the family from which the name of the town is derived.)	
Altrincham	1799	Bowdon	Altrincham	May be known as "Booth's chapel", which was given as a parochial chapel on a 1740 map, apparently bullt during the reign of Edward IV.	
Alvanley		Frodsham	Alvanley		
Aston	1635	Runcorn	Aston by Sutton, Aston Grange, Sutton iuxta Frodsham.	In 1843, the extra-parochial area of Middleton Grange was transferred to Aston by Sutton township.	
Bosley	1402	Prestbury		The rights of a chapelry seem to have been conferred by a Papal Bull.	
Bruera		Chester Saint Oswald	Churton Heath, Huntington, Lea Newbold, Saighton.		
Burwaldsley	1735	Bunbury			
Capesthorne	1722	Prestbury			
Carrington	1759	Bowdon	Carrington, Partington.		
Chadkirk		Stockport	Romiley		
Chelford	1674	Prestbury	Chelford, Old Withington	The chapel existed from at least 1265/1266, but it is not clear that it was made a chapelry at this time.	
Church Hulme		Sandbach	Church Hulme, Cotton, Cranage.		
Congleton	1687	Astbury		Burial rights were awarded to this chapelry in 1687, though it had no wardens or any (other) parochial duties.	
Daresbury		Runcorn	Acton Grange, Daresbury, Hatton, Keckwick, Moore, Newton by Daresbury, Preston on the hill, Thelwall, Walton Inferior, Walton Superior.	Thelwall was a detached part of this chapelry.	
Disley	1558	Stockport		The chapel was built in 1512 and consecrated in 1558.	
Goostrey	sometime before 1350	Sandbach	Blackden, Goostrey cum Barnshaw, Leese, Twemlow.	Leese was a detached township. Twemlow township contained "No Town" as a detached part of the Rudheath Lordship.	
Halton	1398	Runcorn	Halton	There is some suggestion that the townships of Norton and Stockham had a connection with this chapelry.	
Haslington	1302.	Barthomley	Haslington		
Latchford	1777	Grappenhall	Latchford		
Little Budworth		Over	Little Budworth	This was first of all a "free" chapelry.	
Little Leigh		Great Budworth	Little Leigh		
Lower Peover		Great Budworth	Allostock, Nether Peover, Peover Inferior, Plumley.	The chapel was built around 1269.	
Lower Whitley		Great Budworth	Lower Whitley		
Macclesfield	1278	Prestbury	Hurdsfield, Kettleshulme, Macclesfield, Macclesfield Forest, Pott Shrigley, Rainow, Sutton Downes, Wildboarclough, Wincle.	Macclesfield Forest and Wildboarclough were made a separate chapelry known as Macclesfield Forest chapelry sometime before 1789. Pott Shrigley, Rainow, and Wincle were also later made separate chapelries.	
Macclesfield Forest	Before 1789	Prestbury (Macclesfield)	Macclesfield Forest, Wildboarclough	Macclesfield Forest was originally part of Macclesfield chapelry in Prestbury parish, but was later made a separate chapelry in its own right.	
Marbury		Whitchurch (Shropshire)	Marbury with Quoisley, Norbury.	The two townships became civil parishes entirely within Cheshire in 1866. Marbury with Quoisley later changed its name to Marbury cum Quoisley.	
Marple		Stockport	Marple		
Marton	Before 1549	Prestbury	Almost all of Marton township (apart from Mutlow).	Mutlow was a place in this township but in the parish of Gawsworth. It was the possible meeting place of the Domesday hundred of Hamestan.	
Over Peover		Rostherne	Marthall cum Warford, Peover Superior, Snelson		
Pott Shrigley	1472	Prestbury (Macclesfield)	Pott Shrigley	Downes Chapel was said to be here in 1472. Pott Shrigley was originally part of Macclesfield chapelry in Prestbury parish, but was later made a separate chapelry in its own right.	
Poynton	1312	Prestbury	Poynton, Worth	Ormerod states that Woodford was in this chapelry, but another source denies this.	
Rainow		Prestbury (Macclesfield)	Rainow	Rainow was originally part of Macclesfield chapelry in Prestbury parish, but was later made a separate chapelry in its own right.	
Siddington		Prestbury	Siddington		
Thelwall		Daresbury	Thelwall		
Wettenhall		Over	Wettenhall		
Wincle		Prestbury (Macclesfield)	Wincle	Wincle was originally part of Macclesfield chapelry in Prestbury parish, but was later made a separate chapelry in its own right.	
Witton		Great Budworth	Birches, Castle Northwich, Hartford, Hulse, Lach Dennis, Lostock Gralam, Northwich, Winnington, Witton cum Twambrook.	Also contained a small part of the Rudheath Lordship.	
Wrenbury		Acton	Broomhall, Chorley, Woodcott, and Wrenbury cum Frith. Parts of Dodcott cum Wilkesley, Newhall, and Sound.	Burleydam chapel (associated with this chapelry) was partly in Dodcott cum Wilkesley and partly in Newhall parish.	

== Extra-parochial areas ==
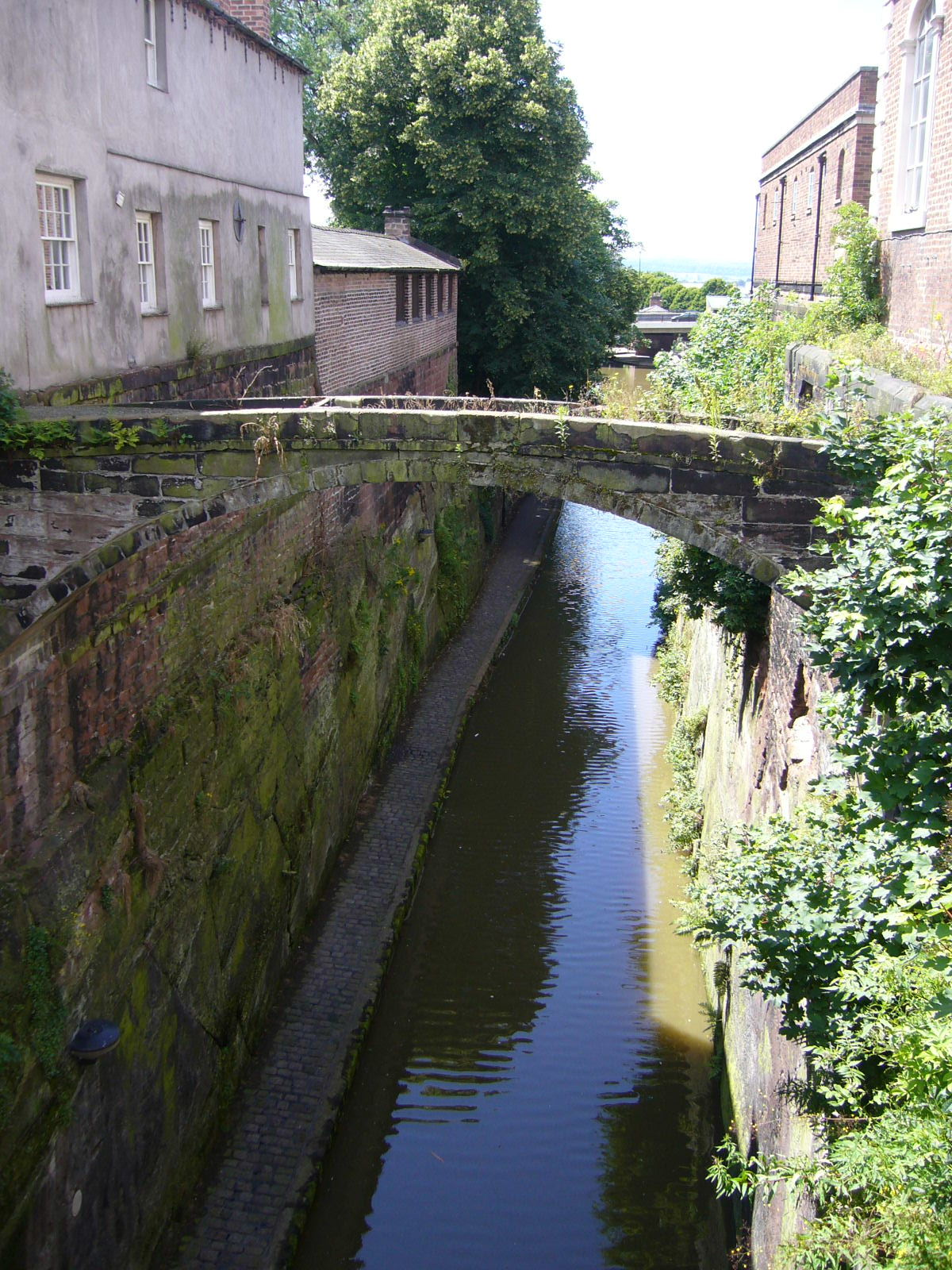
Little Saint John, Chester. In 1793 this bridge was built to link the Northgate Gaol to the chapel of the Bluecoat Hospital

Various areas of Cheshire were not included in any ancient parish. As Dunn states: The reasons are various and occasionally obscure. Dunn later goes on to state that associations with religious houses (priories, abbeys and so on) or with the Crown seem to explain most of them, but this area of research is still ongoing. The following table contains the extra-parochial places or areas of Cheshire with some details about each of them:

Extra-Parochial Area	Grid Ref.	Earliest Reference	Fate	Additional Comments	References
Birkenhead				A liberty which formed the desmesne of Birkenhead Priory.	
Chester Castle			Became a civil parish in 1858.		
Chester Cathedral Precincts			Became a civil parish in 1858.		
Grafton			Became officially part of Tilston township in the parish of the same name in 1841.	An extra-parochial liberty that was informally taken to be part of Tilston township, which it officially became part of in 1841.	
Great Stanney		1178	Became a civil parish in 1858.	Was a possession of Stanlow Abbey.	
King's Marsh (also known as Overmarsh)			Became a civil parish in 1858.	Has a detached portion to the south-east of the main body, bordered by Shocklach and Tilston ancient parishes.	
Little Saint John, Chester (also known as Saint John of Jerusalem's Hospital)				In 1778, this area was stated to contain Bluecoat Hospital, Northgate Gaol, and six almshouses.	
Middleton Grange			Became part of the township of Acton Grange in Runcorn Ancient Parish in 1858.	This was an extra-parochial township which was linked with Aston by Sutton in 1843.	
Prior's Heys			Became a civil parish in 1858.		
Rudheath		1365	The separate portions of this Lordship were absorbed into the newly created parishes that contained them in the period from 1858 to 1866.	Formed the Rudheath Lordship, which was made up of a number of detached parts in Sandbach parish (Earnshaw township), Twemlow township (No Town Farm), and elsewhere.	
Shotwick Park			Became a civil parish in 1858.		
Spital Boughton, Chester			Became a civil parish in 1858.		
Stanlow			Became a civil parish in 1858.		
Threapwood				The area was split between Cheshire and Flintshire, in Wales.	
Willington			Became a civil parish in 1858.		

== Notes and references ==
=== Bibliography ===
- Dodgson, J. McN. (1970a), The place-names of Cheshire. Part one: Country name, regional and forest names, river names, road names, the place-names of Macclesfield hundred, Cambridge: Cambridge University Press, ISBN 0-521-07703-6
- Dodgson, J. McN. (1970b), The place-names of Cheshire. Part two: The place-names of Bucklow Hundred and Northwich Hundred, Cambridge: Cambridge University Press, ISBN 0-521-07914-4
- Dodgson, J. McN. (1971), The place-names of Cheshire. Part three: The place-names of Nantwich Hundred and Eddisbury Hundred, Cambridge: Cambridge University Press, ISBN 0-521-08049-5
- Dodgson, J. McN. (1972), The place-names of Cheshire. Part four: The place-names of Broxton Hundred and Wirral Hundred, Cambridge: Cambridge University Press, ISBN 0-521-08247-1
- Dunn, F. I. (1987), The ancient parishes, townships and chapelries of Cheshire, Chester: Cheshire Record Office and Cheshire Diocesan Record Office, ISBN 0-906758-14-9
- Harris, B. E.; Thacker, A. T. (1987), The Victoria history of the county of Chester. (Volume 1: Physique, Prehistory, Roman, Anglo-Saxon, and Domesday), Oxford: Oxford University Press, ISBN 0-19-722761-9
- Ormerod, G. (1882), History of the county palatine of Chester. (3 Volumes) (Edition edited by Helsby, T ed.)
- Phillips, A. D. M.; Phillips, C. B. (2002), A new historical atlas of Cheshire, Chester, UK: Cheshire County Council and Cheshire Community Council Publications Trust, ISBN 0-904532-46-1
- Sylvester, D.; Nulty, G. (1958), The historical atlas of Cheshire ((Third Edition) ed.), Chester, UK: Cheshire Community Council
- Sylvester, D. (1980), A history of Cheshire. (The Darwen county history series). (2nd Edition.), London and Chichester, Sussex: Phillimore & Co. Ltd., ISBN 0-85033-384-9
- Youngs, F. A. (1991), Guide to the local administrative units of England. (Volume 2: Northern England), London: Royal Historical Society, ISBN 9780901050670
- Winchester, A. (2000), Discovering parish boundaries, Princes Risborough, United Kingdom: Shire Publications, ISBN 0-7478-0470-2
