= Crewe and Nantwich Circular Walk =

Footpath in Cheshire, England

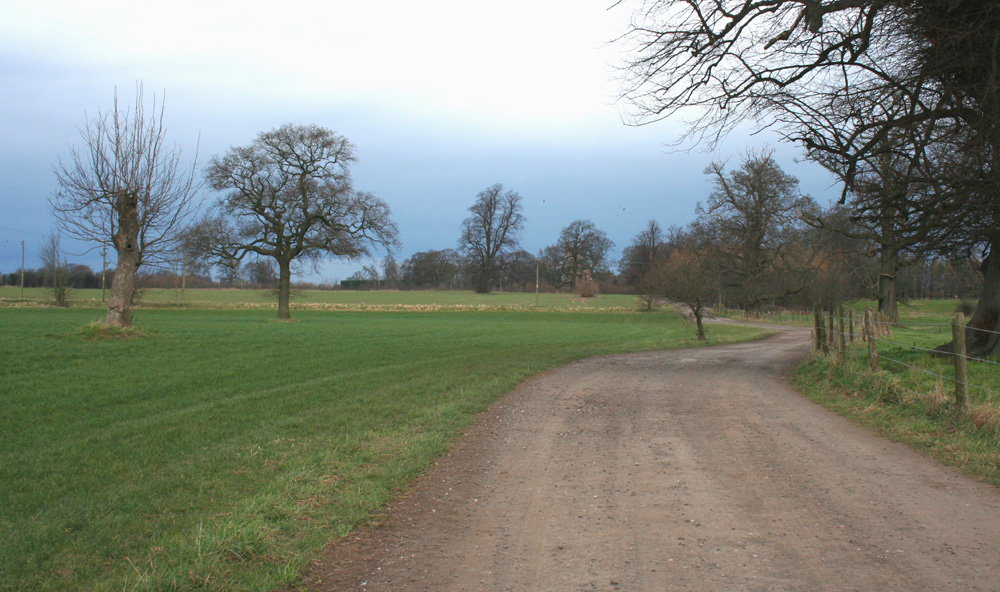
- At the Dorfold Estate
- Length: 47 km (29 mi)
- Location: Cheshire, England
- Use: Hiking
- Season: All year

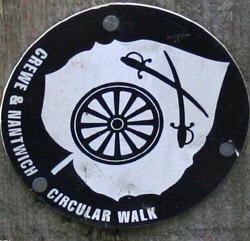
Waymarker

The Crewe and Nantwich Circular Walk is a 29-mile (47 km) long-distance walkers' path in the Cheshire East area of Cheshire, England. As the name suggests, the walk forms a circuit around the towns of Crewe and Nantwich. It is one of two circular walks in the county of Cheshire, the other being the Vale Royal Round.

The walk is waymarked with a circle with symbols of a leaf, cartwheel and crossed swords. Although mainly on level terrain, the many stiles make the walk unsuitable for people with mobility problems.

== Route and sights of interest ==
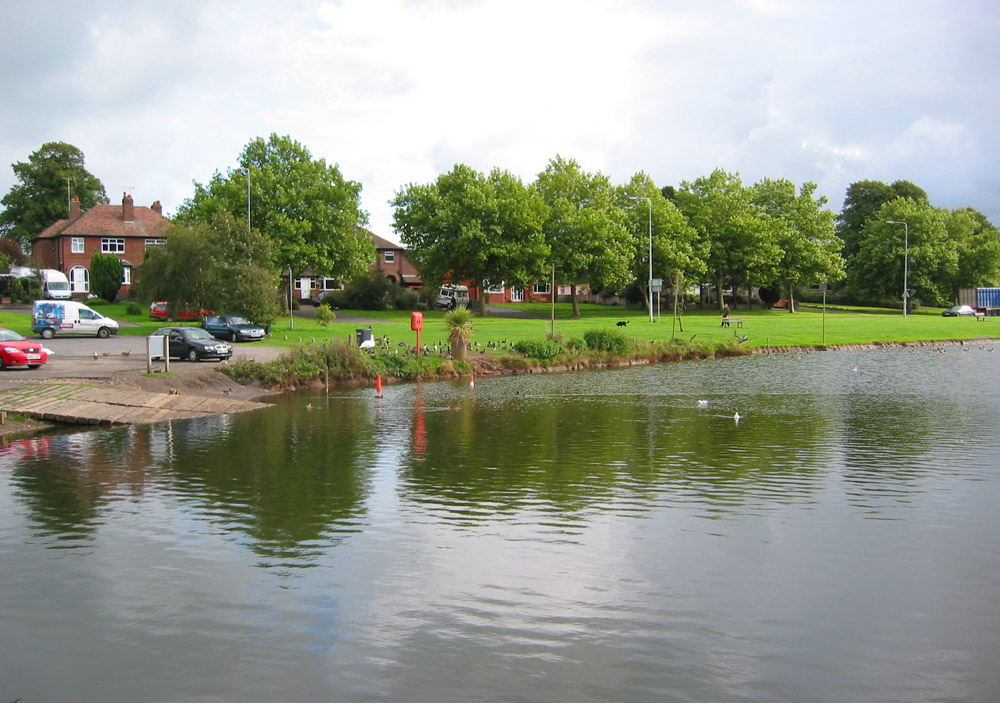
Shrewbridge Lake, Nantwich

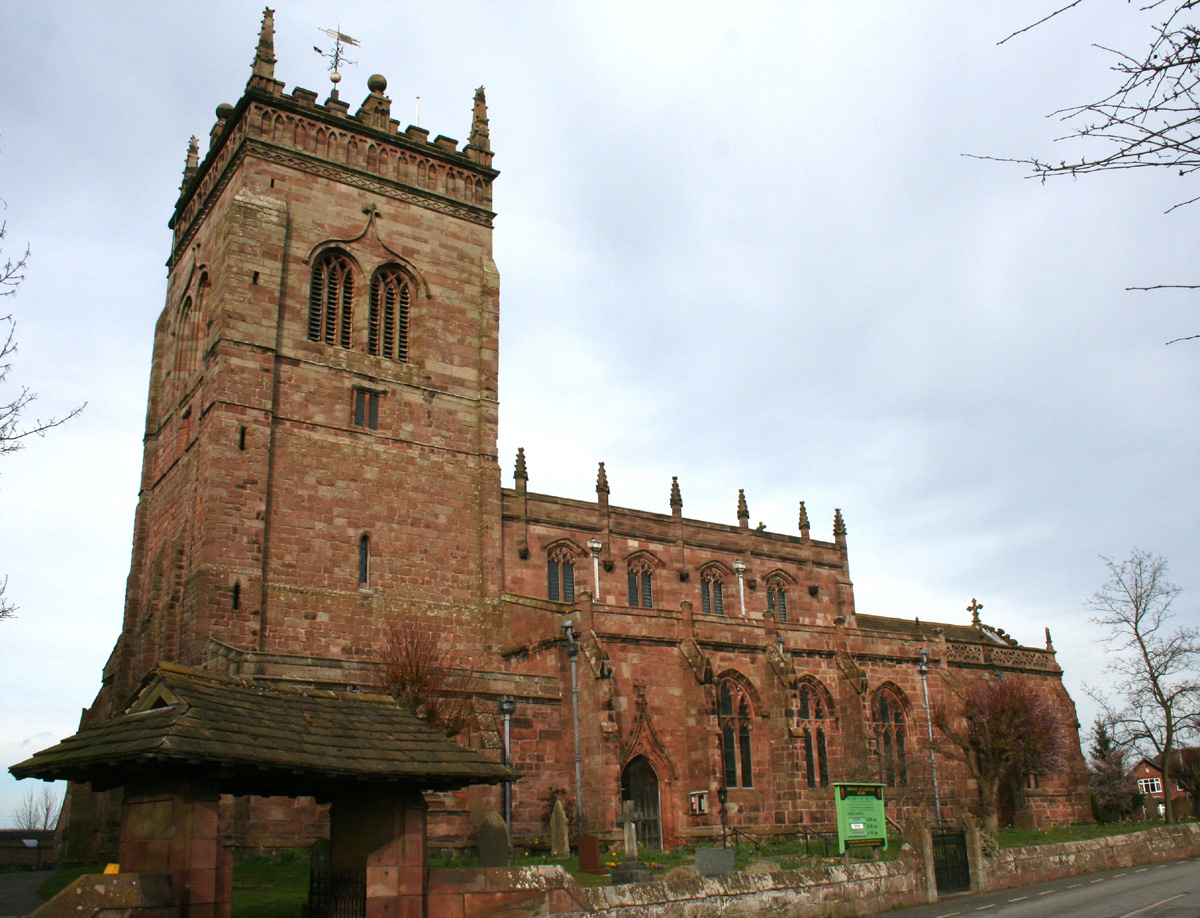
St Mary's Church, Acton

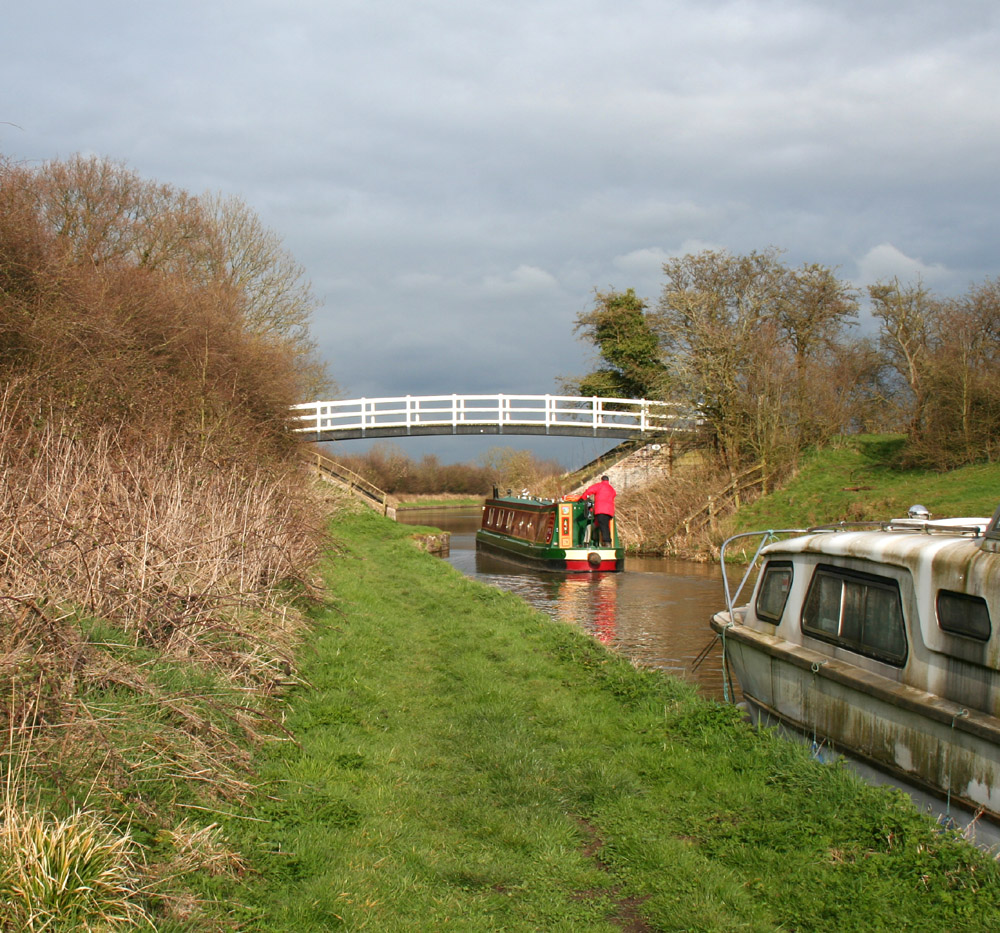
Brickyard Bridge on the Shropshire Union Canal

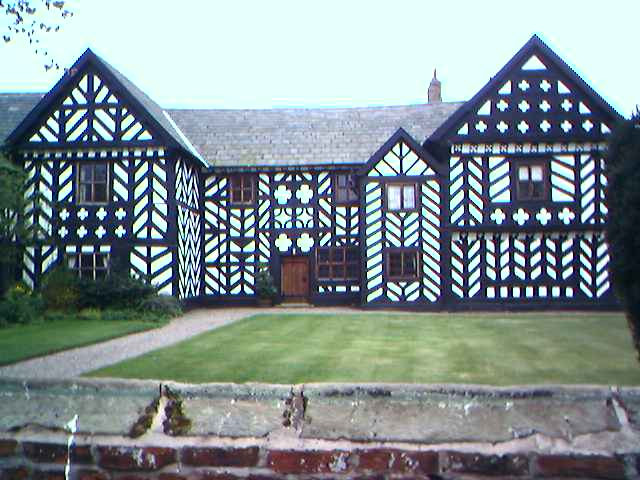
Haslington Hall

The walk is divided into three sections, with sights of interest as follows:

=== Weston to Acton ===
10 miles (16 km)

- Weston
- Hough Common
- Wybunbury
- Mill Bank Farm, with site of medieval watermill
- Old Hall Austerson, with 16th-century barn
- Shrewbridge Lake, saltwater lake on the outskirts of Nantwich
- Dorfold Hall, Jacobean manor house
- St Mary's Church, Acton, with tower dating from the 13th century. The churchyard has a 17th-century sundial and almhouses dating from 1613.
- Acton village has several buildings dating from the 17th and 18th centuries

=== Acton to Coppenhall ===
10.5 miles (17 km)

- Henhull, site of Roman road
- Reaseheath College
- Middlewich branch of the Shropshire Union Canal, with Brickyard Bridge, named after an adjacent brickworks
- Moat House Farm, with remains of unusual old moat structure

=== Coppenhall to Weston ===
8.5 miles (14 km)

- Coppenhall Moss, site of former peat bog, now drained
- Sandbach Flashes, series of salt water pools, good for bird-watching
- Winterley, former millpond, now home to mute swans
- Haslington Hall, Tudor house
- Valley Brook, surrounded by old woodland

== See also ==
- List of recreational walks in Cheshire
