= Henhull =

Former civil parish in Cheshire, England

Coordinates: 53.071°N 2.540°W

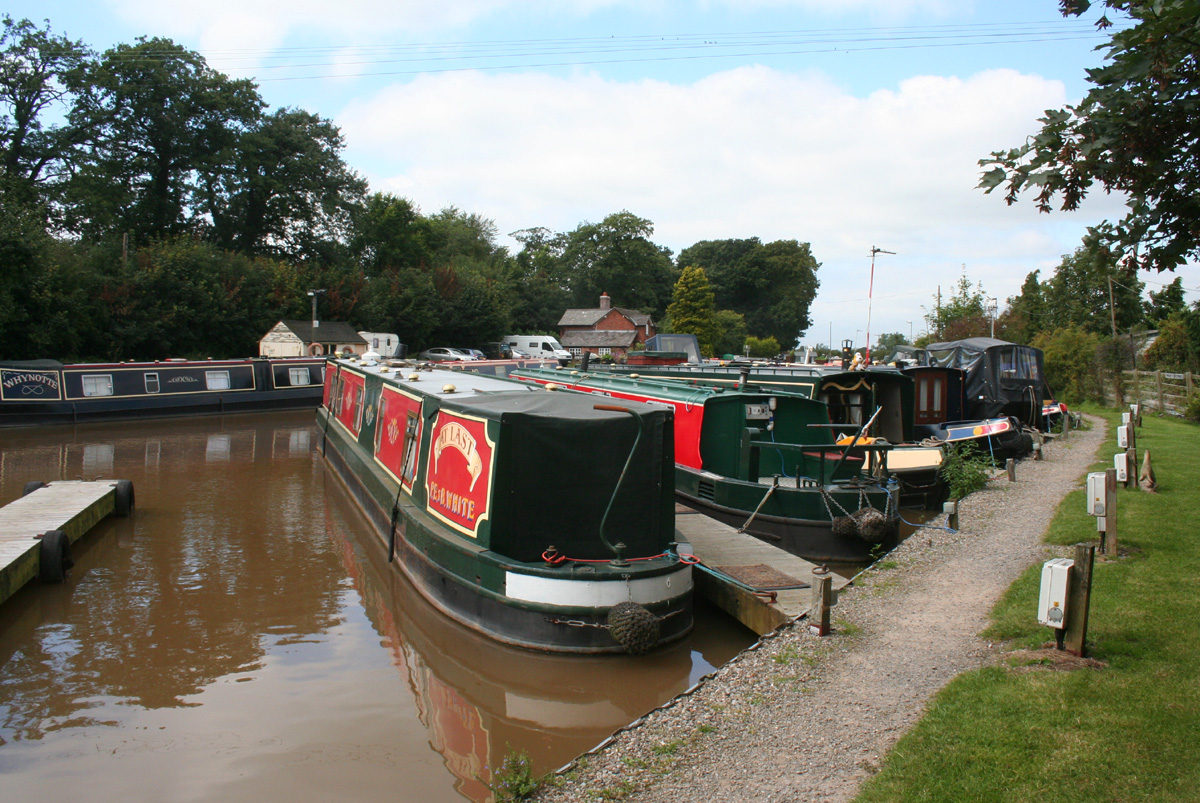
- Nantwich Marina, Basin End

- Location within Cheshire
- Population: 71 (2001)
- OS grid reference: SJ639528
- Civil parish: Burland and Acton; Nantwich
- Unitary authority: Cheshire East
- Ceremonial county: Cheshire
- Region: North West
- Country: England
- Sovereign state: United Kingdom
- Post town: NANTWICH
- Postcode district: CW5
- Dialling code: 01270
- Police: Cheshire
- Fire: Cheshire
- Ambulance: North West
- UK Parliament: Chester South and Eddisbury

Henhull is a former civil parish, now in the parishes of Burland and Acton and Nantwich, in the unitary authority area of Cheshire East and the ceremonial county of Cheshire, England, which lies to the north west of Nantwich. For administrative purposes, it was combined with adjacent civil parishes of Acton and Edleston to form a total area of 765 hectares (1890 acres). The parish was predominantly rural with scattered farms and houses and no large settlements. In 2019 a 1,100-house development called Kingsbourne was being built in the east of the parish as an extension to the town of Nantwich. Henhull civil parish also included the hamlets of Basin End, Bluestone, Welshmen's Green and part of Burford. Nearby villages include Acton and Rease Heath.

According to the 2001 census, Henhull had a population of 71. At the 2011 Census the population remained less than 100. In 2017, there were 26 households in the civil parish.

== History ==
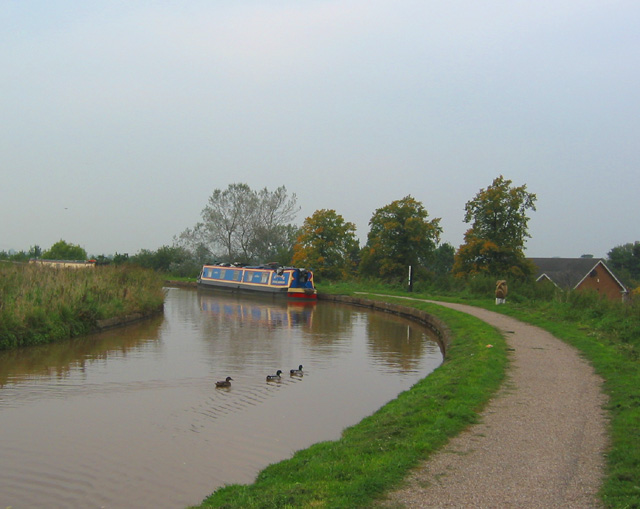
Embankment on the Shropshire Union Canal

Different meanings have been suggested for the name 'Henhull'. Hen Heol is Welsh for 'old street', which might refer to the Roman road from Middlewich to Whitchurch, excavated in 1987, which runs through the parish. Alternatively, Henhull or Henhill means a place for woodhens or other waterfowl.

The hamlet of Bluestone is named after a granite boulder glacial deposit situated near the Burford crossroads in Acton civil parish, which was unearthed during road building and is believed to originate from Cumbria. The name is thought to derive from blue porphyritic crystals, which are no longer visible. A local legend suggests that the boulder was thrown at Acton church from Bickerton Hill by the Devil.

The Battle of Nantwich of 1644 took place partly in Henhull, on the site of the present Nantwich Marina.

The parish of Henhull formerly had population figures of 45 (1801), 110 (1851), 102 (1901) and 59 (1951).

Henhull was formerly a township in the parish of Acton, from 1866 Henhull was a civil parish in its own right, on 1 April 2023 the parish was abolished to form "Burland and Acton", part also went to Nantwich.

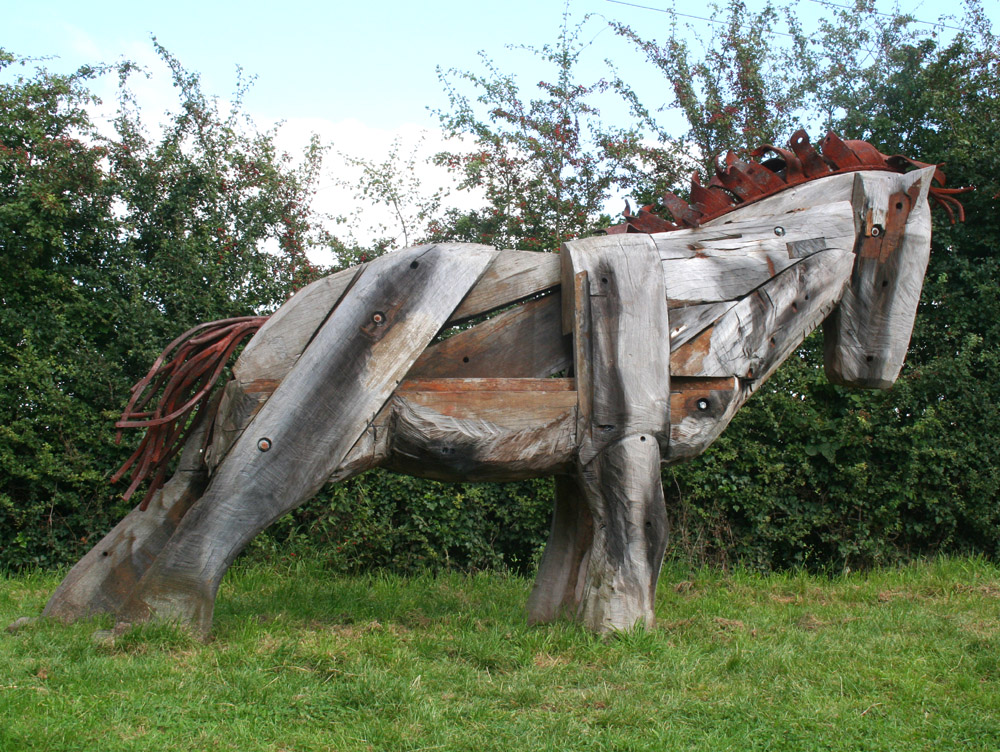
'Nantwich Horse' by John Merrill

== Geography and transport ==
The Shropshire Union Canal south of the Hurleston Junction runs through the parish from the south east to the north west; the southern part is raised on the Nantwich Embankment. The River Weaver runs along the eastern boundary of the parish. The A51 runs east–west along the northern boundary of the parish, crossing the canal at Henhull Bridge. The Crewe and Nantwich Circular Walk runs through the parish.

== Notable features ==
Nantwich Marina (at SJ639528) is at Basin End, the meeting point of the former Birmingham and Liverpool Junction Canal and Chester Canal, now both part of the Shropshire Union. Sculptures by the canal in this area form part of a community art project, including the 'Nantwich Horse', by John Merrill (sculptor)|John Merrill, constructed from recycled lock gates, hinges and bolts, which won a National Waterways Renaissance Award from the British Urban Regeneration Association in 2006.

A police dog training school is located on Welshmen's Lane.

== See also ==
- Listed buildings in Henhull

== Sources ==
- Latham FA, ed. Acton (The Local History Group; 1995) (ISBN 0 9522284 1 6)
