= Baddiley =

Civil parish in Cheshire, England

Coordinates: 53.033°N 2.601°W

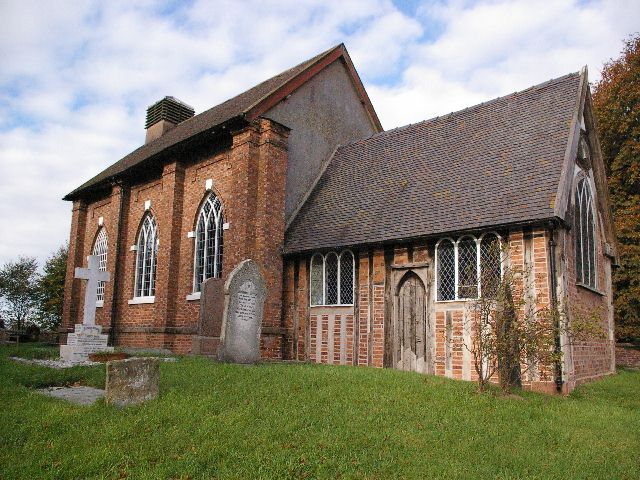
- St Michael's Church, Baddiley

- Location within Cheshire
- Population: 249 (2011)
- OS grid reference: SJ597486
- Civil parish: Baddiley
- Unitary authority: Cheshire East
- Ceremonial county: Cheshire
- Region: North West
- Country: England
- Sovereign state: United Kingdom
- Post town: NANTWICH
- Postcode district: CW5
- Dialling code: 01270
- Police: Cheshire
- Fire: Cheshire
- Ambulance: North West
- UK Parliament: Chester South and Eddisbury

Baddiley is a scattered settlement and civil parish in the unitary authority of Cheshire East and the ceremonial county of Cheshire, England. The civil parish also includes the north-western part of the village of Ravensmoor (also in the parish of Burland), as well as the small settlements of Baddiley Hulse, Batterley Hill, and parts of Gradeley Green and Swanley. According to the 2001 Census the parish had a total population of 226, increasing at the 2011 Census to 249.

The largest settlement within the parish, Ravensmoor centres on a crossroads with a small village green. It lies around six miles (ten kilometres) southwest of Crewe.

== History ==
Baddiley is listed in the Domesday Book as Bedelie, and the manor then belonged to the Praers family. The ancient manor was more extensive than the modern parish, also including Faddiley, which lies to the north west. In the first half of the 13th century, part of the Baddiley parish was granted to Combermere Abbey, a Cistercian monastery which had been endowed on its foundation in 1133 with a large area of land to the south; in 1355, the abbey also acquired the right to appoint the priest of the Baddiley church in exchange for land at Baddiley Grange. (Baddiley is not, however, included among the lands surrendered to the government when the abbey was dissolved in 1538.) By the 14th century, the manor had passed by marriage to the Bromley, Hondford and Mainwaring families, finally passing solely to the Mainwarings who occupied Baddiley Hall.

To the south and east of the Hall and the church of St Michael is an area of earthworks interpreted as the site of the medieval village.

The parish formerly had a population of 276 (1801), 281 (1851), 211 (1901) and 219 (1951). Much of the village of Ravensmoor dates from the second half of the 20th century.

== Geography and transport ==
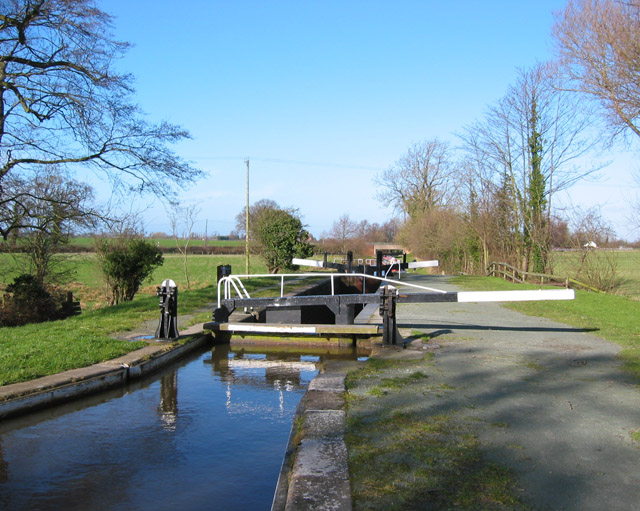
Baddiley Lock no. 1

Ravensmoor lies on the eastern boundary of the civil parish, at an elevation of 65 metres, around 2 1/4 miles (3.5 kilometres) southwest of Nantwich. Nearby settlements include the village of Wrenbury and the hamlets of Acton, Burland, Faddiley and Sound. Most of the civil parish is flat; the western edge, approaching the Weaver valley, is slightly more undulating in character, however, with a maximum elevation of 85 m. The land use is predominantly pasture, with some arable to the west.

The Llangollen branch of the Shropshire Union Canal passes through the parish. This stretch of canal immediately south of Hurleston Junction (where the Llangollen branch splits from the main Shropshire Union) has three grade-II-listed locks by J Fletcher and Thomas Telford. Constructed in blue-and-red brick with stone dressing, they date from 1805. The modern brick-and-concrete Baddiley Bridge carries the Nantwich road across the canal east of Baddiley Hulse (at SJ 607 494). There are also three older footbridges in traditional brick serving public rights of way: Halls Lane, Greenfield and an unnamed bridge.

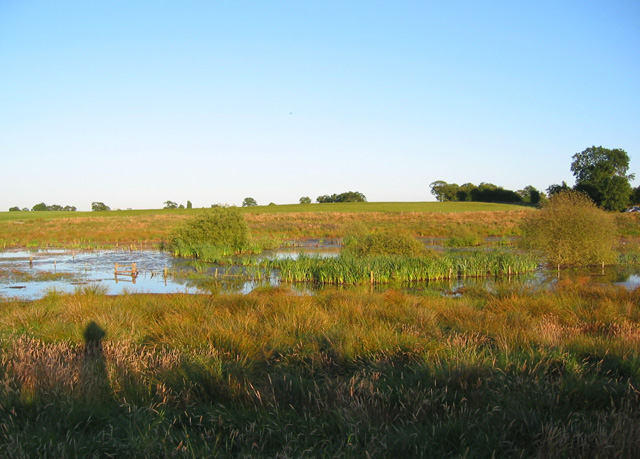
Hell Hole

West of Baddiley lie Baddiley Mere, the marshy Hell Hole and the small fishing lake of Baddiley Reservoir, and many smaller meres or ponds dot the countryside. The area is also crossed by the Ravensmoor and Edleston Brooks, and many unnamed tributaries.

Spinners Wood, a small area of mixed woodland (predominantly oak, birch, hazel and holly), planted by local volunteers in March 2000 to commemorate the millennium, stands just outside Ravensmoor (at SJ 620 505). Baddiley Gorse is a small deciduous wood by the Shropshire Union Canal (at SJ 610 509).

== Places of worship ==
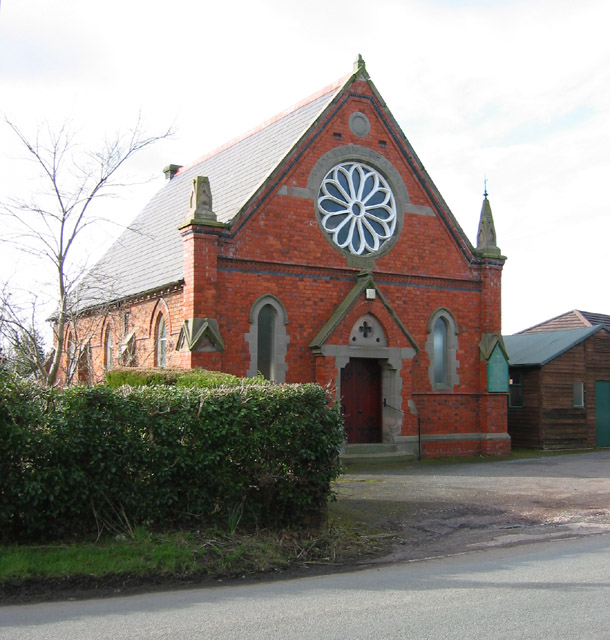
Baddiley & Ravensmoor Church

The grade-I-listed St Michael's Church, Baddiley (at SJ 604 502), is a rare example of a timber-framed church. Its chancel dates from 1308. Only a handful of churches of this type remain in England; other surviving examples include churches at Lower Peover and Marton (Cheshire), Melverley (Shropshire), Besford (Worcestershire) and Hartley Wespall (Hampshire). The original timber-framing was largely replaced by brick in 1811. The tympanum is one of the most interesting in England; it is dated 1663 but is structurally medieval and stands on an eight-foot screen.

The parish also contains the Baddiley and Ravensmoor Methodist Church, formerly a Wesleyan Chapel, located in Ravensmoor. Dated 1878, the building is in orange brick with stone dressing and has a prominent circular window and pillars capped with decorative stonework.

Historically, St Mary's at nearby Acton also served part of the civil parish of Baddiley.

== Other notable buildings ==
Other notable buildings within the parish include the grade-II-listed Baddiley Hall, an L-shaped three-storey building in brown brick dating from the late 17th century. Formerly the manor house of the Mainwaring family, it has been a farmhouse since the 19th century. Several other farmhouses within the parish are also listed, including Springe Lane Hall (early 17th century), Crabmill Farmhouse (early 19th century), and Baddiley Farmhouse and farm-buildings (c. 1870).

The Farmer's Arms public house stands at the crossroads opposite the village green in the centre of Ravensmoor.

== See also ==
- Listed buildings in Baddiley
