= Hundreds of Cheshire =

Geographic divisions of Cheshire, England

The Hundreds of Cheshire, as with other Hundreds in England, were the geographic divisions of Cheshire for administrative, military and judicial purposes. They were introduced in Cheshire some time before the Norman Conquest. Later on, both the number and names of the hundreds changed by processes of land being lost from Cheshire, and merging or amalgamation of remaining hundreds. The Ancient parishes of Cheshire were usually wholly within a specific hundred, although a few were divided between two hundreds.

== Establishment ==
Before the Norman Conquest, the largest and most important unit of local government in Anglo Saxon England was the shire. The shire system covered all of England except the far north. A shire was governed by the sheriff and the shire court. The Normans left this system largely unchanged, but they renamed shire as a county. The Normans extended the system into the north creating new counties of Rutland, Lancashire, Westmorland, Cumberland, Durham, and Northumberland. As the government in Norman and Angevin England retained the existing Hundeds in Cheshire, they were recorded in William the Conqueror's great landowning survey, the Domesday Book, in 1086.

=== Domesday Survey ===
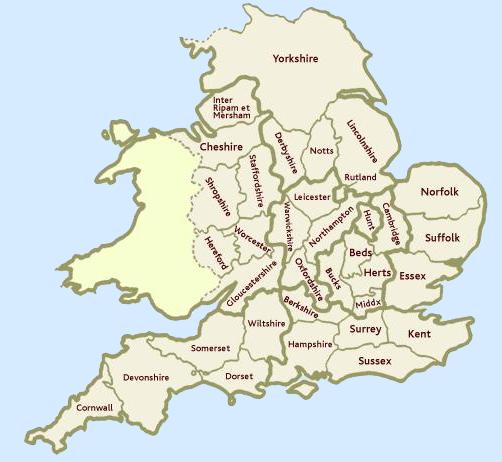
Cheshire and Inter Ripam et Mersam are English counties documented in the Domesday book of 1086.

There were 12 documented Hundreds within the borders of Cheshire in 1086.(The two hundreds that are now in Wales are shown in pink)

Cheshire, in the Domesday Book was recorded as a larger county than it is today. There is a small disagreement in published sources about where the northern boundary of Cheshire lay, and some parts of the border areas with Wales were disputed with the predecessors of Wales. One source states that the northern border was the River Ribble, resulting in large parts of what was to become Lancashire being at that time part of Cheshire. This area is included as "Inter Ripam et Mersam" in the Domesday Book. However, more recent sources confirm that the actual boundary at that time was the River Mersey. The ancient parish of Whitchurch in Hodnet Hundred appears in both Cheshire and Shropshire rolls of the Domesday Survey.

=== Cheshire Hundreds ===
The land south of the River Mersey was made up of twelve hundreds: Atiscross, Bochelau, Chester, Dudestan, Exestan, Hamestan, Middlewich, Riseton, Roelau, Tunendune, Warmundestrou and Wilaveston, with the hundreds of Atiscross and Exestan being disputed with the Kingdom of Gwynedd. (There are slight variations between various sources in the spellings of these names.) The hundreds in between the Mersey and the Ribble (Inter Ripam et Mersam) were: West Derby ("Derbei"), Newton ("Neweton"), Warrington ("Walingtune"), Salford, Blackburn ("Blacheburn") and Leyland ("Lailand").

This uncertain nature of the northern border lasted until 1182, when the land north of the Mersey became administered as part of the new county of Lancashire. Later, the hundreds of Atiscross and Exestan became firmly part of Wales, as did part of the Dudestan hundred.

== Subsequent hundreds ==
The Later Hundreds of Cheshire around 1850.

Over the years the remaining ten hundreds consolidated to just seven with changed names: Broxton, Bucklow, Eddisbury, Macclesfield, Nantwich, Northwich and Wirral. The date at which this process happened is not clear: These newer names are reported to be all in use by 1259 to 1260. The same source reports research that has found Macclesfield Hundred to be named in 1242 and Eddisbury Hundred by the late 12th century. Chester lost its hundred status, but was subsequently given the status of "county of itself" and was known as the City and County of Chester.

=== Broxton ===
This hundred was mainly formed from the old Dudestan hundred. The southern part of Dudestan was transferred to Wales where it was known as Maelor Saesneg, and (later still) "Flintshire Detached" (see Ancient county of Flintshire.) Broxton hundred from time to time contained all or part of the following parishes:

- Aldford
- Backford
- Bunbury (until 1866 – to Eddisbury hundred)
- Chester St. Mary on the Hill
- Chester St. Oswald
- Christleton
- Coddington
- Dodleston
- Eccleston
- Farndon
- Guilden Sutton
- Handley
- Harthill
- Malpas
- Plemstall
- Pulford
- Shocklach
- Tarvin
- Tattenhall
- Tilston
- Waverton

=== Bucklow ===
Bucklow was known to have been in existence at least as early as 1260. It was formed from the earlier Domesday hundreds of Bochelau and Tunendune.

=== Eddisbury ===
Eddisbury included the ancient parishes of:

- Barrow
- Bunbury (from Broxton hundred after 1866)
- Chester St. Oswald
- Delamere
- Frodsham
- Great Budworth
- Ince
- Little Budworth
- Middlewich
- Over
- Plemstall
- Tarporley
- Tarvin
- Thornton le Moors
- Weaverham cum Milton
- Whitegate

=== Macclesfield ===
Macclesfield was known to have been in existence at least as early as 1242. It was formed to a great extent from the earlier Domesday hundred of Hamestan.

=== Wirral ===
Wirral was formed from the earlier Domesday hundred of Wilaveston.
