= Ravensmoor =

Village in Cheshire, England

Coordinates: 53.050°N 2.566°W

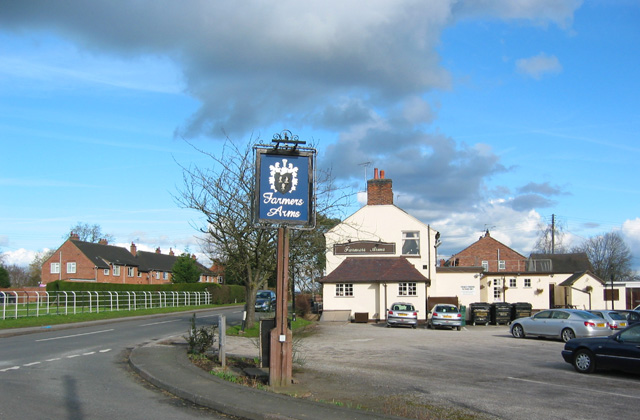
- Ravensmoor crossroads and village green

- Location within Cheshire
- OS grid reference: SJ620505
- Civil parish: Baddiley, Burland and Acton
- Unitary authority: Cheshire East
- Ceremonial county: Cheshire
- Region: North West
- Country: England
- Sovereign state: United Kingdom
- Post town: NANTWICH
- Postcode district: CW5
- Dialling code: 01270
- Police: Cheshire
- Fire: Cheshire
- Ambulance: North West
- UK Parliament: Chester South and Eddisbury

Ravensmoor is a village in the unitary authority of Cheshire East and the ceremonial county of Cheshire, England, located at SJ620505. It is split between the civil parishes of Baddiley and Burland and Acton. It lies at an elevation of 65 m, around 2 1/4 miles (3.6 km) south west of Nantwich and 6 miles (9.7 km) south west of Crewe.

The village centres on the crossroads of Baddiley Lane, Marsh Lane, Swanley Lane and Sound Lane, with a small village green adjacent. Much of the village dates from the second half of the 20th century.

The village lies within a fork of the Shropshire Union Canal south of the Hurleston Junction; the Llangollen branch runs 2/3 mile (1.1 km) to the west and the main line of the canal runs just over a mile to the east. Ravensmoor Brook runs to the east of the village and Edleston Brook to the south and west.

== Notable buildings ==
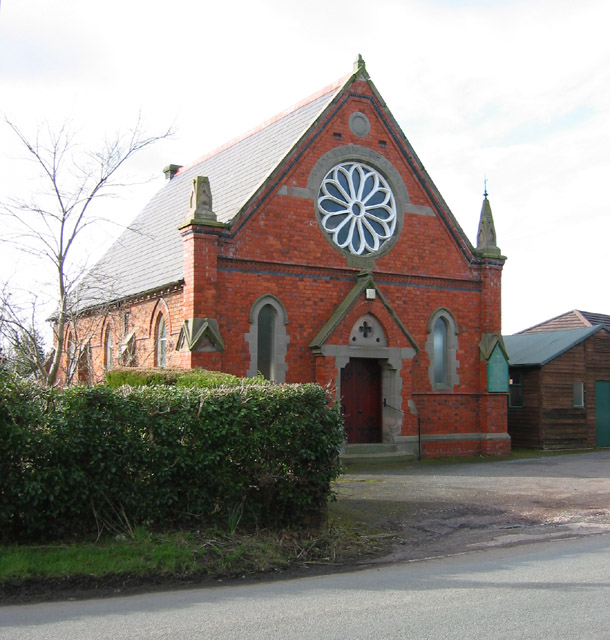
Baddiley & Ravensmoor Church

The Baddiley and Ravensmoor Methodist Church, formerly a Wesleyan Chapel, is located on Swanley Lane in the north west of the village (at SJ620507). Dated 1878, the building is in orange brick with stone dressing and has a prominent circular window and pillars capped with decorative stonework.

The Farmer's Arms public house stands at the crossroads.

== Other features ==
Spinners Wood, a small area of mixed woodland (predominantly oak, birch, hazel and holly), planted by local volunteers in March 2000 to commemorate the millennium, stands on the edge of the village to the south west (at SJ620505).
