= Cholmondeston =

Village in Cheshire, England

Coordinates: 53.13°N 2.56°W

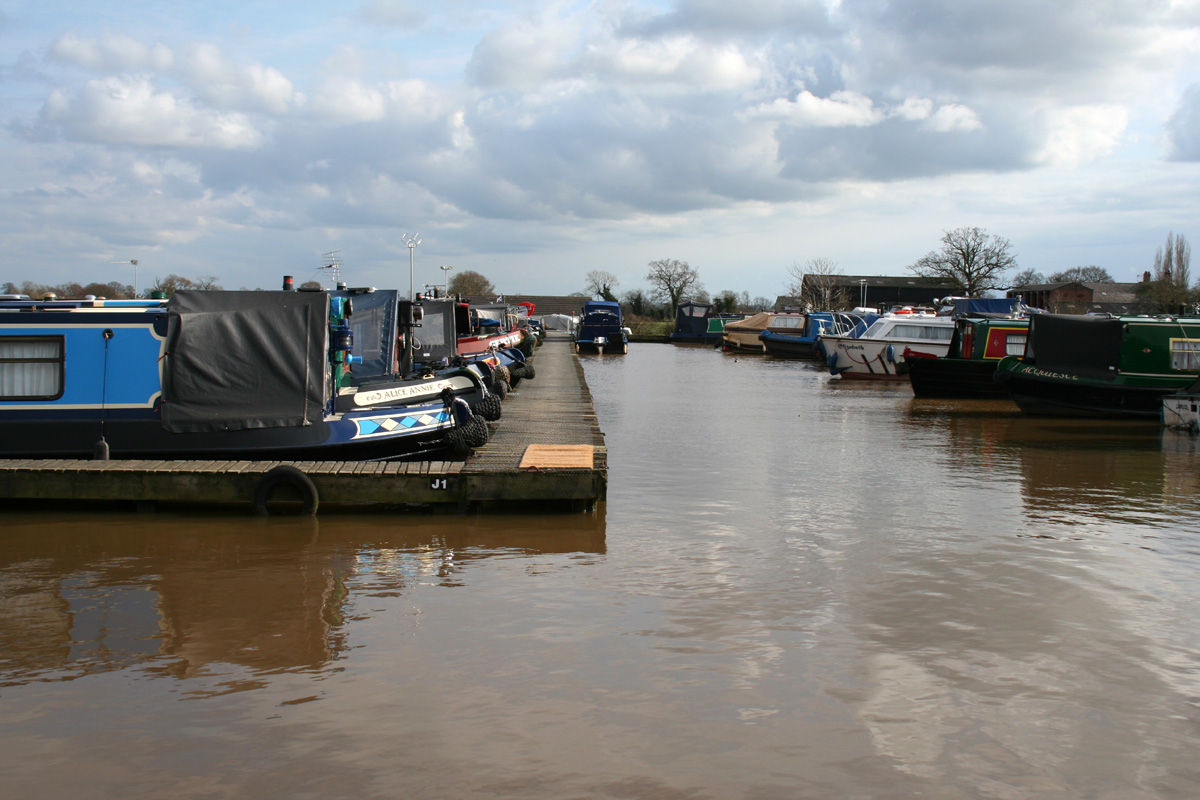
- Shropshire Union Canal at Venetian Marina

- Location within Cheshire
- Population: 175 (2011)
- OS grid reference: SJ628599
- Civil parish: Cholmondeston and Wettenhall
- Unitary authority: Cheshire East
- Ceremonial county: Cheshire
- Region: North West
- Country: England
- Sovereign state: United Kingdom
- Post town: Nantwich
- Postcode district: CW5
- Dialling code: 01270
- Police: Cheshire
- Fire: Cheshire
- Ambulance: North West
- UK Parliament: Chester South and Eddisbury

Cholmondeston (/ˈtʃʌmstən/ CHUM-stən) is a village and civil parish in the unitary authority of Cheshire East and the ceremonial county of Cheshire, England. The village lies 5 miles (8 km) to the northwest of Nantwich. Nearby villages include Aston juxta Mondrum, Barbridge, Calveley and Wettenhall. The Middlewich Branch of the Shropshire Union Canal and the Chester and Crewe Railway runs through the civil parish. The area is predominantly rural, with a total population of around 150 in 2001, increasing to 175 at the 2011 Census.

== History ==
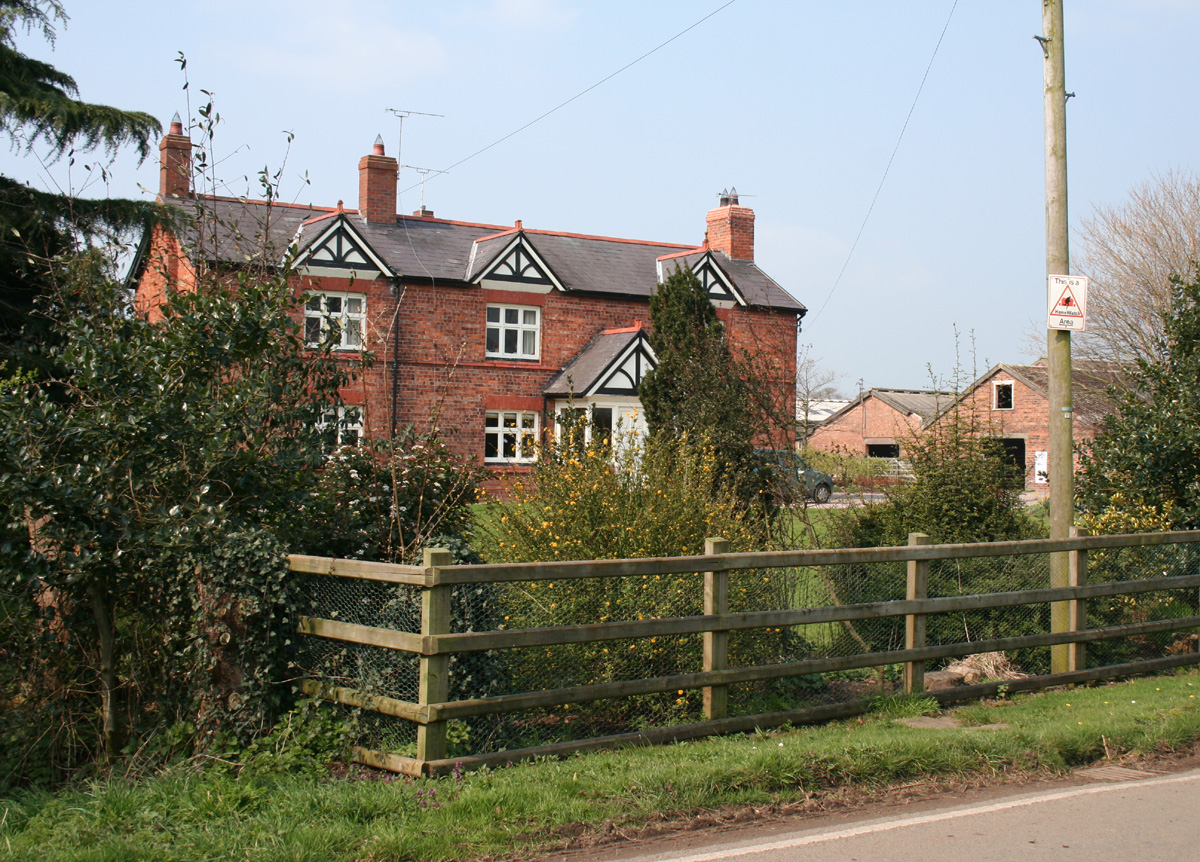
Gates Farm, where John Wesley stayed

A hoard of 26 Roman coins was found in Cholmondeston, suggesting the possibility of Roman settlement in the area. The coins are mainly of the reign of Constantius II, dating from after 348.

Cholmondeston appears in the Domesday survey of 1086 as Chelmundestone, meaning "Coelmund's Farmstead" or "Village". Before the Norman Conquest, it was held by Wulfeva, described as "a free woman", and afterwards by William Malbank (or Malbedeng), the first Baron of Wich Malbank (Nantwich). Local historian Frank Latham suggests that it is possible that there was a substantial pre-Conquest village, later deserted. The Domesday survey recorded a population of 4. At this time, Cholmondeston fell within the Forest of Mondrem, the southern half of Delamere Forest. The manor maintained an under-forester and also paid frithmote tax, which might have entitled it to certain forest privileges or exempted it from the forest courts. The area of the modern civil parish fell within the ancient parish of Acton in the Nantwich Hundred; it was served by St Mary's Church, Acton until 1873.

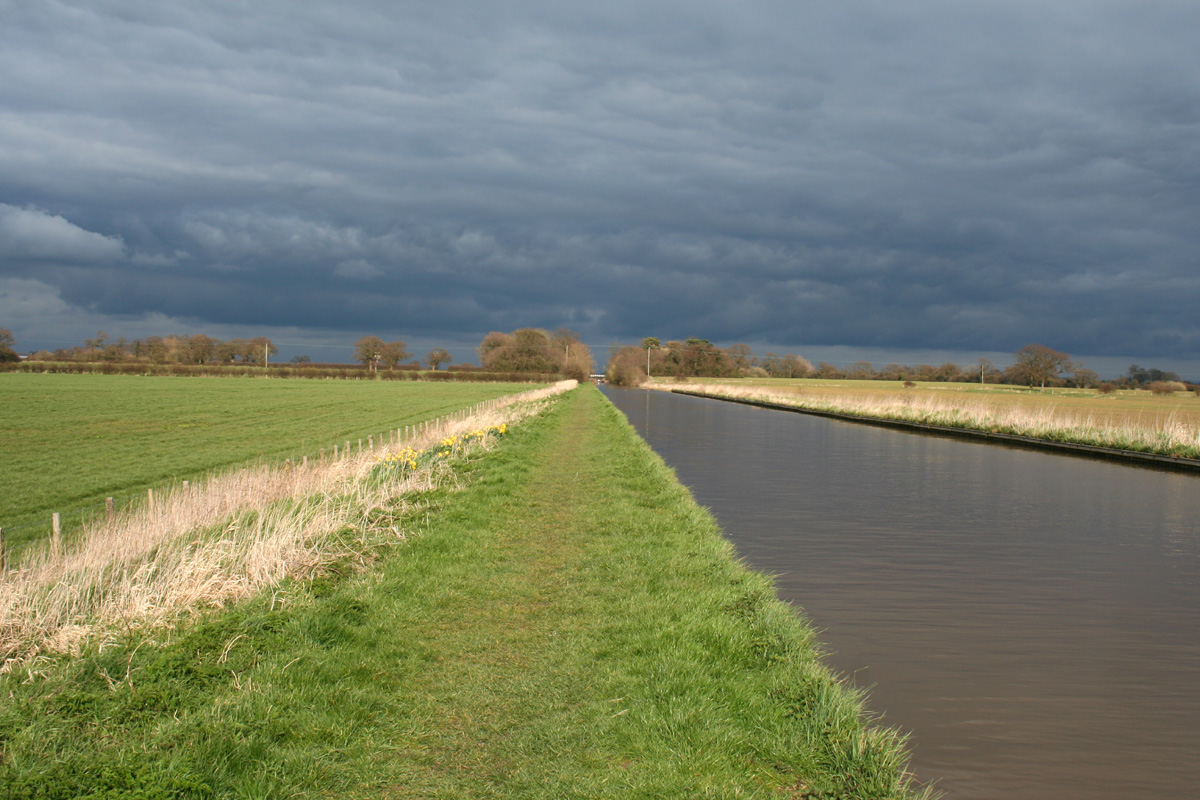
Flat pasture by the Shropshire Union Canal

Early landowners include the Crewe and Wettenhall families. The township was sold by the Earl of Bridgewater to the Werden family in 1686, and by 1800 it had passed to the Drummond family.

In the 18th century, Methodists were recorded in Cholmondeston, as well as in the adjacent parish of Poole, which John Wesley visited four times between 1751 and 1757. Wesley is believed to have stayed at Gates Farm, just inside the Cholmondeston boundary, and he preached in the farm's kitchen. A Wesleyan Methodist Chapel was built in Cholmondeston in 1833. It was replaced by a later red-brick chapel, built from the Twentieth Century Fund, which opened in 1903. The chapel closed in 1973.

== Governance ==
Cholmondeston is administered by Cholmondeston and Wettenhall Parish Council jointly with the adjacent civil parish of Wettenhall. From 1974 the civil parish was served by Crewe and Nantwich Borough Council, which was succeeded on 1 April 2009 by the unitary authority of Cheshire East. Since 2024 Cholmondeston has been within the parliamentary constituency of Chester South and Eddisbury which is represented by Aphra Brandreth of the Conservative Party.

== Geography, economy and transport ==
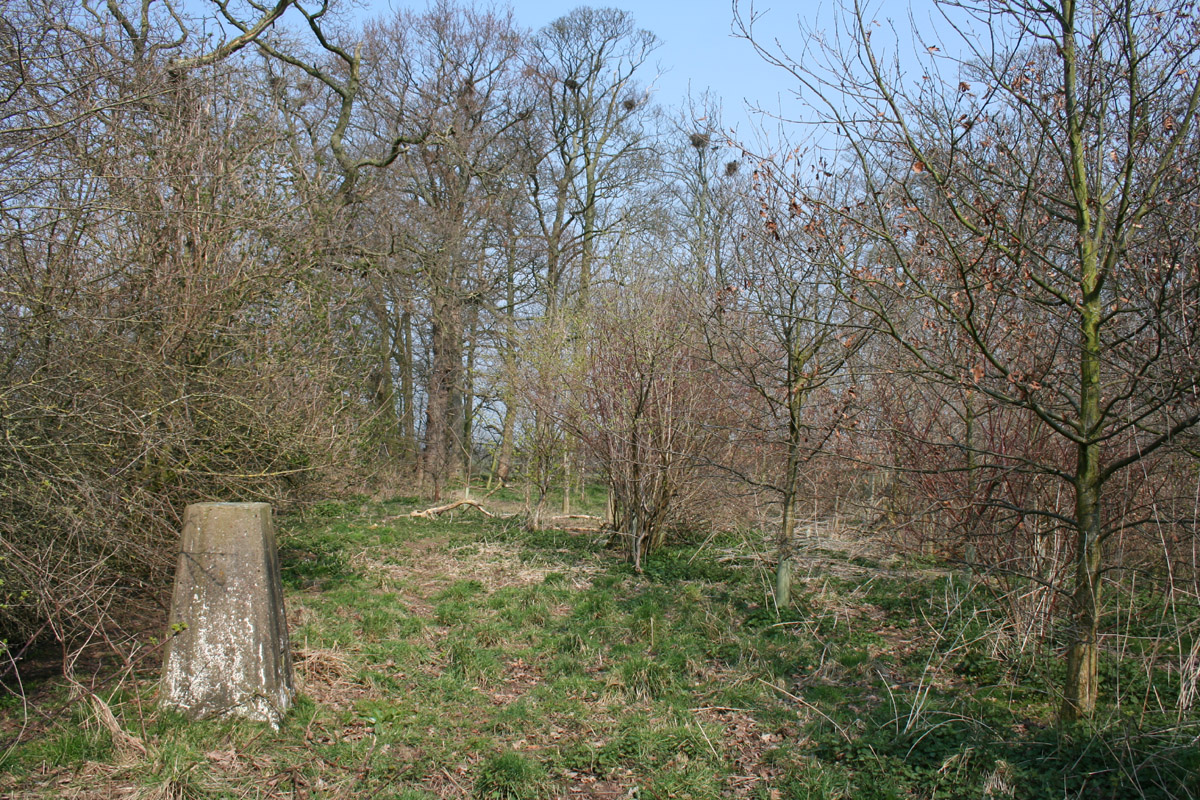
Trig point in woodland

The civil parish has a total area of 1,749 acres (708 ha). The terrain is predominantly flat, with an average elevation of around 50 metres. A trig point is located at SJ631567, at an elevation of 55 metres. Crowton Brook runs north–south through the civil parish and Bankside Brook forms part of the northern boundary; there are numerous scattered small meres and ponds. Several small areas of woodland are located within the civil parish. The small village of Cholmondeston (SJ628599) lies in the north of the civil parish at the junction between Winsford Road, Minshull Lane and Calveley Green Lane. The area is predominantly rural, with the major land use being agricultural.

The Chester and Crewe Railway runs east–west through the south of the civil parish. It crosses the Middlewich Branch of the Shropshire Union Canal, which also runs broadly east–west, immediately east of Venetian Marina. Two other canal bridges lie in the civil parish. Just to the west of the marina is Cholmondeston Bridge (SJ634576), which carries Winsford Road. Benyon's Bridge is an accommodation (farm) bridge over the canal at SJ628573. Built in 1827–33 to a design by Thomas Telford, it is listed at grade II. Immediately adjacent to Cholmondeston Bridge is Cholmondeston Lock, the first lock on the Middlewich branch.

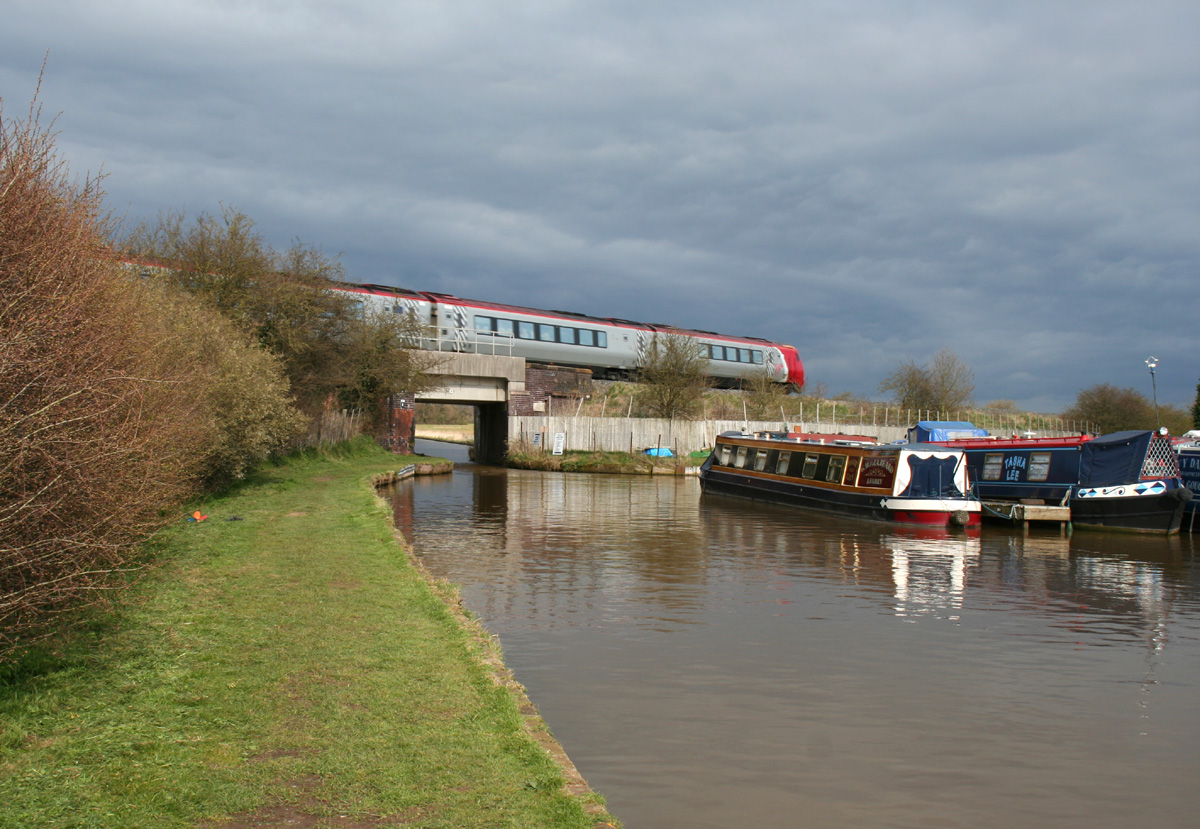
Railway bridge over the Shropshire Union Canal

The unclassified Winsford Road is the major road of the civil parish; it runs broadly north–south, leading to Wettenhall and Winsford to the north, and joining the A51 near Nantwich to the south. In Cholmondeston village, Minshull Lane runs east from Winsford Road to connect with the B5074 at Wades Green near Church Minshull, while Calveley Green Lane runs west to connect with Calveley Hall Lane in Calveley. In the south of the civil parish, Stokehall Lane runs west from Winsford Road to connect with the A51 at Barbridge.

The National Cycle Network Regional Route 75 follows Winsford Road. The Weaver Way footpath follows the towpath of the Shropshire Union Canal, connecting with the Crewe and Nantwich Circular Walk just to the east of the civil parish at Brickyard Bridge.

== Landmarks ==
The Venetian Marina on the Shropshire Union Canal opened in the early 1970s. As of 2010, it has 250 berths; facilities include workshops, tearooms and a shop. The only listed building in the parish is the Grade II listed Benyon's Bridge, over the canal west of the marina.

== Demography ==
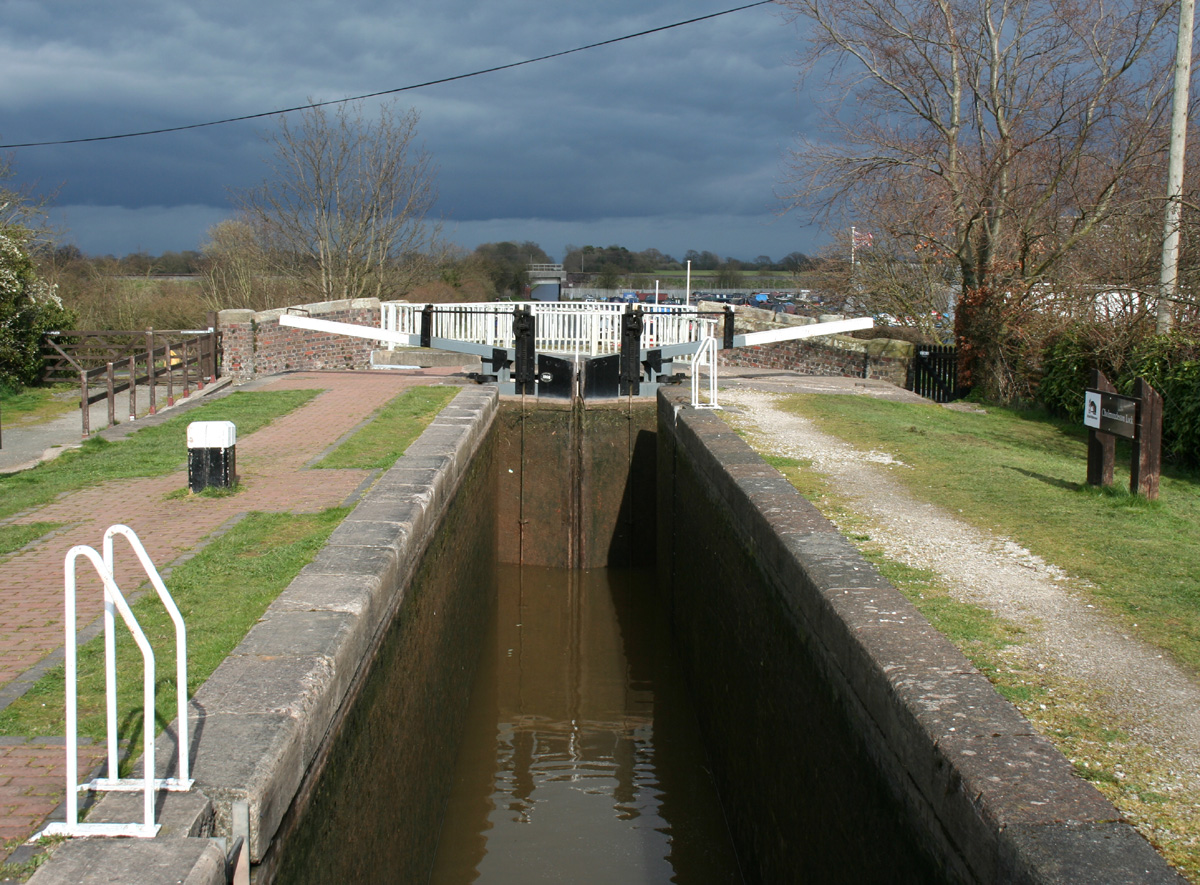
Cholmondeston Lock

In 2006, the total population of the civil parish was estimated as 170. The 2001 census recorded a population of 153, in 53 households. The population has stayed relatively constant since 1801; the historical population figures are 168 (1801), 186 (1851), 162 (1901) and 172 (1951).

== Education ==
There are no educational facilities within the civil parish. Cholmondeston falls within the catchment areas of Calveley Primary School in Calveley and Tarporley High School in Tarporley.
