= Barrets Green =

Small settlement in Cheshire East, England

Coordinates: 53.128878°N 2.613078°W

- Location within Cheshire
- OS grid reference: SJ59075925
- Unitary authority: Cheshire East
- Ceremonial county: Cheshire
- Region: North West
- Country: England
- Sovereign state: United Kingdom
- Police: Cheshire
- Fire: Cheshire
- Ambulance: North West

Barrets Green is a small settlement in the unitary authority of Cheshire East and the ceremonial county of Cheshire, England. It lies on the A51 (Nantwich Road) at SJ59075925, by the junction with Long Lane (to Wettenhall), at an elevation of 56 metres. Local farms include Barrets Green Farm and The Grange. For administrative purposes, Barrets Green falls mainly within the civil parish of Alpraham, with a small part in Calveley; it is approximately 1/4 miles from each of these two villages.

As of 2016, Barrets Green is served by the Arriva North West Chester–Crewe bus route 84, with a stop near the Long Lane junction on the A51.
