= Calveley railway station =

Disused railway station in Cheshire, England

Calveley
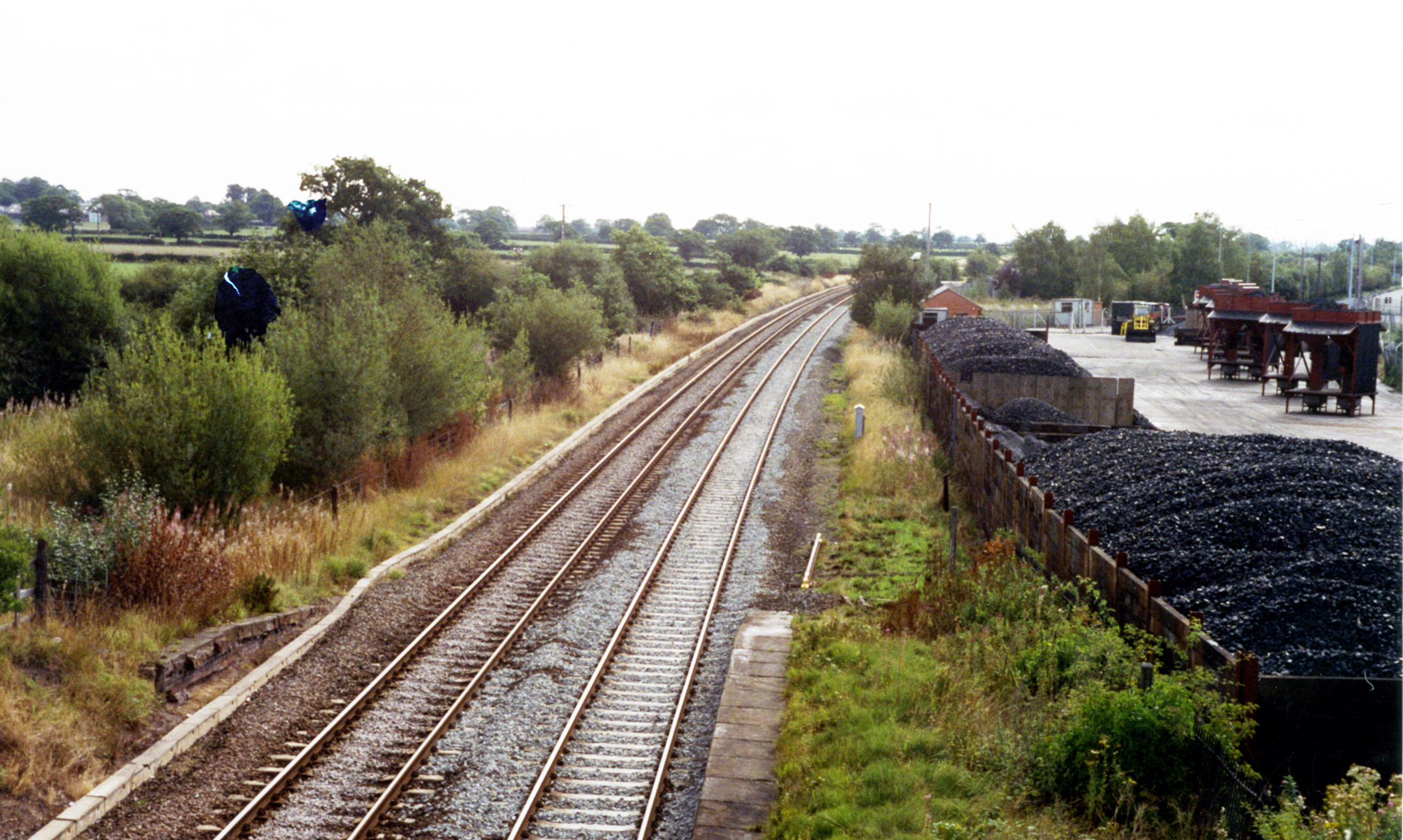
- Site of the station in 1990

General information
- Location: Calveley, Cheshire; England
- Coordinates: 53.1247°N 2.6115°W
- Grid reference: SJ590588
- Platforms: 2

Other information
- Status: Disused

History
- Original company: Grand Junction Railway
- Pre-grouping: London and North Western Railway
- Post-grouping: London, Midland and Scottish Railway

Key dates
- 1 October 1840: Opened
- 7 March 1960: Closed
Location

Calveley railway station (originally Highwayside) was located in the centre of the small village of Calveley, Cheshire, England.

== History ==
Opened 1 October 1840 by the Grand Junction Railway, it was served by what was the Chester and Crewe Railway (now the North Wales Coast Line) between Chester, Cheshire and Crewe, Cheshire. It was 8 miles (13 km) from the large railway centre of Crewe.

Renamed Calveley five years after opening, the station had two platforms with the main station building being located on the up line. The Shropshire Union Canal was close by so warehouses and sidings were built for exchange of goods between the canal and railway, the goods yard building still exists. There was also a siding laid in 1928 for United Dairies, who had a major plant collecting Cheshire milk and sending it to their London, Scrubs Lane depot. The United Dairies sidings could hold 10 tank wagons, and in 1933 were processing up to 3,000 imperial gallons (14,000 L; 3,600 US gal) of milk a day. Like most stations, there were also coal sidings.

In 1947 King George VI and Elizabeth Bowes-Lyon visited the station and local church.

Passenger services ended 7 March 1960 and all services 2 November 1964, as part of the closure of all five intermediate stations between Chester and Crewe. The milk siding may have remained in use beyond this, but the milk depot was closed on 2 October 1965. Remains of both platforms can still be seen.

Preceding station	Historical railways	Following station
Worleston; Line open, station closed	London and North Western Railway; North Wales Coast Line	Beeston Castle and Tarporley; Line open, station closed
