= Travelers Rest =

Travelers Rest or Traveller's Rest may refer to:

== In the United States ==
- Traveler's Rest (Shelby City, Kentucky), a historic property in Lincoln County, Kentucky, associated with Isaac Shelby
- Travelers Rest (Toccoa, Georgia), a historic building listed on the NRHP in Stephens County, Georgia
- Travellers Rest, Macon County, Georgia, an unincorporated community
- Travellers Rest, Kentucky, an unincorporated community
- Traveller's Rest (Natchez, Mississippi)
- Traveler's Rest (Lolo, Montana), a historic site listed on the NRHP in Montana, associated with the Lewis and Clark Expedition
- Travelers Rest, South Carolina, a city
- Travellers Rest (Nashville, Tennessee), historic house listed on the NRHP in Tennessee, associated with John Overton
- Travelers Rest (Burlington, West Virginia), historic stage stop on the Northwestern Turnpike
- Traveller's Rest (Kearneysville, West Virginia), Horatio Gates' home, now a National Historic Landmark

== In Australia ==
- Travellers Rest, Tasmania, a peri-urban settlement near Launceston
- Travellers Rest Inn, a heritage-listed former inn and residences and now offices at 12, 14 and 16 O'Connell Street, Parramatta, NSW

== In Canada ==
- Travellers Rest, an unincorporated community in Lot 19, Prince Edward Island near Summerside, at the junction of routes 1A and 2

== In the United Kingdom ==
- Travellers Rest, Alpraham, a pub in Cheshire

== See also ==
- Travellers' Rest Inn
- Traveller’s Repose
- Travelers Hotel
