= Stoke, Cheshire East =

Former civil parish in Cheshire, England

Coordinates: 53.101°N 2.566°W

Stoke
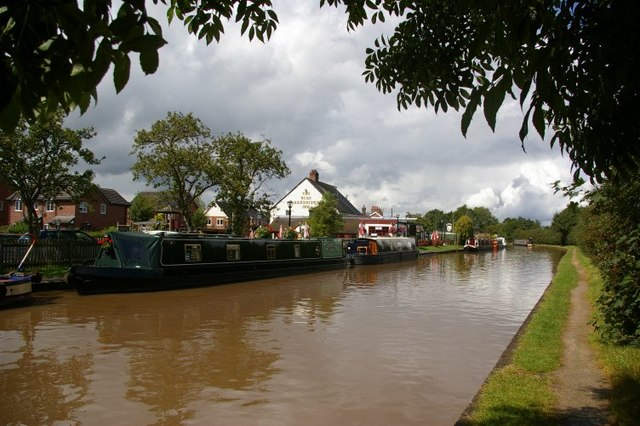
- Shropshire Union Canal main line at Barbridge

- Location within Cheshire
- Population: 201 (2001)
- OS grid reference: SJ620560
- Civil parish: Stoke and Hurleston
- Unitary authority: Cheshire East
- Ceremonial county: Cheshire
- Region: North West
- Country: England
- Sovereign state: United Kingdom
- Post town: NANTWICH
- Postcode district: CW5
- Dialling code: 01270
- Police: Cheshire
- Fire: Cheshire
- Ambulance: North West
- UK Parliament: Chester South and Eddisbury

Stoke is a former civil parish, now in the parish of Stoke and Hurleston, in the unitary authority area of Cheshire East and the ceremonial county of Cheshire, England. The parish was predominantly rural with a total population of 201 in 2001, measured with the inclusion of Hurleston at 324 in the 2011 Census. The largest settlement was Barbridge (at SJ615566), which lies 3½ miles to the north west of Nantwich. The parish also included the small settlements of Stoke Bank (SJ616565) and Verona (SJ618559). Nearby villages include Aston juxta Mondrum, Burland, Calveley, Haughton, Rease Heath and Wardle.

== History ==
Stoke means "hamlet", from the Anglo-Saxon. It formed part of the ancient Forest of Mondrum. Stoke is not mentioned by name in the Domesday survey; the name was first recorded in 1260. Barbridge is mentioned in John Leland's Itinerary from a visit of 1536. The civil parish was originally a township in the ancient parish of Acton in the Nantwich Hundred; it was served by St Mary's Church, Acton. The manor was given by Randal de Praers to his son, who assumed the name Stoke, and later passed to the Beeston and Aston families. By 1622, it was held by the Minshull family of Stoke Hall. The manor was held by the Wilbraham family from 1753 to 1781, and was then sold to the Craven family. From 1866 Stoke was a civil parish in its own right, on 1 April 2023 the parish was abolished and merged with Hurleston to form "Stoke and Hurleston".

During the Civil War, Stoke was occupied by royalist forces in December 1643, together with much of the surrounding area. In the 17th–19th centuries, the area appears to have had a substantial Quaker population; a graveyard at Stoke Grange Farm was given to the movement in 1657 and remained in use until the mid-19th century. During World War II, Stoke Manor provided accommodation for land girls.

Barbridge had a watermill on Mill Pool Lane which was used until the 1880s. A smithy was active until the late 1940s. In the mid-19th century, an agricultural business was based in Barbridge which supplied machinery internationally, and a small engineering firm was later based in Stoke.

== Governance ==
Stoke was administered by Stoke and Hurleston Parish Council jointly with the adjacent civil parish of Hurleston. From 1974 the civil parish was served by Crewe and Nantwich Borough Council, which was succeeded on 1 April 2009 by the unitary authority of Cheshire East. Stoke falls in the parliamentary constituency of Chester South and Eddisbury, which has been represented since the 2024 general election by Aphra Brandreth of the Conservative Party. It was previously part of the Eddisbury constituency, which since its establishment in 1983 had been held by the Conservative MPs Alastair Goodlad (1983–99), Stephen O'Brien (1999–2015), Antoinette Sandbach (2015–19) and Edward Timpson (2019–24).

== Geography, transport and economy ==
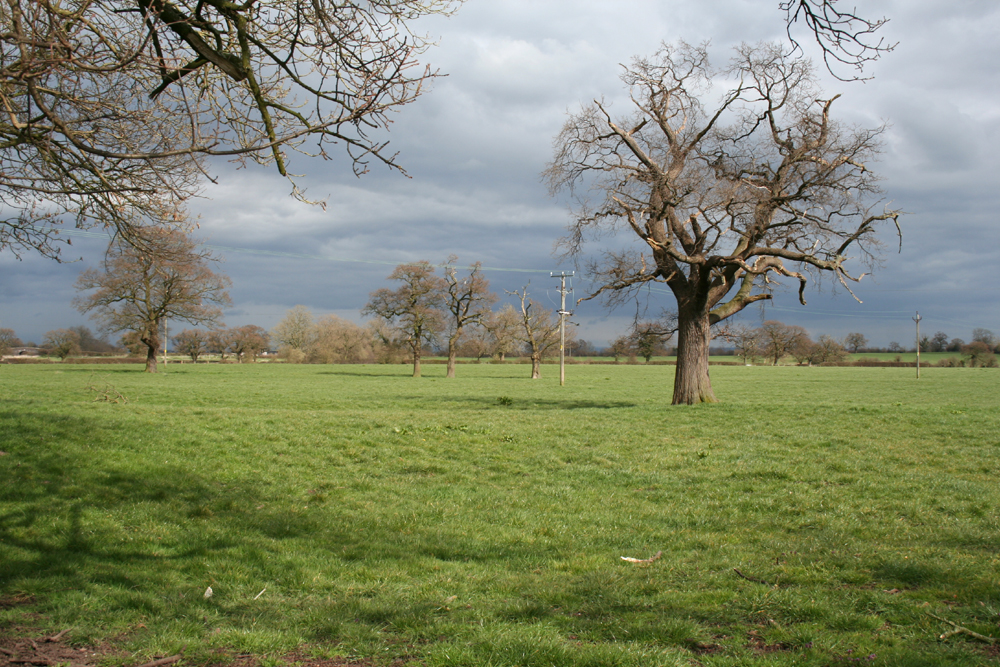
Pasture near Stoke Hall Farm

The civil parish has a total area of 662 acres (268 ha). The major land use is agricultural, predominantly dairy farming. The parish includes several small areas of woodland, including The Rookery (SJ625565). The north-eastern part of Hurleston Reservoir falls in Stoke (the majority is in Hurleston), and there is also a small lake in the grounds of Stoke Hall, as well as several unnamed brooks and scattered small meres. The high point of the civil parish, south of Stoke Bank, has an elevation of around 60 metres; the ground slopes gently downwards to the east, with a low point of around 40 metres south of The Rookery.

The Barbridge Junction on the Shropshire Union Canal lies just to the north of the parish; the main line of the canal runs north–south through the parish and the Middlewich Branch runs east–west across it. Hurleston Junction also lies immediately south of the parish in Hurleston. The A51 (Chester Road) runs north–south through the parish; Stokehall Lane connects the A51 at Barbridge with Wettenhall Road via Bremilow's Bridge.

== Demography ==
In 2006, the total population of the civil parish was estimated as 210. The 2001 census recorded a population of 201, in 94 households. The historical population figures were 127 (1801), 143 (1851), 191 (1901), 229 (1951) and 156 (1971).

== Landmarks ==
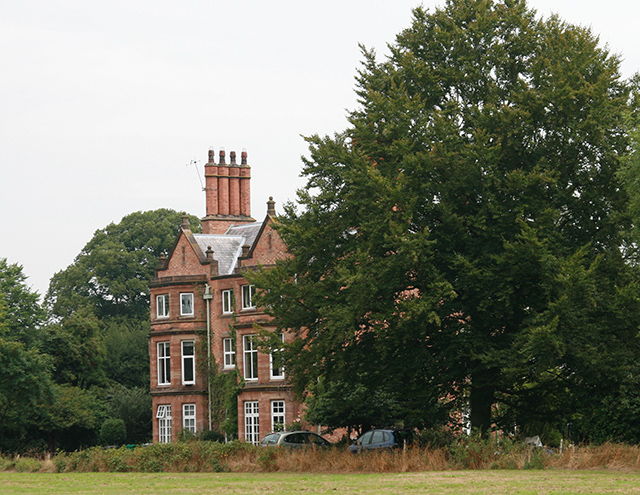
Stoke Manor

The grade-II-listed Stoke Hall (SJ622567) on Stokehall Lane is a large L-shaped mansion in red brick dating originally from the early 17th century, but with a 19th-century appearance. The hall originally belonged to the Minshull family, who owned the manor of Stoke in the 17th century. A disused dovecote with a bell turret in the grounds of the hall dates from the late 18th century; it is also listed at grade II.

Stoke Manor (SJ620558) is a red-brick manor house near Verona, now owned by the County Council and converted into flats. The farmhouse of Verona dates from the 18th century; it was described as haunted in Egerton Leigh's Cheshire Legends of 1867.

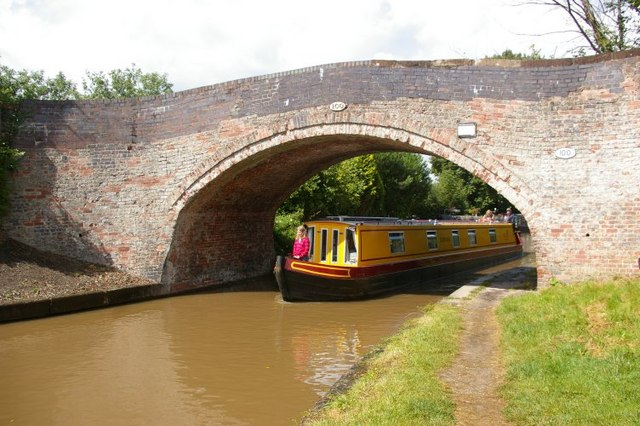
Bremilow's Bridge

The former Barbridge post office (now a private house) on Chester Road dates from the late 17th century. Stoke Cottage on Mill Pool Lane is an L-shaped brick building dating from the early 18th century which was extended in 1856. Both buildings are listed at grade II. Stoke Methodist Chapel (SJ615565) in Barbridge was built in 1845. Barbridge has a public house, The Olde Barbridge Inn.

Two canal bridges are listed at grade II. Bremilow's Bridge (SJ616566) is a road bridge over the canal main line at Barbridge, which dates from around 1779 and was designed by Thomas Telford. Sandhole Bridge crosses the Middlewich Branch at SJ622572 and was also designed by Telford.

== Education ==
There are no educational facilities within the civil parish. The parish falls within the catchment areas of Calveley School in Calveley and Tarporley High School in Tarporley.

== Notable residents ==
General James Wolfe, hero of the Battle of Quebec of 1759, is supposed to have spent some of his childhood at Yew Tree House near Verona. Train driver Wallace Oakes, born in Barbridge, was awarded a posthumous George Cross in 1965 for safely stopping a Crewe–Carlisle train which had an engine fire; he died of his injuries a few days after the incident. A locomotive was later named in his honour.

== See also ==
- Listed buildings in Stoke, Cheshire East
