= Gilbert de Venables =

Norman lord

Gilbert de Venables, aka Gilbert the Hunter, was a Norman lord who participated in the Norman Conquest of England. He was born in Venables, Eure, presumably the grandson of Odo II, Count of Blois (since he is mentioned as younger brother of Stephen, Count of Blois by Sir Peter Leycester). He was also a kinsman of Hugh d'Avranches, Earl of Chester and fought in his retinue during the Norman Conquest. His second wife was Margery, daughter of Waltheof (son of Wolfric, lord of Halton). Their children were William and Amabilia.

Gilbert was the first baron of Kinderton and the progenitor of the English de Venables family; his grandson Gilbert II de Venables also held the title of Baron of Kinderton. Gilbert was one of the nine barons of the county-palatine of Chester. Although his name derives from Venables, Eure it is likely that he was the huntsman who served the Duke of Normandy based on the etymology; "Veneur" (huntsman), and "Abilis" (able). His seal was a falcon sinister regardant although his descendants used a variation of the coat of arms of the counts of Blois, which suggests this was his coat of arms too.

Gilbert issued a charter in 1087 in which Ralph de Brereton was a witness. There has been speculation that ever since Ralph de Brereton, there has been a close relationship between the de Venables and the de Brereton, possibly that the Breretons acted as the de Venables squire/attendant. Since the de Breretons were given Gilbert's third most valuable fief and were recorded as witnesses in his charters, it is likely that this was the case.

== Lands ==
Gilbert had his chief seat at Kinderton Castle but he also owned 20 other manors; Alpraham, Baguley, Blakenhall, Brereton, Davenport, Eccleston, Fifehead Magdalen, Hartford, High Legh, Hope, Exestan, Lymm, Mere, Peover, Newbold Astbury, Rostherne, Sinderland, Tarporley, Wettenhall, Wincham, and Witton. By far his most profitable manors were Fifehead Magdalen (worth 7 pounds), Eccleston (2 pounds 10 shillings), Brereton (1 pound), and Blakenhall (12 shillings) for a total of 11 pounds and 2 shillings. His 17 other manors (including Kinderton) combined brought him just 5 pounds 3 shillings; meaning his annual income in 1086 was 16 pounds 5 shillings, with more than 2/3s of his income coming from Fifehead Magdalen, Eccleston, Brereton, and Blakenhall.

In addition to his lands Gilbert had certain rights, productive enterprises, and other buildings on some of his fiefs; at Eccleston he had a boat and nets (for fishing), at Hartford he had a Salthouse, a smith, and a knight, at Lymm he had a church, at High Legh he had a church, at Mere he had a church, at Peaover he had geld in bovates, at Brereton he had a mill worth 12d, at Witton he had a mill worth 3s, and at Blackenhall he had an Eyrie.

In all his fiefs, Gilbert held 50 units of ploughland, 5446 acres of woodland, 12 acres of meadow, and 30 hides paying geld. Living on his land, he had 100 households, which could have meant between 400 and 600 people or perhaps more.

== Sources ==
- Davies, R. R. (1987). The Age of Conquest: Wales, 1063–1415. Oxford University Press.
- Highet, T. P. (1960). The Early History of the Davenports of Davenport. Vol. IX. Manchester University Press.
