= Worleston railway station =

Former railway station in England

Worleston
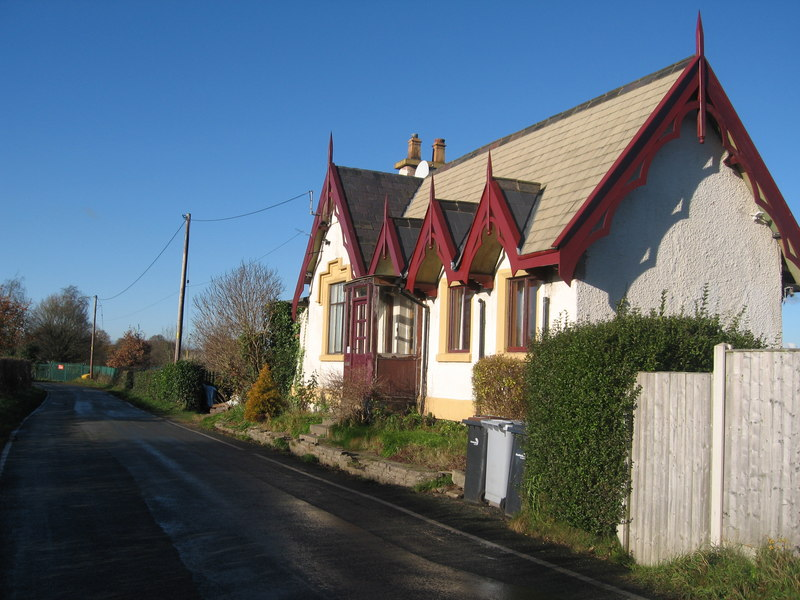
- The station building in 2017

General information
- Location: Worleston, Cheshire; England
- Coordinates: 53.1099°N 2.5131°W
- Grid reference: SJ656571
- Platforms: 2

Other information
- Status: Disused

History
- Original company: Grand Junction Railway
- Pre-grouping: London and North Western Railway
- Post-grouping: London, Midland and Scottish Railway

Key dates
- 1 October 1840: Opened
- 1 September 1952: closed for passengers
- 30 November 1959: Closed for freight
Location

Worleston railway station was located just north of the small village of Worleston, Cheshire, England.

== History ==
Opened 1 October 1840 by the Grand Junction Railway, it was served by what was the Chester and Crewe Railway (now part of the North Wales Coast Line) between Chester, Cheshire and Crewe, Cheshire.

The station was originally named Nantwich until the town got its own station in 1858. There were two platforms, the brick built ticket office being on the down platform and a wooden waiting room on the up platform. Both were connected by a footbridge. The station closed to passengers in 1952 and to goods traffic in 1959.

Preceding station	Historical railways	Following station
Crewe; Line and station open	London and North Western Railway; North Wales Coast Line	Calveley; Line open, station closed
