= Listed buildings in Stoke, Cheshire East =

Stoke is a former civil parish in Cheshire East, England. It contained six buildings recorded in the National Heritage List for England as designated listed buildings, all listed at Grade II. This grade is the lowest of the three grades given to listed buildings It is applied to "buildings of national importance and special interest". The Shropshire Union Canal passes through the village and joins its Middlewich Branch in the parish. One bridge on the canal, and one on its branch are listed. Otherwise the parish was mainly rural, the other listed buildings consisting of a house with an associated dovecote, a former post office, and a cottage.

Name and location	Photograph	Date	Notes
Stoke Hall; 53.10630°N 2.56487°W	—	17th century	A large house dating mainly from the 19th century, built in brick with a slate roof. It has an L-shaped plan, with a wing facing the garden in three storeys and five bays, and an entrance wing in two storeys and eight bays. Most of the windows are sashes, and the doorways are flanked by pilasters. Other features include a blocked oculus and dentilled eaves.
Old Post Office; 53.10515°N 2.57498°W		Late 17th century	Originally the village post office, it has been altered and converted into a cottage. The cottage is built in rendered brick with a slate roof (formerly thatched), it is in two storeys, and has a two-bay front. The upper storey at the front is weatherboarded, and the windows are casements. Attached to the cottage are single-storey lean-to additions.
Stoke Cottage; 53.10458°N 2.57878°W		18th century	There was a large extension to the rear of the cottage in 1856. The cottage is built in brick with a slate roof, and is in two storeys with a front of three bays. The rear wing, which is also in three bays, gives the whole building an L-shaped plan. The porch on the front is flanked by ogee bow windows. These, and other windows on this front, are Gothick casement windows. Most windows elsewhere are sashes.
Dovecote, Stoke Hall; 53.10710°N 2.56487°W	—	Late 18th century	The dovecote has a square plan, and is built in brick with a hipped slate roof. It contains doorways and a window, and in the upper part are vertical elliptical openings. On the roof are the remains of a wooden bell turret with a lead roof and a wooden finial.
Bremilows Bridge; 53.10879°N 2.57950°W		c. 1779	A road bridge, this is bridge No. 100 over the Shropshire Union Canal. It was designed by Thomas Telford, and is built in brick with stone copings and parapets. The bridge consists of a single segmental arch, and has a humped carriageway.
Sandhole Bridge; 53.11111°N 2.56562°W		1827–33	An accommodation bridge, this is bridge No. 3 over the Middlewich Branch of the Shropshire Union Canal. It was designed by Thomas Telford, and is built in brick with a stone band and copings. The bridge consists of a single arch with solid parapets and piers.

== See also ==
- Listed buildings in Haughton
- Listed buildings in Hurleston
- Listed buildings in Poole
- Listed buildings in Wardle
