= Stoke Hall, Cheshire =

Stoke Hall
- Interactive map of the Stoke Hall area

General information
- Type: Mansion
- Location: Stoke Hall Lane, Stoke, Cheshire, England
- Coordinates: 53.1062°N 2.5649°W

Design and construction
- Designations: Grade II listed

Stoke Hall is a Grade II listed mansion on Stoke Hall Lane in the civil parish of Stoke in Cheshire East, England. The large L-shaped building dates originally from the early 17th century, but has a 19th-century appearance. It is built from red brick, in Flemish bond, with a slate roof.

The hall originally belonged to the Minshull family, who owned the manor of Stoke in the 17th century. A disused dovecote with a bell turret in the grounds of the hall dates from the late 18th century; it is also listed at grade II.

The building was Grade II listed on 10 June 1952. The hall gives its name to the lane from which it is accessed.

== See also ==
- Listed buildings in Stoke, Cheshire East
