= Bunbury Mill =

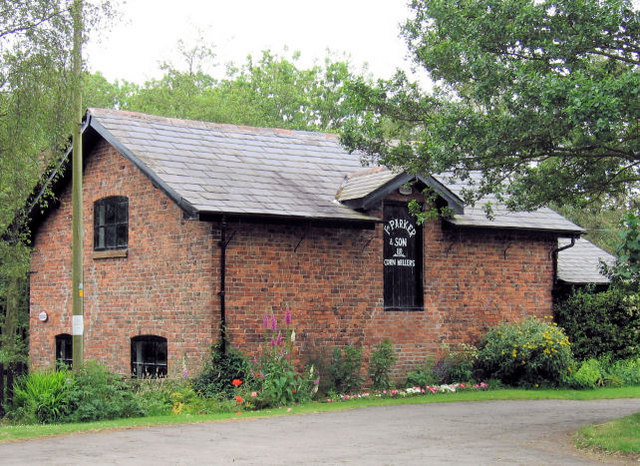
- Bunbury Mill from the southwest

- Location in Cheshire
- 53°07′05″N 2°38′22″W
- Location: Bunbury
- OS grid reference: SJ 573 581

History
- Built: 1844

Site notes
- Area: Cheshire
- Governing body: Bunbury Watermill Trust

Listed Building – Grade II
- Official name: Bunbury Mill
- Designated: 15 February 1982
- Reference no.: 1138624

Bunbury Mill is a watermill located to the east of the village of Bunbury, Cheshire, England. After being at risk of demolition, it has been restored as a working museum. The structure is designated by Historic England as a Grade II listed building.

== History ==
There is evidence that a corn mill has been on the site since 1290. The present building dates from about 1844, when an earlier mill was destroyed by fire. During the 20th century the mill was used mainly to produce animal feed, although some flour was still made. In 1960 the building was damaged by flood and, because of the cost of reconstruction and because of falling demand for its products, the mill closed. The land was bought by Nantwich Rural District Council as a site for a water treatment works. In 1966 there were plans to demolish the building, but local residents campaigned for the mill to be repaired as a job creation scheme. This was successful, and the mill was restored to working order by 1977. It passed into the ownership of the North West Water Authority (later part of United Utilities) who reopened the mill as a working museum. In 1999 United Utilities added a classroom and toilet facilities, and the building was used for school and heritage visitors. The mill was closed by United Utilities in 2010 for financial reasons, and the grounds and machinery were looked after by volunteers. The Bunbury Watermill Trust was established, and in April 2012 the mill was given to the Trust, reopening it to visitors. The group Friends of Bunbury Mill has been established to support the work of the trustees.

== Description ==
The mill stands on a sloping site with a single storey facing the road to the south, and two storeys behind. It is constructed in red brick with a slate roof. On the south face is an elevated taking-in door under a small gable. The west and east sides are gabled, with three windows in the west side. The north side contains an entrance door and other openings. The mill pool lies to the south and the mill stream runs to the east.

== Access and facilities ==
Bunbury Mill is open to visitors at advertised times. Tours of the working mill are available. The site includes the mill pond, a wildlife pool and 2 acres of grounds. Facilities include a picnic area and a visitor centre with a café and public toilets.

== See also ==
- Listed buildings in Bunbury, Cheshire
- List of museums in Cheshire
