= Listed buildings in Alpraham =

Alpraham is a former civil parish in Cheshire East, England. It contained twelve buildings that are recorded in the National Heritage List for England as designated listed buildings. Of these, one is listed at Grade II*, the second-highest grade, and the others are at Grade II. Apart from the village of Alpraham, the parish was rural, and most of the listed buildings are residential or related to farming. The Shropshire Union Canal runs through the villages, and five structures associated with this are listed, two bridges, a set of locks, a stable block, and a former lock-keeper's cottage.

== Key ==
Grade	Criteria
II*	Particularly important buildings of more than special interest
II	Buildings of national importance and special interest

== Buildings ==
Name and location	Photograph	Date	Notes	Grade
Hilbre Lodge and attached cottage 53.13698°N 2.62071°W	—	Early 17th century	Originally a single building, it has been divided into two dwellings and is in two storeys with an attic. The original building has two bays. An additional bay has been added to the west, with a north wing, giving the whole building an L-shaped plan. Most of the building is timber-framed, some of it roughcast, and in other places it is in brick painted to resemble timber-framing. The windows are casements.	II
The Cottage and attached cottage 53.13709°N 2.62132°W	—	Early 17th century	Originally a single building, it has been divided into two dwellings. The building is timber-framed with brick nogging and roughcast panels; it has a tiled roof. It is in two storeys and an attic, and has a two-bay front. The upper floor is jettied and gabled. The windows are casements.	II
Grove Cottage; 53.13340°N 2.63330°W	—	Late 17th century	The cottage is built in timber framing with wattle and daub that has been rendered and painted to resemble timber-framing. It has a thatched roof covered with metal sheeting. The cottage is in a single storey with an attic, and has a front of two bays, with an attached shippon to the west. The windows in the lower floor are casements, and in the upper floor is a gabled dormer with a bargeboard.	II
Hillcrest; 53.14660°N 2.62609°W	—	1729	A brick house on a sandstone plinth with a slate roof. It has an L-shaped plan, is in two storeys, and has a two-bay front. The windows are casements, and the door is approached up three stone steps.	II
Clays Farm Bridge; 53.12474°N 2.61360°W		c. 1790	An accommodation bridge over the Shropshire Union Canal providing access to Clays Farm. It is in brick with stone copings, and is steeply humped. There are wide curved parapets on both approaches. On the south side is a narrow tunnel used for storage.	II
Bunbury Bridge; 53.12708°N 2.63264°W		c. 1790	The bridge carries Bowe's Gate Road over the Shropshire Union Canal, the engineer in charge being Thomas Telford. It is built in brick with stone copings, and consists of a single skewed arch. It has a solid humped parapet, and is part of a scheduled monument.	II
Bunbury Locks; 53.12680°N 2.63211°W		c. 1790	A pair of staircase locks on the Shropshire Union Canal, the engineer in charge being Thomas Telford. The chambers are in brick and stone. The top and middle lock gates are in steel, and the bottom gates are wooden. The locks are crossed by two 20th-century footbridges. They also form part of a scheduled monument.	II*
Cottage, Bunbury Locks; 53.12677°N 2.63177°W		Mid-19th century	The lock-keeper's cottage is in brick with a slate roof. It is in two storeys, the upper storey being rendered, and has a symmetrical three-bay front. There is a central doorway flanked by single-storey canted bay windows. In the upper floor are three casement windows.	II
Stable block, Bunbury Locks; 53.12658°N 2.63202°W		Mid-19th century	The stables, later used as a boat building workshop, are in brick with a tiled roof. The building is in a single storey, and extends for 20 bays. There are seven doorways, each flanked by four-light windows. The building forms part of a scheduled monument.	II
Alpraham Hall; 53.13825°N 2.61565°W	—	c. 1860	A farmhouse in brick with a tiled roof. It has an L-shaped plan, is in two storeys, and has a four-bay front. Each bay has a steep gable with painted timber framing and finials. In the third bay is a projecting gabled porch. The windows are casements with hexagonal lozenge glazing, those in the upper floor being in dormers.	II
Farm buildings, Alpraham Hall; 53.13853°N 2.61548°W	—	c. 1860	The farm buildings are in brick with tiled roofs, and form an L-shaped plan. They are in two storeys, and each wing has a front of seven bays. Features include various entrances and windows, with circular pitch holes and dormers in the upper floor.	II
Hill Farmhouse; 53.14441°N 2.62136°W		c. 1860	A brick farmhouse with a tiled roof, it is in two storeys with an attic, and has a three-bay front, the first bay projecting forward. All the bays have timber-framed gables of differing sizes. In the centre bay is a timber-framed porch. The windows are casements with hexagonal lozenge glazing.	II

== See also ==
- Listed buildings in Calveley
- Listed buildings in Bunbury
- Listed buildings in Rushton
- Listed buildings in Tiverton
- Listed buildings in Tilstone Fearnall
