= Hurleston =

Former civil parish in Cheshire, England

Coordinates: 53.091°N 2.567°W

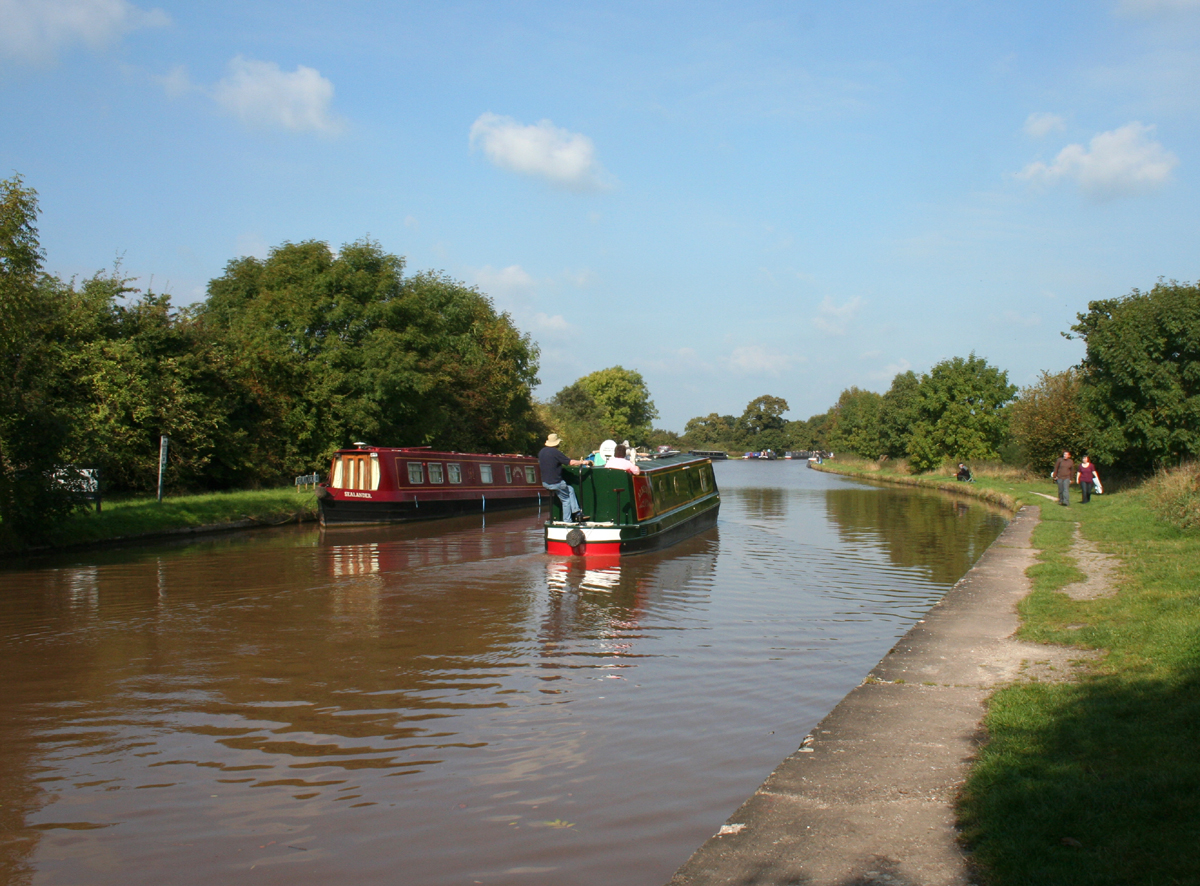
- The Shropshire Union Canal main line at Henhull Bridge near Hurleston

- Location within Cheshire
- Population: 75 (2021)
- OS grid reference: SJ620550
- Civil parish: Stoke and Hurleston
- Unitary authority: Cheshire East
- Ceremonial county: Cheshire
- Region: North West
- Country: England
- Sovereign state: United Kingdom
- Post town: NANTWICH
- Postcode district: CW5
- Dialling code: 01270
- Police: Cheshire
- Fire: Cheshire
- Ambulance: North West
- UK Parliament: Chester South and Eddisbury

Hurleston was a civil parish until April 2023, and now forms part of the civil parish of Stoke and Hurleston, situated to the north-west of Nantwich. It lies within the unitary authority area of Cheshire East and the ceremonial county of Cheshire, England. The area is predominantly rural with scattered farms and buildings and no settlements. Nearby villages include Barbridge, Burland, Radmore Green, Rease Heath and Stoke Bank.

According to the 2001 census, the parish had a population of 64. At the 2011 Census, the population remained under 100. Details are included in the civil parish of Stoke. In 2021 it was 75.

== Governance ==
From 1974 Hurleston fell within Crewe and Nantwich Borough Council, which was succeeded on 1 April 2009 by the unitary authority of Cheshire East. Since 2024 Hurleston has been within the parliamentary constituency of Chester South and Eddisbury, which is represented by Aphra Brandreth of the Conservative Party.

Hurleston was formerly a township in the parish of Acton. In 1866 it became a civil parish in its own right. On 1 April 2023 the parish was abolished and merged with Stoke to form "Stoke and Hurleston".

== Geography and transport ==
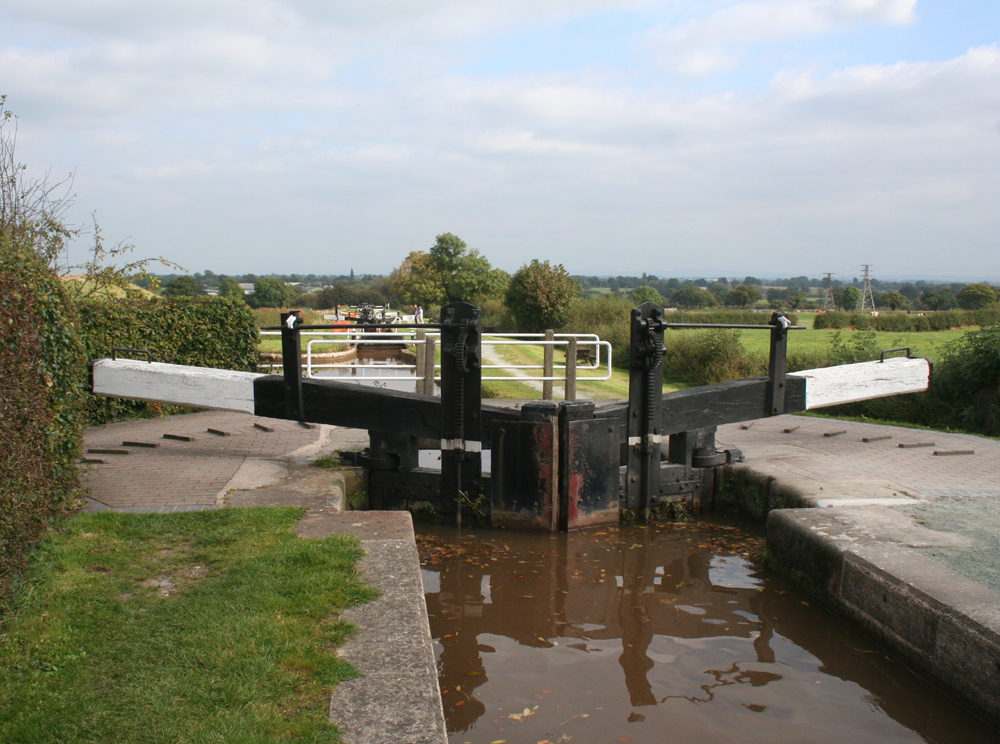
Hurleston Top Lock on the Llangollen Canal, looking east

The civil parish includes several small deciduous and mixed woodlands, including Bachehouse Covert, and also the mere of Bachehouse Pool and Hurleston Reservoir.

The Shropshire Union Canal splits into two branches at Hurleston Junction and both branches run through the parish. The main line runs north–south, while the Llangollen branch at first runs westwards, ascending 35 ft (10.7 m) via the four Hurleston Locks, and then turns southwards. The A51 runs north–south through the parish, crossing the Llangollen branch of the canal at Hurleston Bridge. The A534 forms part of the southern boundary of the civil parish.

== See also ==
- Listed buildings in Hurleston
- Snugburys, an ice cream manufacturer in Hurleston
