= Calveley =

Village in Cheshire, England

Coordinates: 53.125°N 2.612°W

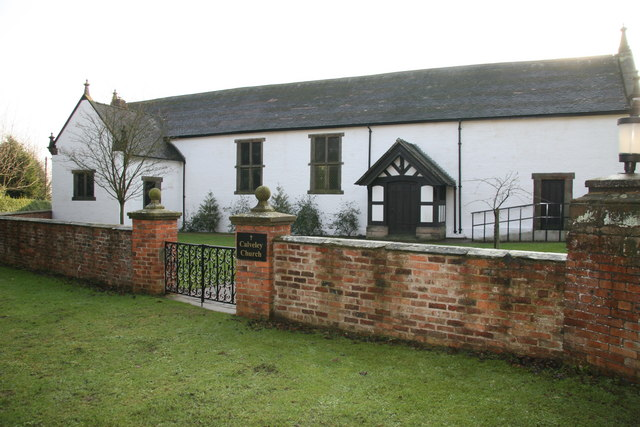
- Calveley Church

- Location within Cheshire
- Population: 280 (2011)
- OS grid reference: SJ591589
- Civil parish: Alpraham and Calveley
- Unitary authority: Cheshire East
- Ceremonial county: Cheshire
- Region: North West
- Country: England
- Sovereign state: United Kingdom
- Post town: TARPORLEY
- Postcode district: CW6
- Dialling code: 01829
- Police: Cheshire
- Fire: Cheshire
- Ambulance: North West
- UK Parliament: Chester South and Eddisbury

Calveley is a village and former civil parish, now in the parish of Alpraham and Calveley, in the unitary authority area of Cheshire East and the ceremonial county of Cheshire, England. The village lies 5½ miles to the north west of Nantwich. The parish also includes parts of the settlements of Barrets Green and Wardle Bank. The area is largely agricultural and includes a short stretch of the Shropshire Union Canal. There is an Anglican parish church, a primary school and a public house. Nearby villages include Alpraham, Bunbury, Haughton and Wardle. In 2011 the parish had a population of 280.

== History ==
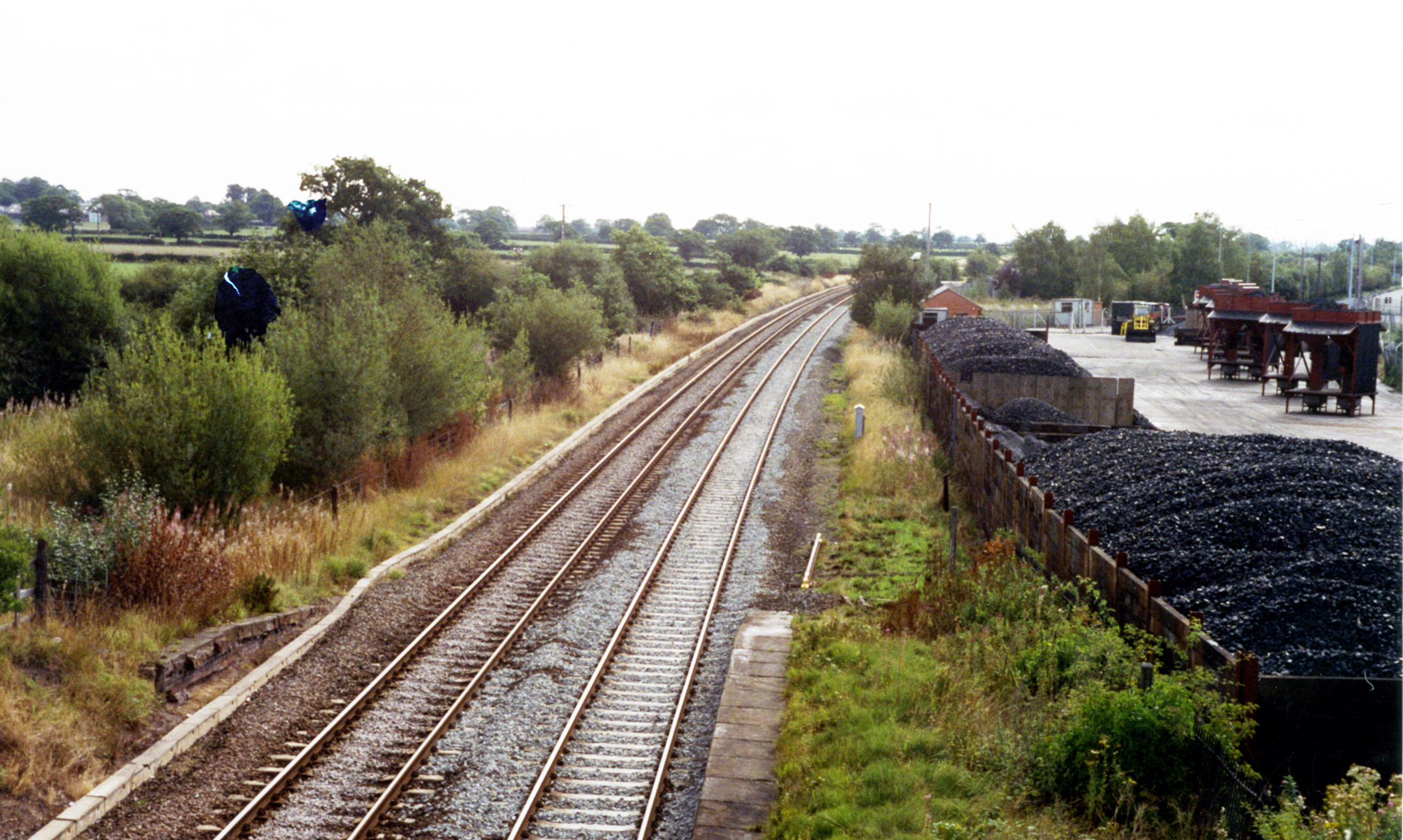
Former Calveley station in 1990

Watfield Pavement, a stone road believed to have originally formed part of a Roman road from Chester to Chesterton in Staffordshire, passed through the parish. Originally held by the de Calveleys, the manor passed by marriage to the Davenport family in 1369. Their seat was at Calveley Hall. John Wesley is supposed to have visited the hall in 1749. The original hall was demolished at the end of the 18th century, and its replacement was also demolished in 1952.

A railway station at the village opened between 1840 and 1842. It remained open for passenger use until 7 March 1960 and for goods until 2 November 1964. There was a canal wharf to transfer goods between the canal and the railway, and from 1928 a siding into the United Dairies milk depot.

Next to the station was a sizeable steam saw mill owned by Messrs Wright, Aldred & Son which manufactured bobbins and general wood 'turnery' until it was closed and the contents auctioned in 1884. Known as the "bobbin factory", the name stuck even when the works was later converted to a milk depot. A further auction of saw mill equipment, steam engine, and sawn timber in 1896 suggests that the mill had continued as a saw mill after the 1884 auction.

The milk depot at Calveley run by United Dairies was a major employer, and collected Cheshire milk from a wide area. The origins seems to be the Tilstone Bank Dairy owned by Mr F.T. Walley, who sold it to William Price of the Great Western and Metropolitan Dairies Company in 1916 (already part of United Dairies), and relocated the dairy to the former saw mill at Calveley in 1918, with Mr Walley assuming the role of district manager, with his son H.A. Walley as Calveley depot manager. The siding into the depot was laid in 1928, and capacity was progressively increased reaching 50,000 gallons a day which were sent by rail to the London, Scrubs Lane, depot. Any excess milk went to the creameries at Whitchurch or Ellesmere for cheese-making. The works was closed in October 1965 with the loss of 100 jobs, it was owned at the time by Unigate Creameries, who had taken it over the previous April.

== Governance ==
From 1974 Calveley was served by Crewe and Nantwich Borough Council, which was succeeded on 1 April 2009 by the unitary authority of Cheshire East. Since 2024 Calveley has been within the parliamentary constituency of Chester South and Eddisbury which is represented by Aphra Brandreth of the Conservative Party.

Formerly a township in the parish of Bunbury, from 1866 Calveley was a civil parish in its own right. On 1 April 2023 the parish was abolished and merged with Alpraham to form "Alpraham and Calveley".

== Geography and transport ==
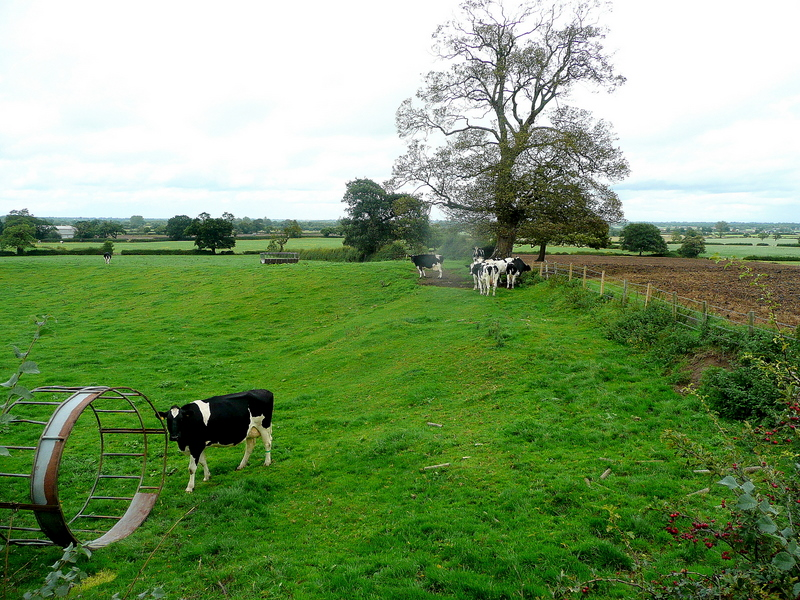
Dairy pasture near Fields Farm, close to the parish's high point

Most of the civil parish is agricultural, with Fox Covert, Old Covert, Ladyacre Wood and several smaller areas of woodland, as well as numerous scattered small meres and ponds. Ankersplatt Brook forms part of the north-western boundary; Bankside Brook runs in the north of the parish, also forming a short stretch of the north-eastern boundary; and a tributary of Crowton Brook forms part of the south-eastern boundary. The terrain slopes gently from a high point of around 65 metres at SJ60005952, near Fields Farm, to low points of around 40 metres in the north of the parish and of around 50 metres at the south-western boundary.

The Shropshire Union Canal and the A51 (Nantwich Road) run for a few hundred metres across the south-west corner of the civil parish, near Calveley village. The road and canal then run side by side along the parish's south-western boundary, with this stretch of the canal falling within the adjacent parish of Wardle. The Crewe–Chester railway follows a similar line, around 100–200 metres inside the parish boundary, and is crossed by an accommodation bridge at SJ60035823. There is a petrol station on the A51 near Tweedale Canal Bridge. Calveley Hall Lane runs from the A51 in Wardle via Wardle Bank to Long Lane, which forms part of the parish's north-western boundary, looping back to the A51 within the parish of Alpraham. Calveley Green Lane connects Calveley Hall Lane with Cholmondeston.

== Demography ==
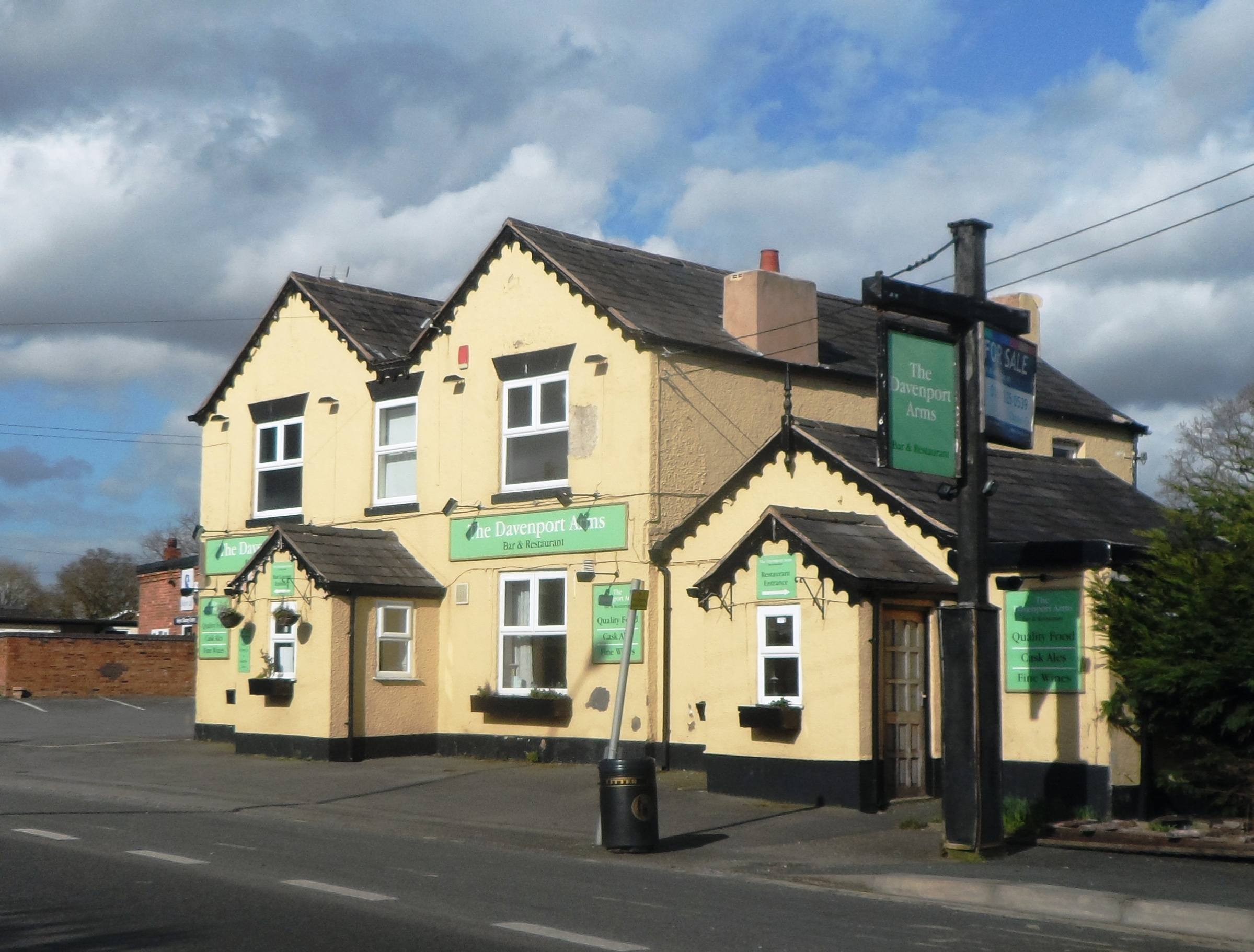
The Davenport Arms

According to the 2001 census, the parish had a population of 269, rising to 280 in 107 households in the 2011 census. This represents a decline from the 1901 population; the historical population figures are 144 (1801), 212 (1851), 312 (1901) and 202 (1951). The population density was 0.4 persons/hectare in 2011, well below the average of 3.2 persons/hectare for Cheshire East.

== Places of worship ==
Calveley Church on Calveley Hall Lane (at SJ6038459270) dates from the 17th century. Originally a barn, it became a coach house to Calveley Hall and, in around 1838, the hall's private chapel. When the hall was demolished, it became an Anglican parish church. It is listed at grade II, the lowest grade.

== Other landmarks ==
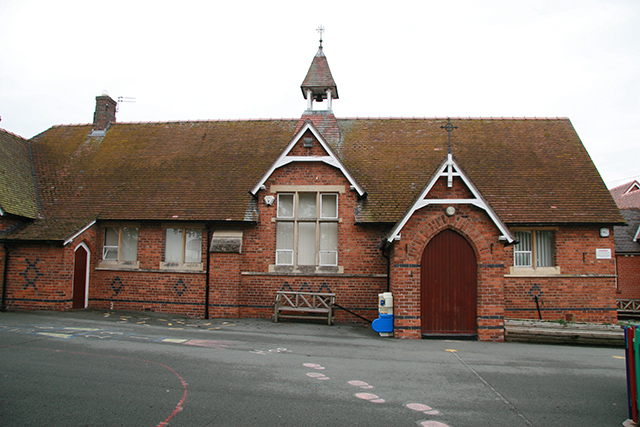
Calveley School

The Woodlands is a grade-II-listed red-brick farmhouse dating from the late 18th century. The mid-19th-century brick stables of Calveley Hall survive; they are also listed at grade II.

== Education ==
Calveley Primary Academy on Calveley Green Lane serves the civil parish, as well as the adjacent parishes of Alpraham, Cholmondeston, Stoke, Wardle and Wettenhall. Calveley falls within the catchment area of Tarporley High School in Tarporley for secondary education.

== See also ==
- Listed buildings in Calveley
- RAF Calveley, derelict former RAF airfield in the adjacent parish of Wardle
