= Beeston Castle and Tarporley railway station =

Disused railway station in Cheshire, England

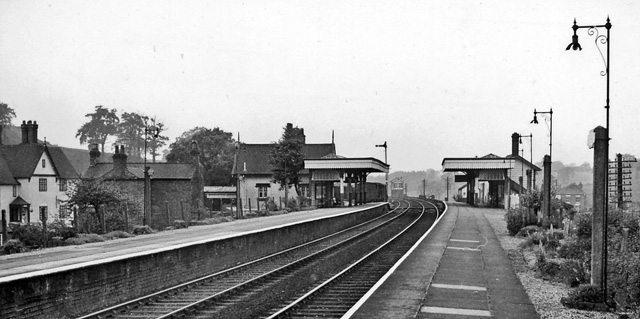
- The station in 1961

General information
- Location: Tiverton, Cheshire West and Chester; England
- Coordinates: 53.1331°N 2.6680°W
- Grid reference: SJ554597
- Platforms: 2

Other information
- Status: Disused

History
- Original company: Grand Junction Railway
- Pre-grouping: London and North Western Railway
- Post-grouping: London, Midland and Scottish Railway

Key dates
- 1840: Opened as Beeston
- 1868: Renamed Beeston Castle
- 1873: Renamed Beeston Castle and Tarporley
- 1966: Closed
Location

Beeston Castle and Tarporley railway station served the Cheshire villages of Tarporley, Tiverton and Beeston. It was originally a stop on the Crewe to Chester line of the Grand Junction Railway.

== History ==
The station opened on 1 October 1840 when it was simply known as Beeston but was renamed Beeston Castle on 1 October 1868, and again Beeston Castle and Tarporley in January 1873.

In 1880 the station was the site of an accident where the Dublin boat train reversed into the Birmingham train to Rhyl, and while several people were injured this was a very narrow escape from what could have been a major railway tragedy. Heavy rain had caused a stream running down from the direction of Beeston Castle to pool up on one side of the embankment further down the line toward Chester. A local coal merchant spotted that this had caused a sudden collapse of the embankment leaving a 20-foot (6.1 m) chasm where the embankment had been washed away leaving the rails and attached sleepers suspended over the gap. He succeeded in stopping the Dublin and London expresses "both within a few yards of the spot". After a temporary footbridge was made of sleepers the trains exchanged passengers and they were taken on to Crewe and Chester. The accident at the station was when the Irish Express backed into the Birmingham Express which had been held at the station.

The original goods siding was at the station, but at the end of the 19th century a new goods yard was opened on the west side of the A49 close to the livestock auction site. During 1940-1941 a Ministry of Defence hidden fuel depot was built to the south and west of this goods yard, connected by pipeline to Stanlow Oil Refinery and Avonmouth as part of the Government Pipelines and Storage System (GPSS). At Beeston there were provisions for loading rail tankers and road tankers if required.

The goods facilities were closed on 4 January 1966, the station was closed on 18 April 1966. Only parts of the platforms and the signal box still remain.

== Services ==
| Preceding station | Historical railways | Following station |
|---|---|---|
| Calveley; Line open, station closed | London and North Western Railway; North Wales Coast line | Tattenhall Road; Line open, station closed |

== Reopening ==
In early 2020 Michael Flynn a businessman who lived locally and was involved in the construction and operation of railways in the UK and around the world, frustrated at what he saw as the amateur and unserious nature of previous campaigns, formed the Beeston and Tarporley Station Reopening Group, with the object of preparing a professional proposal to reopen the station that stood a chance of actually being funded.

On 18 June 2020, the Beeston and Tarporley Station Reopening Group working closely with the local Member of Parliament Edward Timpson MP submitted a 55-page proposal to the Department for Transport seeking funding to develop a comprehensive business case for the project. On 25 November 2020, the DfT announced that the proposal had been successful and granted the group £50,000 towards developing a formal business case, along with DfT professional support to ensure that the next phase submission for funding to construct and commission the station would be robust and capable of approval.

In September 2021 Cheshire West & Chester Council was criticised in the House of Commons by the Secretary of State for Transport Grant Shapps for failing to contribute £5,000 to the costs of the Business Case but in May 2022 the Reopening Group submitted a Feasibility, and Preliminary Business Case to the Department of Transport for approval with a response expected in the Autumn of that year.

In October 2023, it was announced that the DfT had approved the station's reopening.
