= Wettenhall =

Village in Cheshire, England

Coordinates: 53.150°N 2.566°W

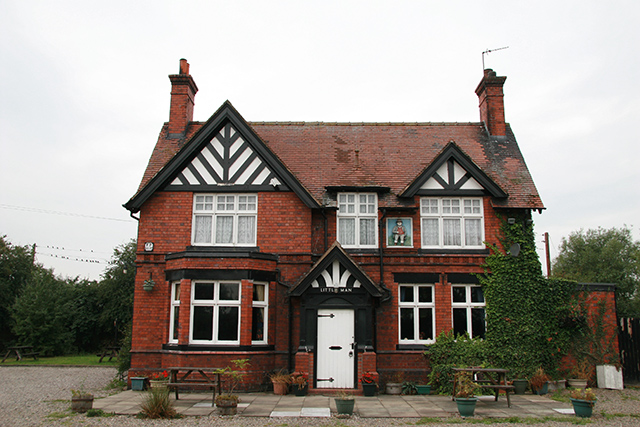
- The Little Man public house, Wettenhall

- Location within Cheshire
- Population: 192 (2011)
- OS grid reference: SJ621616
- Civil parish: Cholmondeston and Wettenhall
- Unitary authority: Cheshire East
- Ceremonial county: Cheshire
- Region: North West
- Country: England
- Sovereign state: United Kingdom
- Post town: WINSFORD
- Postcode district: CW7
- Dialling code: 01270 (Crewe), 01606 (Northwich/Winsford), 01829 (Tarporley)
- Police: Cheshire
- Fire: Cheshire
- Ambulance: North West
- UK Parliament: Chester South and Eddisbury

Wettenhall is a village (at SJ624614) and civil parish in the unitary authority of Cheshire East and the ceremonial county of Cheshire, England. The village lies 3½ miles to the south west of Winsford and 6 miles to the north west of Crewe. The parish also includes the settlements of Chapel Green and Woodside. Nearby villages include Alpraham, Calveley, Cholmondeston, Church Minshull, Little Budworth and Tarporley. According to the 2001 census, the parish had a population of 135, increasing to 192 at the 2011 Census.

== History ==
The village is listed in the Domesday Book as Watenhale and was held by Gilbert de Venables. In the Norman era, Wettenhall was within the Forests of Mara and Mondrem (now Delamere Forest) and in the mid-14th century was overseen by an underforester. The village's former manor house, Wettenhall Hall, dated from 1635 and was demolished in around 1930. A drawing by John Douglas reveals that it was a brick building in the Artisan Mannerist style, with three shaped gables.

The population has declined since the 19th century; the historical population figures are 228 (1801), 294 (1851), 214 (1901) and 154 (1951).

== Governance ==
Wettenhall is administered by Cholmondeston and Wettenhall Parish Council jointly with the adjacent civil parish of Cholmondeston. From 1974 the civil parish was served by Crewe and Nantwich Borough Council, which was succeeded on 1 April 2009 by the unitary authority of Cheshire East. Since 2024 Wettenhall has been within the parliamentary constituency of Chester South and Eddisbury which is represented by Aphra Brandreth.

== Landmarks ==
St David's, the village church, dates from around 1870 and was designed by J. Redford and J.A. Davenport; it holds services every Sunday. The Little Man is the only remaining public house; the Boot and Slipper was demolished in 2016.

== Geography ==
Wettenhall village is centred on the junction of Long Lane to Alpraham and Winsford Road between Darnhall and Cholmondeston. Wettenhall Brook flows through the village. The parish includes Wettenhall Wood, part of the Wettenhall And Darnhall Woods Site of Special Scientific Interest, together with woodland in the adjacent Darnhall parish.

== Education ==
There are no educational facilities in the civil parish. Wettenhall falls within the catchment areas of Calveley Primary Academy and Tarporley High School.
