= Forests of Mara and Mondrem =

Former forests in Cheshire, England

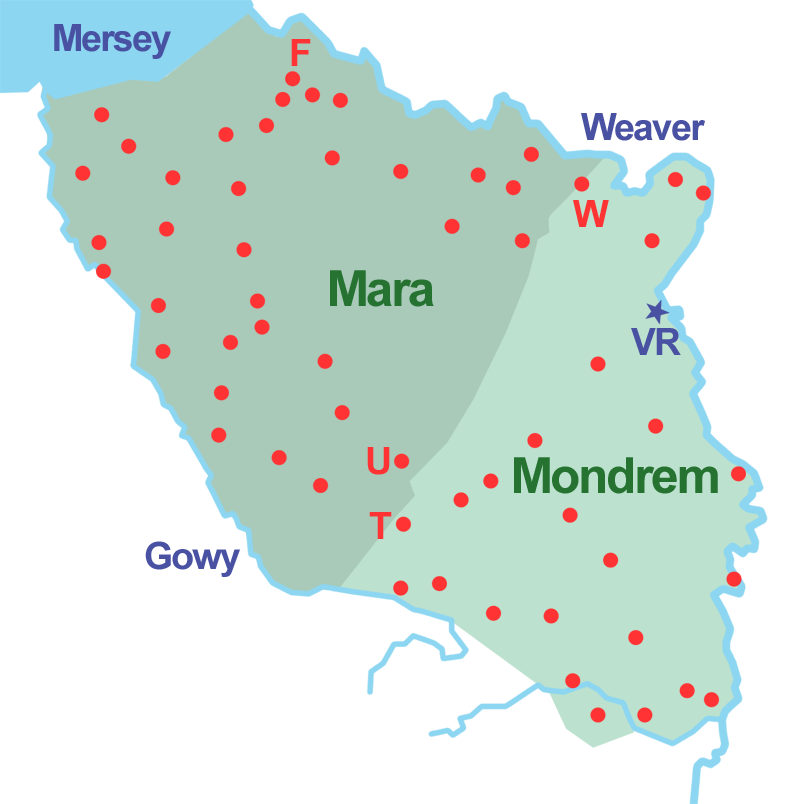
- The Forests of Mara and Mondrem (c. 1277–1536). Red dot: township within the forest; F: Frodsham; T: Tarporley; U: Utkinton; VR: Vale Royal Abbey; W: Weaverham

Geography
- Location: Cheshire, England
- Coordinates: 53°12′18″N 2°40′01″W

The Forests of Mara and Mondrem were adjacent medieval forests in Cheshire, England, which in the 11th century extended to over 60 square miles (160 km^{2}), stretching from the Mersey in the north almost to Nantwich in the south, and from the Gowy in the west to the Weaver in the east. Mara and Mondrem were a hunting forest of the Norman Earls of Chester, established soon after 1071 by the first earl, Hugh d'Avranches. They might earlier have been an Anglo-Saxon hunting forest. Game included wild boar, and red, fallow and roe deer.

After the earldom lapsed in 1237, the forest rights passed to the Crown, with the monarch's heir being given the title of Earl of Chester. Edward I and James I both hunted in the forests. Clearance for agricultural use began to be permitted after 1215, and by the mid-14th century, large areas of the Forest of Mondrem had been cleared. Deer hunting still continued within the remaining forest in the 17th century, and the forest was not formally disafforested, or removed from forest law, until 1812. The modern Delamere Forest is the remnant of the medieval forests, but little ancient woodland survives.

== Extent ==
In the 11th century, the Forests of Mara and Mondrem stretched from the Mersey in the north to a few miles north of Nantwich in the south, and from the Gowy in the west to the Weaver in the east. The total extent was over 60 square miles (160 km^{2}). An undated document quoted by Ormerod lists 62 townships and villages within the two forests (although several of these places were exempt from forest law); as the document mentions Vale Royal Abbey, this must refer to some time between the abbey's foundation in 1277 and its dissolution in 1536.

The precise boundary between the two adjacent forests is uncertain, but the Forest of Mara probably extended from the Mersey to the south of the area now known as Delamere Forest, while the Forest of Mondrem occupied the area between Delamere and Nantwich. The boundary might have coincided with a road known as "Peytevinisti" or "Peytefynsty", which also defined the limit of the grazing rights of Vale Royal Abbey; this is believed to have run from Weaverham in the north through Cuddington to Tarporley in the south.

== History ==
=== Earls' hunting forest ===
Coat of arms of Hugh d'Avranches

The Forests of Mara and Mondrem together formed one of the three hunting forests of the Earls of Chester, the others being the Forests of Macclesfield and Wirral. It was created by Hugh d'Avranches, a keen huntsman, soon after he became Earl of Chester in 1071, although the area might have been an Anglo-Saxon hunting forest before the Norman Conquest. "Forest", in this context, means an area outside the common law and subject to forest law; it does not imply that the area was entirely wooded, and the land remained largely in private ownership. The forest boundary was marked with "irremovable marks, meres and boundaries", and the entire area also appears to have been enclosed. Game was hunted with dogs and included wild boar, and red, fallow and roe deer.

The original woodland was mixed, predominantly oak, but also including elm, lime, yew, chestnut, fir, larch, beech, ash, silver birch, hazel, willow and alder. The forest area also encompassed heath and wetland, as well as pasture, arable land and even small settlements. Agriculture was, however, allowed within the forest boundaries only under severe restrictions; assarting, or enclosing and clearing new land for agriculture, was completely prohibited until 1215–16.

During the early Norman period, the penalties for killing game were blinding, mutilation or execution. These savage punishments were gradually replaced by huge fines, and in 1215, Magna Carta reduced the maximum penalty for breaking forest law nationally to fines or imprisonment. Ranulf de Blondeville, the 6th Earl, issued a charter in 1215–16 which granted a more humane legal code for the Cheshire hunting forests.

This charter also, for the first time, conceded to the barons and their knights and freeholders the "right to assart their lands within the arable area of the forest and to grow crops on land formerly cultivated and free from wood without payment." Within the Forests of Mara and Mondrem, custom did not, however, follow the charter, a fine of 5 shillings per acre in Mondrem or 6 shillings 8 pence per acre in Mara being paid at the time of enclosure. Later, a licence was also required to assart forest land, which required the payment of a further fee and was very unpopular. Enclosure and assarting in Mara and Mondrem during this period is poorly documented, but is known to have occurred at Frodsham, Weaverham and Darnhall.

=== After the Earls ===
After the lapse of the Chester earldom in 1237, the forest rights passed to the Crown and the monarch's heir was given the title of Earl of Chester. Although Edward I hunted in the forest, the sport became less important, and the forests were used for timber production and as a source of revenue from taxes, fees and fines. In 1300, Edward I confirmed Ranulf de Blondeville's charter of 1215–16, but in the mid-14th century, Edward of Woodstock, the Black Prince, introduced various restrictive measures, which led to a large number of complaints recorded in the Black Prince's Register of 1351. Agricultural exploitation of the eastern edge of the forest was hampered by outbreaks of Black Death at Over, Little Budworth and Vale Royal Abbey in 1349, 1361 and 1369. The Old Pale and Eddisbury Hill were enclosed in the 14th century, to retain deer.

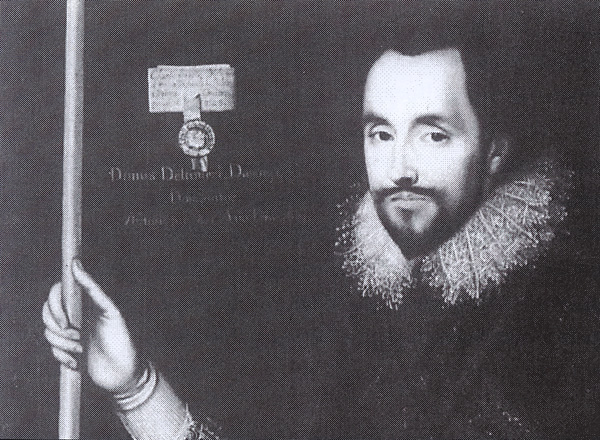
Sir John Done, Master-Forester, was knighted by James I after he hunted at the forest in 1617.

The northerly Forest of Mara remained wooded in the 14th century, and still retained a population of wild boar, lynx and wolves. By that date, however, large areas of the southerly Forest of Mondrem had been cleared. The remaining Mondrem woodland in the mid-14th century appears to have been concentrated in the north around Castle Northwich, Hartford and Winnington, and to a lesser extent in the south east around Aston juxta Mondrum, Calveley, Cholmondeston, Church Minshull, Poole and Wettenhall. Extensive assarting by Vale Royal Abbey made a major contribution to the loss of Mondrem woodland before the abbey's dissolution. The proximity to the medieval salt wiches of Nantwich and Middlewich, with their wood-fuelled salt pans, might also have been a factor.

Deer continued to be hunted in the 17th century; a large area at New Pale was enclosed at this time for the retention of deer. James I, on a royal visit to Cheshire in August 1617, hunted in the forest, describing it as "this delectable place". From the early 18th century, however, the focus of hunting moved away from deer; Tarporley Hunt Club was founded in 1762, and the local gentry hunted hares and later foxes.

=== Disafforestation ===
The late 18th and early 19th centuries saw much of the surviving forest enclosed. A total of 7,755 acres (3,138 ha) in the south of the Forest of Mara, by then known as Delamere Forest, remained nominally a hunting forest until the early 19th century. In 1812, an Enclosure Act was passed disafforesting the remaining forest (that is, returning its legal status to ordinary land) and transferring ownership of the remnant half to the Crown and half to surrounding major landowners. Very little ancient woodland now survives, mainly concentrated on the banks of the Weaver and within steep cloughs running into that river, although there are also pockets of old, semi-natural woodland elsewhere, such as Cocked Hat Covert, near Little Budworth, and Dorfold Park, near Acton.

== Administration ==
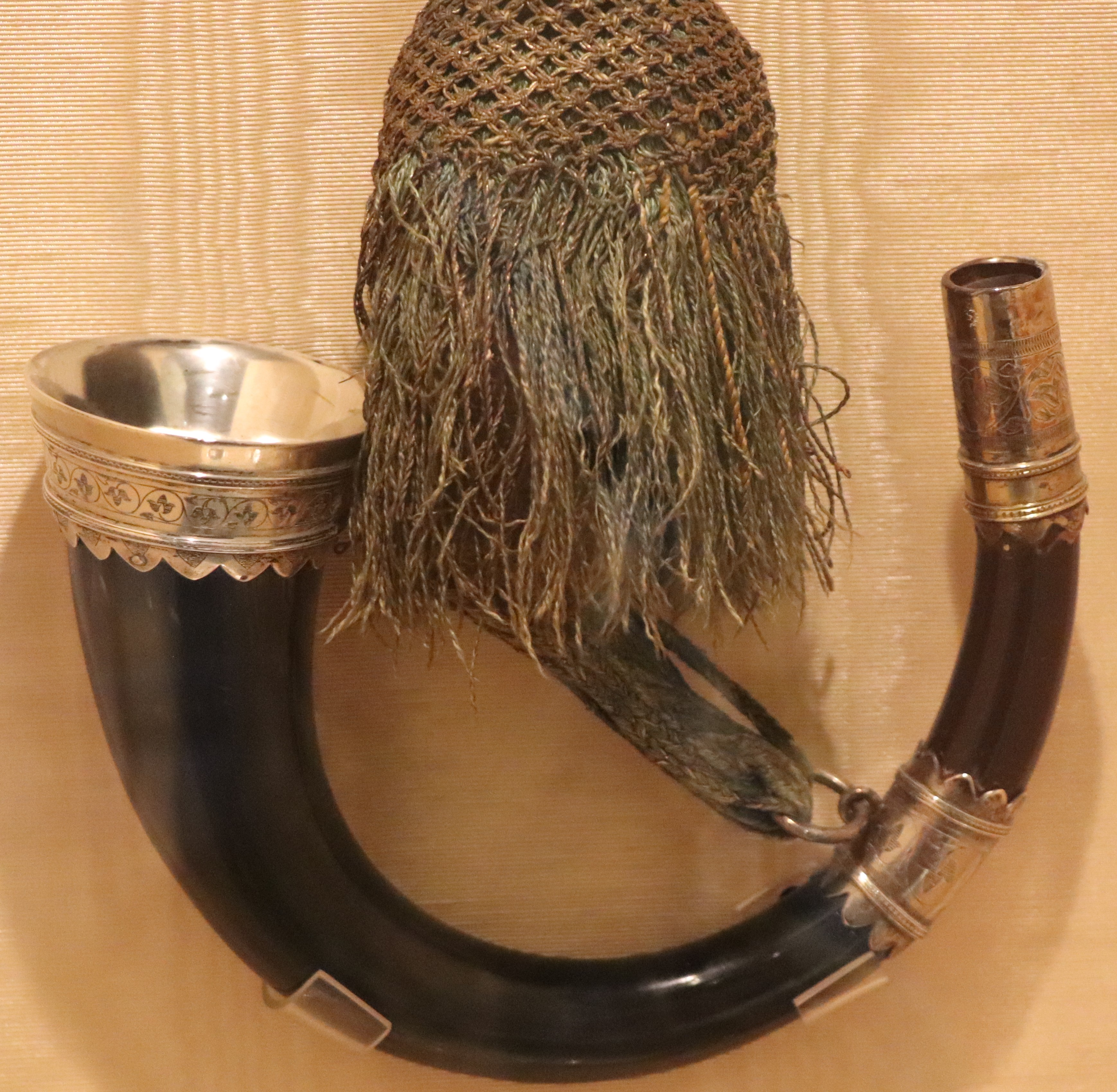
The Delamere Horn

Each of the Cheshire hunting forests was administered by a master-forester on behalf of the Earl. For the Forests of Mara and Mondrem, this hereditary position was given by Ranulf le Meschin, the 3rd Earl, to Ranulf or Ralph de Kingsley in 1123, and it passed by marriage to the Launcelyn family and later to the Done family of Utkinton and Tarporley. Sixteen Dones held the position over nearly four centuries. In 1662, the master-forestership passed to the Crewe family and then to the Ardernes, who held it until the disafforestation in 1812. The position was symbolised by a black horn, which was given to the Kingsleys in the 12th century; now known as the "Delamere Horn", it is in the collection of the Grosvenor Museum. The master-foresters answered to the Chester justiciar, who was responsible for the administration of forest law across all three Cheshire forests.

The privileges claimed by the Mara and Mondrem master-forester were set out in detail by Richard Done in the 14th century. They included the right shoulder of all deer killed in hunting; windfallen and felled timber within the demesne wood; swarms of bees, sparrowhawks, merlins and hobbies found throughout the forest; and the right of pannage, or feeding pigs in the forest. He also claimed halfpence per head of cattle and goats found straying within the forest between Michaelmas and Martinmas, the payments made for the agistment of hogs between Martinmas and Christmas, as well as the pick of the property forfeited by poachers. The master-forester had a lodge, known as the "Chamber of the Forest", in which he occasionally stayed; it was built in Peckforton in 1351 and later moved to Eddisbury Hill.

A large staff supported the Mara and Mondrem master-forester, which is known in the mid-14th century to have included eight underforesters and two garçons who administered particular districts of the forest, assuming much of the role of the county sergeants within the forest bounds. Additionally, agisters collected monies charged for grazing, verderers attended the forest courts, and inspectors termed "regarders", huntsmen and kennelmen were also employed.

== See also ==
- History of Cheshire
