= Listed buildings in Calveley =

Calveley is a former civil parish in Cheshire East, England. It contained three buildings that are recorded in the National Heritage List for England as designated listed buildings, all of which are at Grade II. This grade is the lowest of the three gradings given to listed buildings and is applied to "buildings of national importance and special interest". The parish was entirely rural, its listed buildings consisting of a church, a farmhouse, and the stables of a former hall.

Name and location	Photograph	Date	Notes
Calveley Church; 53.12908°N 2.59350°W		17th century	The building originated as a barn, then became the coach house to the nearby hall, and in about 1838 was converted into a chapel for the hall. The hall was demolished in 1952, and the church was incorporated into the parish of Bunbury. It is built in brick with a slate roof and has a rectangular plan, consisting of a nave and a chancel, with a timber-framed porch. The furnishings are Jacobean in style.
The Woodlands; 53.13124°N 2.58869°W	—	Late 18th century	A brick farmhouse with a slate roof. It has an F-shaped plan, is in three storeys, and has a front of five bays. Above the door is a fanlight and an open pediment. The windows are mullioned and transomed, and contain casements. There are bargeboards under the gables.
Stables, Calveley Hall; 53.12884°N 2.59337°W	—	Mid-19th century	The stables served the hall, now demolished. They are in brick with a slate roof. There are eleven stables, in two storeys. They contain half-heck doors, hoppers, and pitch holes. On the roof are the remains of three louvred ventilators.

== See also ==
- Listed buildings in Alpraham
- Listed buildings in Bunbury
- Listed buildings in Wardle
