= Rick Moore =

English cricketer

Personal information
- Full name: Richard Andrew Leigh Moore
- Born: 11 May 1989 (age 37); Crewe, Cheshire, England
- Batting: Right-handed
- Bowling: Right-arm medium

Domestic team information
- Years: Team
- 2009–2018: Cheshire
- 2012: Loughborough MCCU

Career statistics
Competition	First-class
Matches	2
Runs scored	76
Batting average	19.00
100s/50s	–/–
Top score	37
Balls bowled	78
Wickets	0
Bowling average	–
5 wickets in innings	–
10 wickets in match	–
Best bowling	–
Catches/stumpings	1/–
- Source: Cricinfo, 27 February 2019

Richard Andrew Leigh Moore (born 11 May 1989) is an English former first-class cricketer.

Moore was born at Crewe and was educated at Tarporley High School, before attending South Cheshire College. From there, he went up to Leeds Metropolitan University. While at Leeds, Moore played two first-class cricket matches for Leeds/Bradford MCCU in 2012, against Surrey at The Oval, and Yorkshire at Headingley. He scored 76 runs in these matches, with a high score of 37.

He debuted in minor counties cricket for Cheshire in the 2009 MCCA Knockout Trophy against Oxfordshire. To date, Moore has appeared for Cheshire in 42 Minor Counties Championship matches, 28 MCCA Knockout Trophy matches, and 14 matches in the minor counties 20-over competition.
