= Listed buildings in Bunbury, Cheshire =

Bunbury is a civil parish in Cheshire East, England. It contains 31 buildings that are recorded in the National Heritage List for England as designated listed buildings. Of these, one is listed at Grade I, the highest grade, one is listed at Grade II*, the middle grade, and the others are at Grade II. The parish contains the settlements of Bunbury, Bunbury Heath, and Lower Bunbury, with surrounding countryside. Many of the listed buildings are houses, cottages, farmhouses and farm buildings, some dating back to the 17th century and timber-framed. The other buildings are a church and associated structures, a public house, a former school, an active school, and a watermill.

== Key ==
Grade	Criteria
I	Buildings of exceptional interest, sometimes considered to be internationally important
II*	Particularly important buildings of more than special interest
II	Buildings of national importance and special interest

== Buildings ==
Name and location	Photograph	Date	Notes	Grade
St Boniface's Church; 53.1182°N 2.6453°W		1320	The church was built on the site of an earlier church, and it was endowed as a collegiate church in 1385–86. It was extended in the 16th and 18th centuries, and restored in 1863–66. The church was damaged by a land mine in 1940. It is constructed in sandstone, and is in Perpendicular style. Inside the church are fragments of wall paintings, a chapel screen with paintings dating from about 1420, a free-standing monument in the chancel to Sir Hugh Calveley who died in 1394, and in the north wall of the sanctuary a monument to Sir George Beeston who died in 1601 at the age of 102.	I
Gravestone, St Boniface's Church; 53.11824°N 2.64476°W		Early 16th century (probable)	The gravestone consists of two red sandstone slabs, joined and sloping from each other to give the appearance of a pitched roof. They are carved with a cross shaft on a base of three steps, and a very high cross tree. There is no visible inscription.	II
Chantry House; 53.11701°N 2.64638°W		1527	The chantry house is constructed in timber-framing with close studding on a sandstone plinth. The panels are plastered, and the roof is slated. The house is in two storeys, and has a front of three bays. The east front has a jettied gable. A south wing was added, and other alterations were made in the 1970s. Inside the house are four fireplaces with Tudor arches.	II*
Brook Farmhouse; 53.11994°N 2.63811°W		Early 17th century	The farmhouse is timber-framed with brick nogging on a stone plinth, and has a slate roof. It is in a single storey with an attic, and has a three-bay front. The windows are casements, those in the upper floor being in gabled dormers with bargeboards. A later south wing gives the building a T-shaped plan.	II
Brook Farm Cottage; 53.11998°N 2.63781°W	—	Early 17th century	The building originated as a barn, and was later converted into a cottage. It is timber-framed with brick nogging on a stone plinth, and has a slate roof. The cottage is in two storeys, and has a two-bay front. The windows are casements, those in the upper floor being in gabled dormers with bargeboards.	II
Bunbury Cottage and Tudor Cottage; 53.11571°N 2.65207°W		Early 17th century	Two timber-framed cottages with brick nogging on a sandstone plinth and thatched roofs. They are in a single storey with an attic, and have a three-bay front. The windows are casements; in the upper floor one is in a thatched half-dormer, and the others are in gables.	II
Bunbury Locks Cottage, Black and White Cottage, and Black and White House; 53.12702°N 2.63362°W		Early 17th century	A row of three cottages that are timber-framed with brick nogging and an asbestos-cement slate roof. They are in two storeys with an attic, and have a three-bay front. The left bay projects slightly forward, is gabled and forms a wing, giving the building a T-shaped plan. The windows are casements.	II
Tilstonebank Cottage; 53.12792°N 2.64625°W		Early 17th century	Originally three cottages, it has been converted into a single dwelling, and a wing has been added to the north. The building is timber-framed with plastered brick nogging and a tiled roof, and is in two storeys. The windows are mullioned and contain casements, those in the upper floor being in gabled dormers surmounted by finials.	II
Woodworth Green Farmhouse; 53.11361°N 2.63111°W		Early 17th century	The farmhouse is built in brick on a sandstone plinth and has a slate roof. It is in two storeys, it has an F-shaped plan, and there are entrance and garden fronts each of two bays. The windows are casements. Inside is an 18th-century staircase decorated with marquetry, which has been moved from another building.	II
Barn, Woodworth Green Farm; 53.11390°N 2.63115°W		Early 17th century	The barn is basically timber-framed on a sandstone plinth. It is clad and roofed in corrugated metal sheet. The barn has two storeys, and is in three bays.	II
Barn, Priestland; 53.12405°N 2.65980°W	—	Late 17th century	The barn is timber-framed and oak boarded, with a corrugated metal sheet roof. It stands on a sandstone plinth, and has a front of three bays. There are finials on the gable ends.	II
Chapel Cottage; 53.11449°N 2.65199°W		Late 17th century	The cottage is basically timber-framed, most of which has been encased or rebuilt in brick. It has a thatched roof, and is in a single storey with an attic. The cottage has a two-bay front, and a later extension to the rear. The windows are casements.	II
Church Bank Cottage; 53.11783°N 2.64595°W		Late 17th century	The cottage is timber-framed with plastered brick nogging on a sandstone plinth. It has tiled roof, and is in a single storey with an attic. A west wing was added in the 20th century.	II
Church Farmhouse; 53.11816°N 2.64641°W		Late 17th century	The original part of the farmhouse is the south wing. This is partly timber-framed with brick nogging, and partly in brick, and is in four bays. The windows are casements, those in the upper storey being in gabled dormers with finials. The north wing was added in the 19th century, it is in brick, and has a small hexagonal bay window. The whole building is in two storeys, with a tiled roof.	II
Little Orchard; 53.11871°N 2.64604°W		Late 17th century	A brick house with some timber-framing and a tiled roof. It is in two storeys with an attic, and has a two-bay front. There are extensions to the rear. Above the central doorway is an arched recess that rises up to the eaves; the arch and the eaves are dentilled. The windows are casements, and a dormer has been inserted in the roof. Inside the house is an inglenook.	II
Birchfield; 53.11819°N 2.64447°W		Early 18th century	A brick house on a stone plinth with a slate roof, it is in two storeys with an attic.. The house has a double-pile plan and a front of three bays, with a single-story extension to the east. The windows are mullioned and transomed, and contain casements. Above the door is an open pediment.	II
Dysart Arms public house 53.11849°N 2.64611°W		Early 18th century	The public house is built in brick on a sandstone plinth, and has a tiled roof. A 19th-century extension has given it a double-pile plan. The public house is in two storeys, with a two-bay front. The windows are mullioned, and contain three-light casements. In the centre of the entrance front is a gabled porch with a finial.	II
Oak Cottage; 53.12032°N 2.65922°W	—	Early 18th century	The cottage is timber-framed with brick nogging, some of which has been plastered, and stands on a sandstone plinth. It has a roof of asbestos-cement slate. The cottage is in two storeys, and has a front of two bays, with a 19th-century lean-to extension. The windows are casements, and the gables contain bargeboards.	II
Priestland; 53.12359°N 2.65943°W		Early 18th century	A brick farmhouse on a sandstone plinth with a slate roof, which was later altered and extended. It is in two storeys, and has a three-bay front. The windows are sashes, and the doorcase is flanked by fluted pilasters.	II
Rowton Cottage; 53.11100°N 2.65308°W	—	Early 18th century	The cottage is built in sandstone and has a slate roof. It has a double-pile plan, is in two storeys, and has a two-bay front. The gables contain sash windows; the other windows are casements.	II
Sundial; 53.11806°N 2.64520°W		1740	The sundial is in the churchyard of St Boniface's Church. It is constructed in red sandstone, and consists of a turned baluster-shape pillar on two square stone steps. The top projects and holds a calibrated bronze plate and pointer, and is inscribed with names and the date.	II
Brantwood; 53.11584°N 2.65164°W		18th century	The centrepiece is a bridewell around which was built a cottage in 1831. The bridewell forms the entrance hall, and is in sandstone. The rest of the cottage is in brick with a slate roof. It is in two storeys, and has a three-bay front. Most of the windows are casements.	II
North gates, St Boniface's Church; 53.11865°N 2.64513°W		18th century	A pair of gate piers and gates, which have been subsequently restored on three occasions. The piers are in sandstone with a square plan, and have moulded caps with ball finials. They are inscribed with names and the dates of the restorations. The gates are in timber and metal.	II
Bunbury Millhouse; 53.11837°N 2.64000°W		Early 19th century	This was originally the miller's house, later converted into a private house. It is constructed in brick with a slate roof, and is in two storeys. The front is in two bays, with an added west bay, and a later north wing, giving it a T-shaped plan. The door is approached up two steps, and the windows are mullioned and transomed.	II
Image House; 53.12221°N 2.66191°W	—	Early 19th century	A brick cottage on a stone plinth with a slate roof. It is in two storeys, and has a two-bay front, with lean-to extensions on the south and the west. The windows are casements, those in the upper floor being flanked by carved stone figures of small men in breeches and hats. The porch is carried on oak posts with stone capitals.	II
The Stores; 53.11632°N 2.65078°W		Early 19th century	This is a shop and a house built in brick with a slate roof. It has an L-shaped plan, the west front having two bays, and the south front three. At the corner of the building is the shop entrance; this has a fluted doorcase with a tympanum above. The tympanum leans outwards and contains the figure of a man wearing a kilt, holding a coil of rope and a long tobacco pipe.	II
Bunbury School; 53.11934°N 2.64663°W		1830	This was built as a school with an attached schoolmaster's house, and has since been converted into dwellings. It is constructed in chequered brick on a sandstone plinth, and has a slate roof. The building extends for five bays; it is mainly in a single storey, but the south bay, which was the master's house, has two storeys. The house is set at right angles to the school. Two of the bays of the school are gabled. The windows are mullioned and transomed, and contain casements.	II
Bunbury Mill; 53.11811°N 2.63951°W		c. 1850	A watermill built in brick with a slate roof, and a front of two bays. On the south face is a taking-in door under a small gable. The west and east sides are gabled, with three windows in the west side. The north side contains an entrance door and other openings. The mill pool lies to the south and the mill stream runs to the east.	II
Bunbury Aldersey School; 53.11719°N 2.65560°W		1874	Originally a grammar school, and later a primary school, it was designed by John Douglas. It is constructed in red brick on a sandstone plinth and has a slate roof. Its style is Tudor, it is in a single storey, and has a front of five bays. The entrance bay projects forwards and its entrance has a Tudor arch, above which is a gable with a finial. On the roof are lucarnes and an octagonal slate turret.	II
Church Cottages; 53.11876°N 2.64575°W		1874	A row of five brick cottages with blue tile roofs, built for the Peckforton estate. They are in two storeys, and each cottage has a front of two bays. At each end is a single-storey lean-to extension. The windows are casements. On the front are three gables with applied timber-framing and finials. Above the central door is a carved stone plaque.	II
West gates, St Boniface's Church; 53.11828°N 2.64588°W		1920	The gates and gate piers were erected as a war memorial. There are two tall piers with a pair of timber gates, flanked by a pair of lower piers with single gates. The piers are in sandstone, the taller ones surmounted by ogee cornices and ball finials. On the west fronts are plaques inscribed with names. The lower piers have caps with four-way tops. Between the taller piers is an overthrow carrying a hexagonal lantern.	II

== See also ==
- Listed buildings in Alpraham
- Listed buildings in Beeston
- Listed buildings in Calveley
- Listed buildings in Haughton
- Listed buildings in Peckforton
- Listed buildings in Spurstow
- Listed buildings in Tilstone Fearnall
- Listed buildings in Tiverton
- Listed buildings in Wardle
