= Listed buildings in Wardle, Cheshire =

Wardle is a civil parish in Cheshire East, England. It contains seven buildings that are recorded in the National Heritage List for England as designated listed buildings. Of these, one is listed at Grade II*, the middle of the three grades, and the others are at Grade II. In the parish is the junction of the Shropshire Union Canal and its Middlewich Branch, and three of the listed buildings are associated with this. The other listed buildings are farmhouses, farm buildings, and a pinfold.

== Key ==
Grade	Criteria
II*	Particularly important buildings of more than special interest
II	Buildings of national importance and special interest

== Buildings ==
Name and location	Photograph	Date	Notes	Grade
Wardle Old Hall; 53.10990°N 2.58133°W		Early 18th century	The former farmhouse is built in brick on a moulded stone plinth, and has a hipped slate roof. The house is in two storeys, and has a five-bay Baroque front. On the corners of the house, and flanking the central bay, are giant Doric pilasters with a triglyph. The stone doorway has a keystone, a frieze, and a pediment with a dentil cornice. At the rear is a two-storey, two-bay wing.	II*
Canal House; 53.10865°N 2.57904°W		Early 19th century	The house, later divided into two dwellings, has two storeys at the front and three at the rear. It is built in brick with a pyramidal slate roof. The west front is in two bays, and contains a canted bay window.	II
Wardle Pinfold; 53.11088°N 2.58426°W		Early 19th century	The pinfold was restored in 1981. It is in sandstone with a rounded coping. It contains a gateway on the west side with metal gates.	II
Rutter's Bridge; 53.11154°N 2.57360°W		1827–33	An accommodation bridge over the Middlewich Branch of the Shropshire Union Canal to a design by Thomas Telford. It is built in brick with stone dressings, and consists of a single arch.	II
Roving bridge 53.10879°N 2.57948°W		c. 1830	The roving bridge crosses the Middlewich Branch at its junction with the Shropshire Union Canal, and was probably designed by Thomas Telford. It is built in brick with stone dressings, and consists of a single humped elliptical arch. The north parapet has piers at the ends, and the south parapet curves to join the ground.	II
Wardle Bridge Farmhouse; 53.11354°N 2.58654°W	—	c. 1860	A brick farmhouse with a tiled roof, in two storeys, with a four-bay front. The outer bays project forward and are gabled. On the front is a gabled porch and a doorway with a fanlight. The windows are in cast iron and have lozenge glazing, those in the middle two bays being in gabled dormers. The gables contain applied timber-framing with plaster panels.	II
Farm buildings, Wardle Bridge Farm; 53.11389°N 2.58669°W	—	c. 1860	The farm buildings are in brick with a tiled roof. They have an F-shaped plan, are in two storeys, and have fronts of six and eight bays. In the upper storey are gabled half-dormers with applied timber-framing and finials. The buildings contain doorways, cast iron casement windows with lozenge glazing, and round pitch holes.	II

== See also ==
- Listed buildings in Bunbury
- Listed buildings in Calveley
- Listed buildings in Haughton
- Listed buildings in Stoke
