= Travellers Rest, Macon County, Georgia =

Unincorporated community in Georgia, U.S.

Coordinates: 32°16′52.57″N 84°1′43.67″W

Travellers Rest is an unincorporated community in Macon County, in the U.S. state of Georgia.

== History ==
Travellers Rest had its start in 1830 as a stagecoach stop. A post office called Travellers Rest was established in 1833, and remained in operation until 1852.

A variant name was "Bristol". An act of the Georgia General Assembly officially incorporated the place in 1838 as the "Town of Bristol". Today, Travellers Rest is classified as an unincorporated area.
