= Calveley Church =

Coordinates: 53.1291°N 2.5935°W

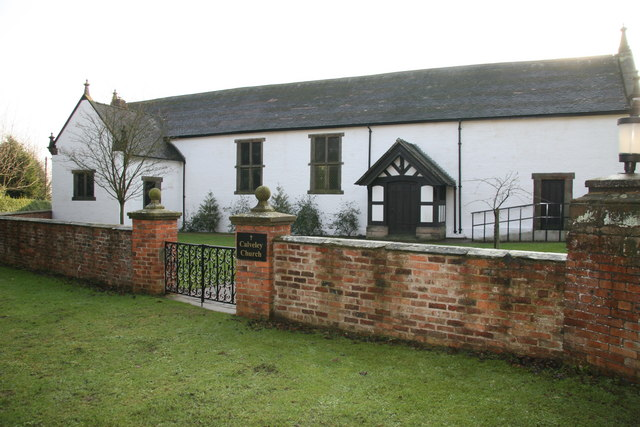
- Calveley Church from the north

- Location in Cheshire
- Location: Calveley, Cheshire
- Country: England
- Denomination: Anglican
- Website: Calveley Church

Architecture
- Functional status: Active
- Heritage designation: Grade II
- Designated: 6 July 1984

Specifications
- Materials: Brick, slate roofs

Administration
- Province: York
- Diocese: Chester
- Archdeaconry: Chester
- Deanery: Malpas
- Parish: Bunbury

Calveley Church is in the village of Calveley, Cheshire, England. It is an active Anglican church in the parish of St Boniface, Bunbury, the deanery of Malpas, the archdeaconry of Chester, and the diocese of Chester. The church is recorded in the National Heritage List for England as a designated Grade II listed building.

== History ==
The building originated in the 17th century as a barn. It then became the coach house for the nearly Calveley Hall. In turn, it was converted into a chapel for the hall in about 1838. In 1911 the church was enlarged by the de Knoop family, the owners of the hall, who added a vestry, and the interior of the church was renovated. During the First World War, the hall and church were used as a hospital for wounded soldiers. After the Second World War, the hall became uninhabited, its fabric deteriorated, and it was demolished in 1952. Money was raised, and the future of the church was secured for the local residents. It later became incorporated into the parish of Bunbury.

== Architecture ==
=== Exterior ===
The church is constructed in whitewashed brick with a slate roof. It has a rectangular plan, consisting of a three-bay nave and a single-bay chancel. An organ chamber and a porch project to the north. The porch is timber-framed, standing on a sandstone plinth, and has stained glass in the windows on each side. Over the entrance to the porch is an inscription reading "The Lord shall preserve thy going out and thy coming in". The windows contain stone mullions and transoms. On the gables are stone finials.

=== Interior ===
Inside the church, the furnishings are Jacobean in style, and date from the renovations of 1911. They include a five-arched screen standing between the nave and chancel; this carries an oak crucifix. Attached to the screen are the pulpit and, at the opposite end, the lectern. On the west wall are two late medieval panels from an altar, which depict scenes from the Nativity. There is also a brass to the memory of a member of the de Knoop family who died in 1916. The stained glass is by Powells. The two-manual organ was built in 1911 by Samuel Whitely.

== See also ==
- Listed buildings in Calveley
