= Travellers Rest, Alpraham =

Pub in Cheshire, England

Travellers Rest
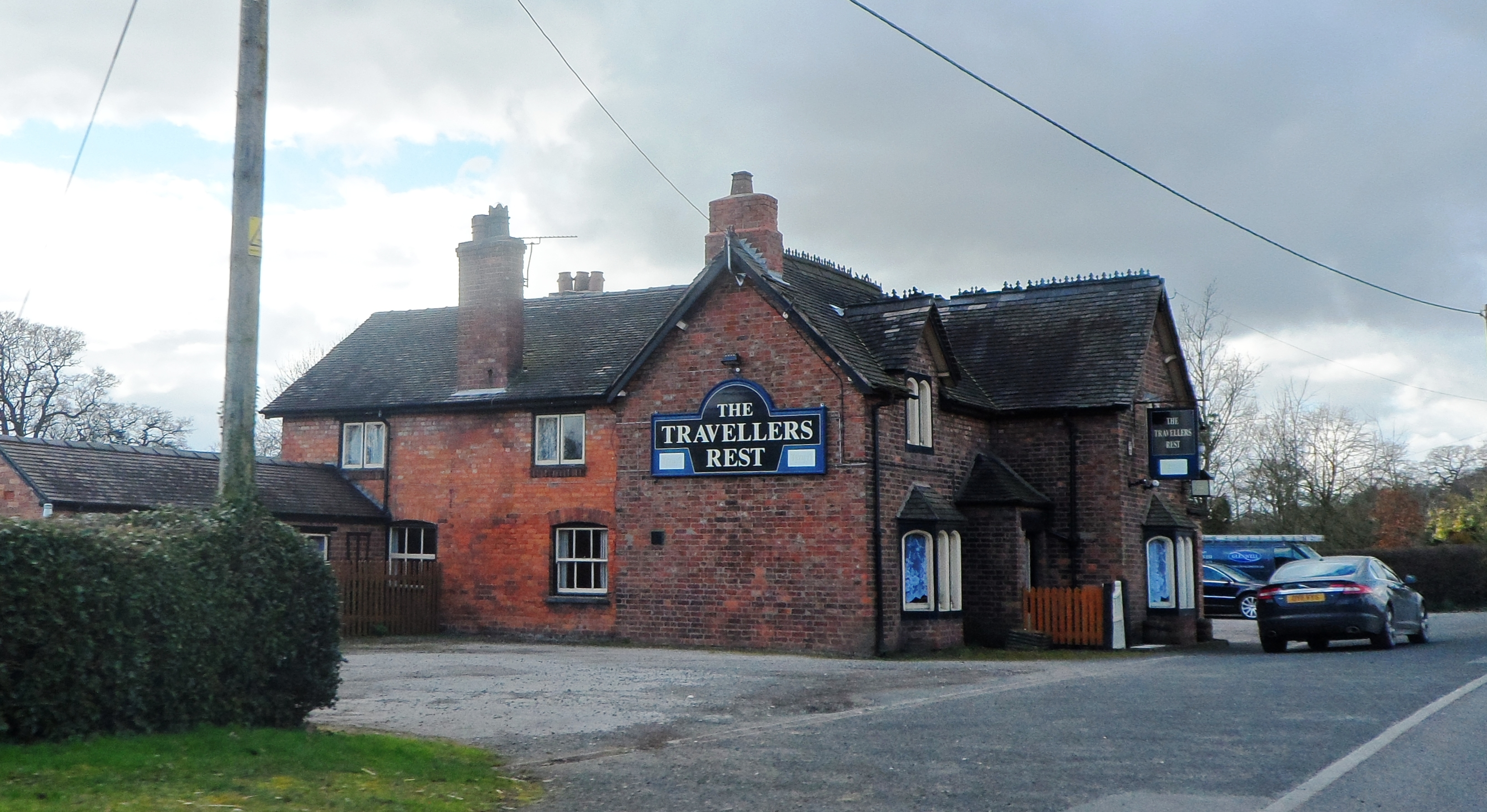
- The pub in 2014

General information
- Type: Public house
- Location: Chester Road, Alpraham, Cheshire, England
- Coordinates: 53.1344°N 2.6322°W
- Year built: c. 1850; 176 years ago
- Renovated: 1937 (extended) c. 1970 (altered)
- Owner: Independent

The Travellers Rest is a public house on Chester Road in Alpraham, a village near Tarporley in Cheshire, England. Originating as a mid-19th-century roadside inn, it has been in the ownership of the same family since 1900. The pub is included on the Campaign for Real Ale (CAMRA)'s National Inventory of Historic Pub Interiors, where it is rated three stars and its interior is described as being of "outstanding national historic importance".

== History ==
The public house originally consisted of a T-shaped structure dating from about 1850. It has remained in the same family's ownership since 1900 and was substantially enlarged, mainly to the rear, in 1937. A former First World War army hut at the rear served as a tea room from the late 1940s until 1989 and is now used occasionally for functions and darts events. Further alterations took place around 1970 with the introduction of the Wicker Room, also known as the Dart Room. A bowling green behind the pub remains a well-used feature.

The Travellers Rest was included on the Campaign for Real Ale (CAMRA)'s National Inventory of Historic Pub Interiors before the inventory's grading system was revised. Under the revised scheme, it is rated three stars and its interior is regarded as being "of outstanding national historic importance".

In 2023, a heavy goods vehicle collided with the front of the building, causing extensive damage, including the loss of the original sandstone mouldings to a bay window. The pub continued operating during the subsequent repair works from its rear rooms. In 2026, it received CAMRA's Phoenix Award in recognition of its recovery following the incident.

== Architecture ==
=== Exterior ===
The pub occupies a prominent roadside position on the A51 between Nantwich and Chester. It is centred on a brick-built, T-shaped structure with Tudor-style windows. Subsequent additions, chiefly to the rear, have enlarged the building while leaving its historic frontage largely intact. Ancillary structures include a timber building behind the pub, originally an army hut, and a bowling green that forms part of the wider site.

=== Interior ===
The interior retains a four-room layout comprising a tap room, a small public bar, a lounge bar and the Wicker Room (or Dart Room). Much of the surviving character of the pub dates from the 1937 extension, including the fittings in the public bar and lounge. The tap room, probably the principal drinking room before 1937, lacks a bar counter and retains a Victorian fireplace with tiled, cast-iron and timber surrounds, together with a 1930s Ind Coope & Allsopp mirror. The small public bar contains bar fittings installed in 1937, while alterations of around 1970 introduced decorative wall panelling and a replacement fireplace surround. The Wicker Room, brought into use as a public room around 1970, occupies a former domestic space and retains a serving hatch connecting it with the public bar, as well as a Victorian fireplace.
