= Alpraham =

Village in Cheshire, England

Coordinates: 53.131°N 2.621°W

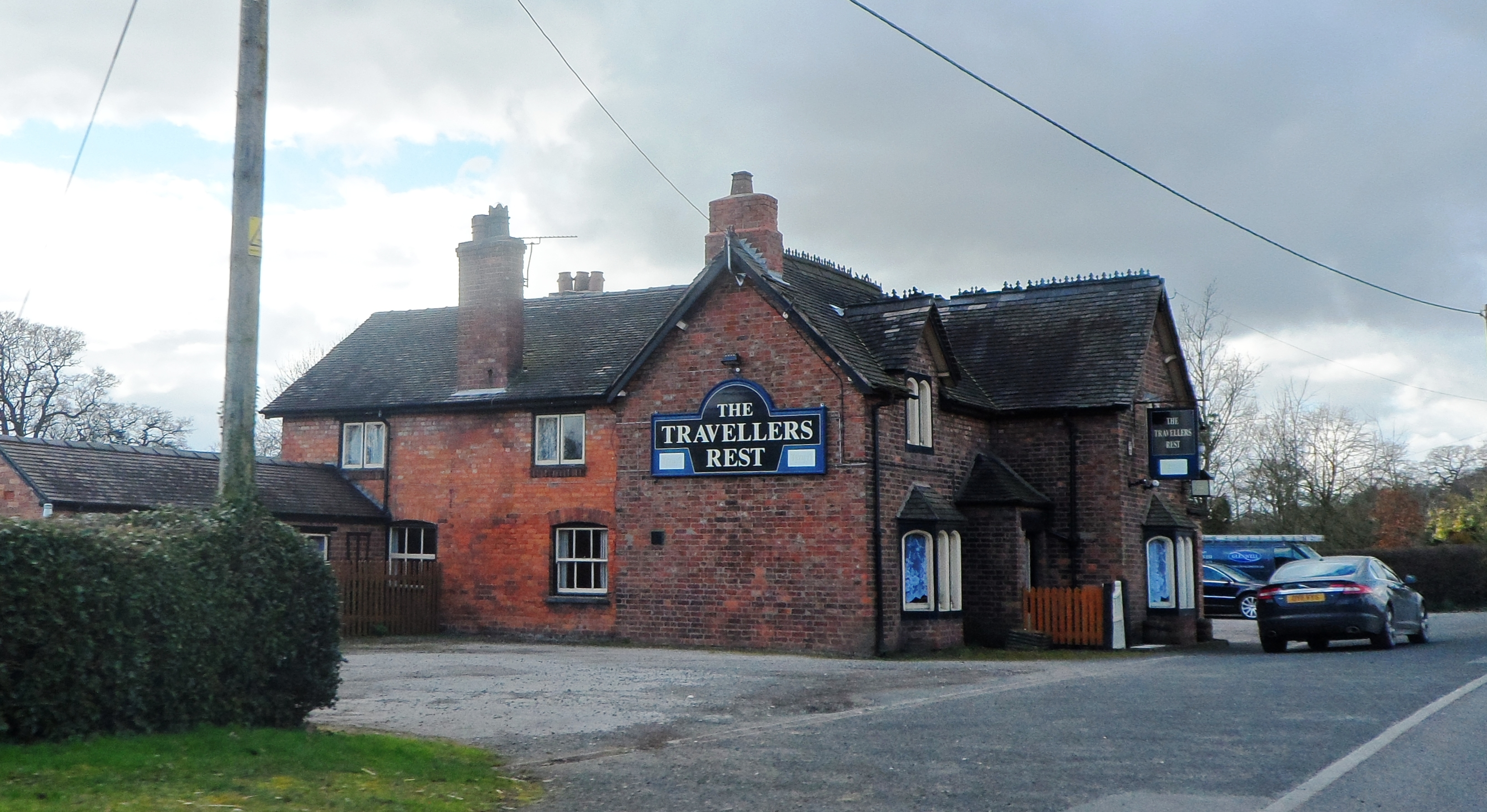
- The Travellers Rest

- Location within Cheshire
- Population: 407 (2011)
- OS grid reference: SJ584595
- Civil parish: Alpraham and Calveley
- Unitary authority: Cheshire East
- Ceremonial county: Cheshire
- Region: North West
- Country: England
- Sovereign state: United Kingdom
- Post town: TARPORLEY
- Postcode district: CW6
- Dialling code: 01829
- Police: Cheshire
- Fire: Cheshire
- Ambulance: North West
- UK Parliament: Chester South and Eddisbury

Alpraham is a village and former civil parish, now in the parish of Alpraham and Calveley, in the Cheshire East district, in the ceremonial county of Cheshire, England. It is on the A51 road between Nantwich and Chester, seven miles north-west of Nantwich. The population is around 400.

The Travellers Rest public house is on the Campaign for Real Ale's National Inventory of Historic Pub Interiors. It was built in about 1850 and extended in 1937, and the interwar interior remains largely unchanged.

== Demography ==
The 2001 census gave the parish's population as 373, rising to 407 in 162 households in the 2011 census. The population density was 0.6 persons/hectare in 2011, well below the average of 3.2 persons/hectare for Cheshire East.

== History ==
Robin Hood's Tump is a prehistoric bowl barrow on Vale Road west of the village. Excavations in the 1930s found worked flints, and pits and post-holes have been interpreted as evidence of pre-barrow occupation.

Alpraham was mentioned in the Domesday book as belonging to Edwin, Earl of Mercia, in 1066 and belonging to Gilbert de Venables in 1086 when it had 3 villagers and 6 smallholders. It had 4 ploughlands, 1 men's plough team, 2 acres of meadow and 2 leagues of woodland. In 1086 the value of the manor was just 8 shillings whereas in 1066 it had been 1 pound.

Alpraham was formerly a township in the parish of Bunbury; in 1866 it became a civil parish, but on 1 April 2023 the parish was abolished and merged with Calveley to form "Alpraham and Calveley".

== See also ==
- Listed buildings in Alpraham
