= Chester and Crewe Railway =

Chester and Crewe Railway Act 1837
- Act of Parliament
- Parliament of the United Kingdom
- Long title: An Act for making a Railway from the City of Chester to join "The Grand Junction Railway" near Crewe Hall in the County of Chester, to be called "The Chester and Crewe Railway."
- Citation: 7 Will. 4 & 1 Vict. c. lxiii

Dates
- Royal assent: 30 June 1837

Other legislation
- Repealed by: Chester and Crewe Railway Act 1840

Status: Repealed

Chester and Crewe Railway Act 1840
- Act of Parliament
- Parliament of the United Kingdom
- Long title: An Act for incorporating the Chester and Crewe Railway with the Grand Junction Railway, and for extending to the said first-mentioned Railway the Provisions of the several Acts of Parliament relating to the said last-mentioned Railway; and for other Purposes.
- Citation: 3 & 4 Vict. c. xlix

Dates
- Royal assent: 19 May 1840

Other legislation
- Repealed by: London and North Western Railway Act 1846

Status: Repealed

Text of statute as originally enacted

The Chester and Crewe Railway was an early British railway company, authorised in 1837 by the Chester and Crewe Railway Act 1837 (7 Will. 4 & 1 Vict. c. lxiii).

It was absorbed by the Grand Junction Railway in 1840 via the Chester and Crewe Railway Act 1840 (3 & 4 Vict. c. xlix). The company built the section Chester–Crewe of the North Wales Coast line, 21 miles (34 km) in length, the engineer was Robert Stephenson and the contractor for the work was Thomas Brassey. It was the absorption of this company that led the Grand Junction Railway to building its locomotive works at Crewe, which led to Crewe becoming a major railway town.
