= Tarporley High School =

Tarporley High School and Sixth Form College
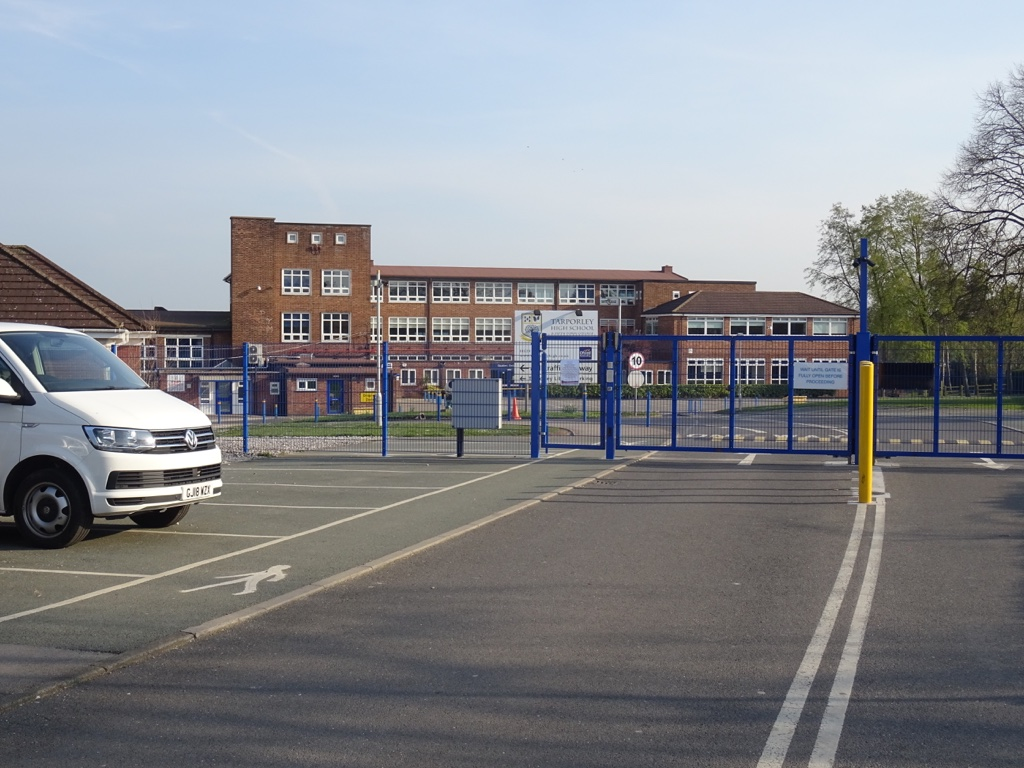
- The school seen from Eaton Road (2019)

Location
- Eaton Road; Tarporley, Cheshire, CW6 0BL; England; 53°09′13″N 2°39′55″W

Information
- Type: Academy
- Motto: "Aspire, Learn, Achieve."
- Established: 1958
- Department for Education URN: 138483 Tables
- Ofsted: Reports
- Headteacher: Jonathan Deakin
- Gender: Coeducational
- Age: 11 to 18
- Enrolment: 1200
- Colour: Blue
- Website: http://www.tarporleyhigh.co.uk

Tarporley High School and Sixth Form College is a coeducational secondary school and sixth form with academy status, located in the village of Tarporley, Cheshire, England.

== Admissions ==
It has around 1,500 pupils with 80 teachers. It is an over-subscribed school. It is situated in the south of Tarporley not far from the A49.

== History ==
The original school (C Block) was opened in January 1958 as the Tarporley County Secondary School, a secondary modern school with a three-form entry. Two more were also opened in Neston and Runcorn. By the early 1970s, there were around 400 boys and girls.

=== Comprehensive ===
It became a comprehensive school in 1974 with a seven-form entry. There was a major extension to the school in 1975 with the construction of D Block and the Library. The extension was needed because of its new status as a comprehensive – and changed its name to the Tarporley County High School.

In 2007 the school was designated a High Performing Specialist School (HPSS) by the Department for Children, Schools and Families putting it in the top 10% of schools nationally.

=== Academy ===
The school converted to academy status on 1 August 2012.

== Buildings ==
The school has a large sports hall which is also used by the local community; in addition, students have access to an artificial pitch and extensive playing fields. The school also has a separate drama building.

The school became a Specialist Maths & Computing College in 2003. As a part of this programme of investment extensive redevelopment of the existing buildings took place, focused particularly around the provision of the Maths and ICT curriculum. The school now has seven full ICT suites and a number of ICT hubs giving excellent access to computer resources for students. The existing 6th-form block was extended and refurbished during 2005, and again in 2011 to provide the best facilities for 6th formers in the Cheshire locality. With two dedicated 6th-form teaching spaces, a 6th-form study resource area and 6th-form Common Room.

In 2006 the school's library was fully refurbished after a sewage leak flooded the main several areas of the library. The library serves both the school and the local community.

In 2016 the school added a block of portable offices.

In the summer of 2018 D Block was refurbished.

Tarporley High School now benefits from a 9,900 square foot extension designed to support growing student numbers and modern learning needs.

The new building houses 12 classrooms, including two dedicated to advanced digital teaching, as well as accessible toilets, storage spaces, and a bright environment for both students and staff which is called F Block.

In October 2025, during the half term break, E block opened, opening new classrooms, with modern technology, for Maths and Modern Foreign Languages.

== Academic performance ==
In 1998 it received the best A-level results for comprehensives in the country, at a time when it had 800 boys and girls. It had the 8th-highest level of attainment at GCSE and A-level in Cheshire in 2007 according to The Times newspaper.

The school attained an average A-level point of 883.5 and 70 percent at GCSE in 2007.

In 2005 OfSTED inspectors judged the school to be good with some excellent features and to have improved since the previous inspection.

== Notable former pupils ==
- Ben Foden, rugby player
- Rick Moore (born 1989), First-Class Cricketer
- Tom Oliphant (Race Car Driver)
- Stuart Wood, Paralympian
