= Listed buildings in Tarporley =

Tarporley is a civil parish in Cheshire West and Chester, England. It contains 39 buildings that are recorded in the National Heritage List for England as designated listed buildings. It includes the large village of Tarporley; otherwise the parish is rural. Of the listed buildings, five are at Grade II*, the others are at Grade II. The Grade II* listed buildings are the church, a hotel in the village, the former market hall, a large house on the outskirts of the village, and a farmhouse just outside the village. Many of the listed buildings are in the village, and a high proportion of these are in its High Street. Outside the village, they are houses and associated buildings.

== Key ==
Grade	Criteria
Grade II*	Particularly important buildings of more than special interest.
Grade II	Buildings of national importance and special interest.

== Buildings ==
Name and location	Photograph	Date	Notes	Grade
St Helen's Church; 53.1580°N 2.6691°W		15th century	The oldest parts of the church are the two chapels. Since then there have been alterations on a number of occasions during the 18th, 19th and 20th centuries. In the 19th century J. S. Crowther carried out three restorations, and in 1931–32 a baptistry was added by Sir Percy Worthington. The church is constructed in sandstone with a slate roof, and has a southwest tower.	II*
Cross base and shaft, St Helen's Churchyard; 53.15787°N 2.66916°W		15th or 16th century	This is in sandstone and consists of a square base broaching to an octagonal body. It carries an octagonal moulded cross shaft, and is also a scheduled monument.	II
Manor House; 53.1576°N 2.6680°W		1585	A timber-framed hose with rendered panels and a slate roof. It has a main wing with two cross-wings, and is in two storeys. The upper floors of the cross-wings are jettied. The east gable has decorative timber framing, including beams with inscriptions and a coat of arms. At the rear are extensive 19th-century extensions.	II
Done Recreation Room; 53.1578°N 2.6696°W		1636	Initially built as a school in the churchyard, it is in red brick with blue diapering. It has an ashlar plinth and quoins, and a slate roof. The building is in two storeys, and carries two tablets, one with a coat of arms, and other with the date and an inscription. At the rear is a timber-framed gable.	II
Coach house, Salterswell House; 53.1631°N 2.6725°W		17th century	Additions were made in the 18th and 19th centuries. The building is partly timber-framed with brick nogging, and partly in brick, with a slate roof. It is in two storeys. On the entrance front are three carriage doors, a pedestrian door, and louvred windows.	II
Rooks Nest; 53.1527°N 2.6592°W		Early 18th century	A house in rendered sandstone with a thatched roof. It has two storeys and is in two bays. The house has a gabled porch, and dormers in the upper floor. Inside the house is an inglenook.	II
Rode Street House; 53.1653°N 2.6841°W		Early to mid-18th century	A farmhouse built in brick with stone dressings and a slate roof in two storeys and an attic. The front is in four bays. Flanking the two central bays are large pilasters with capitals, standing on plinths. At the top is a partial Doric entablature and a pediment. The windows are a mix of sashes and casements.	II*
Walls and gatepiers, Rode Street House; 53.16517°N 2.68409°W		Early to mid-18th century	The sandstone and brick walls enclose two sides of a rectangular garden. One wall faces the road, and has a central pair of gatepiers with ball finials; the other wall passes along the left side of the garden. On the corners are lower piers.	II
64 High Street; 53.1580°N 2.6683°W		Mid-18th century	A two-storey building in rendered and pebbledashed brick with stone dressings and a slate roof. To the right of the doorway is a shop window which turns the corner. To the left of the door, and in the upper storey, are sash windows.	II
Gate and gatepiers, Portal; 53.16469°N 2.65934°W	—	Mid-18th century	The wrought iron gate dates from the 18th century, and the sandstone gate piers are from about 1904.	II
Salter's Well; 53.16273°N 2.67164°W		Mid-18th century	The well stands by the side of Rode Street. It consists of a semicircular wall in red sandstone about 3 feet (0.9 m) high. The interior of the well has a ¾ semicircular shape, and is lined with brick.	II
77–85 High Street; 53.1588°N 2.6683°W		Mid- to late 18th century	A terrace of five three-storey houses in chequered brick with stone dressings and slate roofs. Shop fronts have been added to the ground floor, one of which is a canted bay window. The other windows are sashes. Some of the doorways have timber pediments.	II
Market Hall; 53.1589°N 2.6687°W		Mid- to late 18th century	The former market hall is constructed in brick with stone dressings and has a hipped slate roof. It is in two storeys with a main front of five bays, which were originally open. On the front are two arches and Tuscan columns, and there are more Tuscan columns inside the building. At the top of the building is a cornice and an open pediment. The upper storey contains five sash windows.	II*
Swan Hotel; 53.1588°N 2.6687°W		1769	A hotel built in brick with ashlar dressings and a slate roof. It is in three storeys and has a symmetrical entrance front of five bays, the central three of which are canted and contain Venetian windows.	II*
Salterswell House; 53.1630°N 2.6720°W		1785	A house built in brick with stone dressings and a slate roof. Two parallel two-storey gabled wings were added in the 19th century, occupying the full width of the rear. The house is in three storeys, with a symmetrical front of three bays. Six steps lead up to a central doorway with fluted pilasters to the sides, and an open pediment and a fanlight above. There are French windows on the right side, and sash windows elsewhere.	II
73 and 75 High Street; 53.1590°N 2.6683°W		Late 18th to early 19th century	A pair of three-storey houses, with shop fronts added later. They are constructed in brick with stone dressings and a slate roof, and have an entrance front of four bays. In the ground floor is a doorway with a bow window to the right and a shop window to the left. The middle floor contains a sash window flanked by oriel windows. At the top of the building is a pediment.	II
Birch Heath Farmhouse; 53.1517°N 2.6774°W		Late 18th to early 19th century	The farmhouse is constructed in brick with a slate roof. It is in two storeys, and has a symmetrical entrance front of five bays. This contains a gabled porch and sash windows.	II
Gable House; 53.1586°N 2.6682°W		Late 18th to early 19th century	A house in brick with a slate roof, in two storeys and an attic. The front has two bays, and is gabled. It contains two bow windows, and a pedimented doorway to the left. In the attic is a Venetian window, which is partly blank and painted to simulate glazing.	II
17–21 High Street; 53.1612°N 2.6690°W		Early 19th century	A terrace of three brick houses with slate roofs. They are in two storeys, with stone walling in the lower part of the ground floor. Along the ground floor are four casement windows, and in the upper floor some of the houses have horizontally sliding sash windows.	II
25–29 High Street; 53.1610°N 2.6690°W		Early 19th century	A terrace of three brick houses with slate roofs. They are in two storeys, with stone walling in the lower part of the ground floor. Along the ground floor are four casement windows. To the right is the entrance to an alley.	II
59 and 61 High Street; 53.1596°N 2.6686°W		Early 19th century	A pair of terrace brick houses with slate roofs. They are in two storeys and two bays. On the far left and the far right are doors with fluted pilasters, and a pediment. The windows are sashes.	II
32 High Street; 53.1602°N 2.6690°W		Early 19th century	This was originally two houses, later converted into a bank. Used by the Midland Bank, later the HSBC, now a hotel. It is constructed in stone and brick, and has a slate roof. The doors are flanked by panels and fluted pilasters, and have an open pediment above. The windows are sashes.	II
Rupt Cottage; 53.1650°N 2.6631°W	—	Early 19th century	Constructed in brick with a slate roof, the house is in two storeys. It has a symmetrical entrance front with a central doorway flanked by Tuscan pillars. Above the door is a fanlight and an open pediment. To the left of the door is a canted bow window; the other windows are sashes.	II
31–35 Forest Road; 53.1614°N 2.6687°W		Early to mid-19th century	This is row of three houses built in brick with slate roofs. They are in two storeys, and three bays. The door surrounds are moulded and have pediments. In both storeys are horizontally sliding sash windows.	II
Bowmere Cottage; 53.1540°N 2.6620°W	—	c. 1830	A house built in brick on a stone plinth with a slate roof. It has two storeys and an attic. To the right of the doorway is a French window, and to the left is a canted single-storey bow window. In the upper storey are casement windows.	II
31 High Street; 53.1609°N 2.6689°W		Mid-19th century	A two-storey house at the end of a terrace, constructed in brick with a slate roof. It has a symmetrical three-bay front with a central doorway. Above the doorway is an open pediment and a fanlight. Flanking the door in the ground floor are canted bay windows. In the upper storey above the door is a round-arched window, with sash windows on each side.	II
97 and 99 High Street; 53.1581°N 2.6679°W		Mid-19th century	A pair of terraced houses in brick on an ashlar plinth with a slate roof. They are in two storeys, and have a front of five bays.	II
Walls, railings and gate Salterswell House; 53.16286°N 2.67210°W		Mid-19th century	The wall and gatepiers are in red sandstone ashlar. The railings and gate are in cast iron, and are elaborately decorated with motifs including S-scrolls, flowers, and stars.	II
Milestone; 53.15939°N 2.66885°W		19th century	The milestone stands in High Street in the village of Tarporley. It is in ashlar stone with a rectangular base inscribed with the distances in miles to Tarvin, Nantwich, Chester, Woore, Stone, and London.	II
Old Fire Station; 53.15762°N 2.66738°W		1865	Built by the 11th Earl of Haddington to serve one of the earliest voluntary fire brigades in England, it is constructed in brick with a slate roof. At the front are two arched openings containing the original timber sliding doors. On the east side is a mount containing a cast iron bell. At the rear is a horizontally sliding sash window. It was later converted for use as the Fire Brigade Museum.	II
Hearse House; 53.15766°N 2.66729°W	—	1869	The former hearse house was built to replace an earlier hearse house nearer the church. It is constructed in brick with a slate roof and ridge tiles. It is in a single storey with a gable to the front, which is surmounted by a stone cross. The gable is rendered, and is decorated with timber framing. It contains a mullioned window and has a large bargeboard.	II
Corner Lodge; 53.16638°N 2.66033°W		c. 1870	The lodge is constructed in sandstone with a slate roof, and has an hexagonal plan. On each front is a gable with a decorated bargeboard. The windows are mullioned and transomed, and the door has a bronze lion-head doorknocker.	II
Gates and screens, Portal; 53.16540°N 2.66115°W	—	Late 19th century	These consist of a pair of carriage gates, with wicket gates on each side, and screens outside these. Each of the carriage gates has an overthrow. All are in wrought iron.	II
Portal; 53.1657°N 2.6603°W	—	1900–05	A large house in Vernacular Revival style designed by W. E. Tower. It is timber-framed with rendered infill, and has a stone slate roof. The house is in two storeys, with a single-storey stable wing to the left and a gabled wing on the right. The symmetrical garden front contains three large bay windows.	II*
Old Police Station; 53.1577°N 2.6676°W		1909	The former police station is constructed in red brick with sandstone dressings and a tiled roof. It is in two storeys, and has a main front of three bays containing mullioned windows. It closed as a police station in the 1980s, but its interior is little changed since it was built. The gate piers, gates, boundary wall, and railings are included in the listing.	II
War memorial 53.15827°N 2.66901°W		1921	The war memorial is in the churchyard of St Helen's Church, and was designed by Sir Percy Scott Worthington. It is in Portland stone, and consists of a lantern cross on an octagonal plinth with a two-stepped base. Within the lantern is a carved figure of Christ. The plinth has decorative details and an inscription. To the rear, and set into the churchyard wall is a slate plaque with a sandstone border. The plaque is inscribed and includes the names of those lost in the First World War, and below is another plaque with the names of those lost in the Second World War.	II
Lychgate, St Helen's Church; 53.15772°N 2.66873°W		Early 20th century	Located at the entrance to the churchyard, the lychgate consists of timber framing on a stone plinth with a stone slate roof. The tie beams carry inscriptions.	II
Telephone kiosk 53.15867°N 2.66830°W		1935	A K6 type telephone kiosk designed by Giles Gilbert Scott. It is constructed in cast iron and domed, and has three unperforated crowns in the top panels.	II
Rising Sun Public House; 53.1596°N 2.6690°W		Undated	Originally two houses, later converted into a public house. It is constructed in brick with stone dressings, stands on a stone plinth, and has a slate roof. In the ground floor are two shop windows, two casement windows, and two doorways, one of which is blocked. The upper storey has four windows.	II

== See also ==
- Listed buildings in Clotton Hoofield
- Listed buildings in Rushton
- Listed buildings in Tilstone Fearnall
- Listed buildings in Tiverton
- Listed buildings in Utkinton
