= Listed buildings in Rushton, Cheshire =

Rushton is a civil parish in Cheshire West and Chester, England. It contains 22 buildings that are recorded in the National Heritage List for England as designated listed buildings, all of which are listed at Grade II. This grade is the lowest of the three gradings given to listed buildings and is applied to "buildings of national importance and special interest". Other than the village of Eaton, and the settlement of Rushton, the parish is entirely rural, which is reflected in its listed buildings. Most of these are related to farming, or are domestic. The other structures include a smithy, a village cross, a ruined stone structure, a former watermill, and a well.

Name and location	Photograph	Date	Notes
Lower House Farmhouse; 53.1661°N 2.6343°W		16th or early 17th century	The farmhouse has been altered and amended. It is constructed in sandstone and brick and has a slate roof. The entrance front is in three bays with a pedimented door. The windows are casements.
Oak Tree Farmhouse, Edgewell Lane; 53.1649°N 2.6392°W		Late 16th or early 17th century	A timber-framed farmhouse with rendered infill and a roof that is partly thatched and partly slated. The building is in two storeys, with a 19th-century wing to the rear.
Village Cross; 53.16589°N 2.64017°W		16th or 17th century	This was restored in 1977. It is in red sandstone, and consists of a square stepped base supporting a square shaft surmounted by a cross.
Beech Lane Farmhouse; 53.1755°N 2.6374°W	—	Early 17th century	The farmhouse, which has been subsequently extended and altered, is constructed in brick with ashlar dressings and a slate roof. The original part has two storeys and is in three bays, standing on a projecting plinth and with corner quoins. There are later additions on both sides. Some of the windows are mullioned; the others are later casement windows.
Church Cottage; 53.1657°N 2.6402°W		Early 17th century	A timber-framed house with rendered infill and a thatched roof. It is in two storeys, and has a front facing the road of seven bays. The windows are casements, and there is a 19th-century wing to the rear.
Baytree House; 53.1653°N 2.6398°W		17th century	A house constructed partly in timber framing and partly in brick, with a roof that is partly thatched, and partly covered in corrugated asbestos. There have been three phases of building. The windows are casements. Inside the building is an inglenook fireplace.
Eaton Cottage; 53.1659°N 2.6425°W		17th century	This is a cottage in timber framing and brick with a thatched roof. There have been additions and alterations since it was first built. The entrance front has three bays, and there are gabled dormers in the upper storey. At the rear is a 20th-century gabled wing.
Hunters Close; 53.1660°N 2.6407°W		17th century	A timber-framed farmhouse with rendered infill and a thatched roof. It has two storeys, and the windows are casements. Inside the building is an inglenook fireplace.
Oak Tree Farmhouse, Oulton Lowe; 53.1629°N 2.6030°W	—	17th century	A timber-framed farmhouse with rendered infill and a thatched roof covered by corrugated iron. Its windows include casements and a first floor canted oriel window. At the rear is a 20th-century canted bay.
Parkwall Cottage; 53.1747°N 2.6242°W	—	17th century	A timber-framed cottage with rendered infill and a thatched roof standing on a stone plinth. To the left of a 20th-century gabled porch is a casement window, above which is a gabled half-dormer.
Flaxyards Farmhouse; 53.1578°N 2.6506°W	—	1665	There have been later additions and alterations. The farmhouse is built in brick and sandstone with a slate roof. It is in two storeys with an attic, and has an entrance front of four bays. The lateral two bays are gabled, and there are projecting gabled wings at the rear. Most of the windows are casements.
The Green; 53.1658°N 2.6404°W		Late 17th century	This house is built partly in timber framing with brick infill, and partly in rendered brick. It has a slate roof, is in two storeys, and has a front of two bays. The windows are casements. There are later additions to each side of the house.
Well House Farmhouse; 53.1647°N 2.6389°W		Late 17th century	A timber-framed farmhouse with rendered infill in two storeys. The windows in the lower storey are casements, and in the upper floor are dormers. Inside the building is an inglenook.
Park Gates Farm Cottages; 53.1725°N 2.6230°W	—	17th or early 18th century	A pair of timber-framed farm cottages with rendered infill and tiled roofs. It is in a single storey with attics. The ground floor windows are casements, and in the attics are gabled dormers.
Silver Birches; 53.1660°N 2.6397°W		Early 18th century	The house is constructed in whitewashed brick with a thatched roof. It is in two storeys with a gabled porch. The windows include horizontally sliding sashes, a casement window, and a gabled dormer. There are 19th-century extensions to the rear.
Old School House; 53.1663°N 2.6402°W		Mid to late 18th century	Now a house, constructed in brick with stone dressings and a slate roof. It is in two storeys. The wooden doorcase has fluted pilasters and an open pediment. In the pediment is an open book painted with a motto. The windows are sashes.
Oulton Mill; 53.1813°N 2.6296°W	—	1781	A former watermill constructed in brick with a slate roof. The front facing the road is in two storeys, and to the rear are four storeys. Facing the road is a central loading bay, over which is a loading stage and a gabled winch-cover. No mill machinery has survived inside the building.
Village Well; 53.16616°N 2.63923°W		c. 1800	This consists of a sandstone chamber set in a wall. There is a flat stab at the entry, and a door has been inserted for protection.
Eaton House; 53.1660°N 2.6379°W		c. 1840	This originated as a farmhouse. It is constructed in brick with ashlar dressings and a tiled roof standing on a rendered plinth. It is in two storeys and an attic with a symmetrical entrance front of three bays and a central two-storey porch. On the left side is a symmetrical three-bay wing with gables. The windows are casements.
Park House; 53.1720°N 2.6235°W	—	1841	A brick farmhouse with ashlar dressings and a tiled roof standing on a rendered plinth. It is in two storeys and an attic with a symmetrical entrance front of three bays. This has with a pediment carved with the Egerton family arms. On the right side is a symmetrical three-bay wing with gables. The windows are casements.
Monk's Well; 53.16345°N 2.65512°W		19th century	This a stone structure on the north side of a former quarry. It consists of a ruined wall, an archway and a cross. In its north wall is a cell carved into the rock, with a doorway over which is a lintel. The cross is inscribed with St Crispin and a date in Roman numerals.
Eaton Smithy; 53.1662°N 2.6395°W		c. 1850	The smithy is constructed in sandstone with a hipped slate roof. It has an almost square plan, and consists of a single room.. Inside it contains the usual smithy fittings, including an open hearth, an anvil, and a bench.

== See also ==
- Listed buildings in Alpraham
- Listed buildings in Clotton Hoofield
- Listed buildings in Little Budworth
- Listed buildings in Tiverton
- Listed buildings in Tilstone Fearnall
- Listed buildings in Utkinton
