= Eaton, Rushton =

Village in Cheshire, England

Coordinates: 53.166°N 2.639°W

Eaton
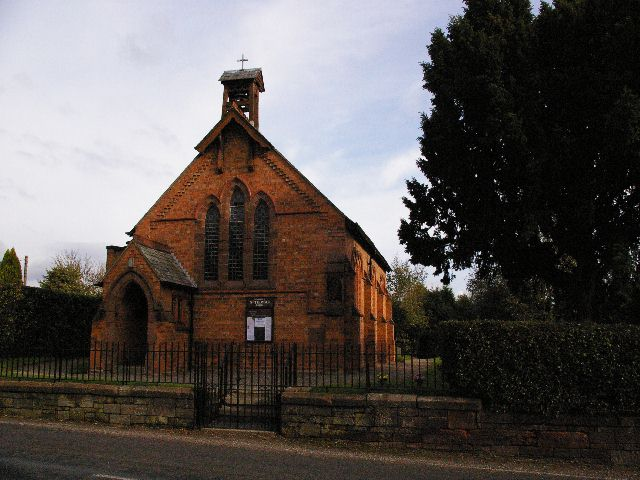
- St. Thomas's Church, Eaton

- Location within Cheshire
- OS grid reference: SJ573634
- Civil parish: Rushton
- Unitary authority: Cheshire West and Chester
- Ceremonial county: Cheshire
- Region: North West
- Country: England
- Sovereign state: United Kingdom
- Post town: TARPORLEY
- Postcode district: CW6
- Dialling code: 01829
- Police: Cheshire
- Fire: Cheshire
- Ambulance: North West
- UK Parliament: Chester South and Eddisbury

Eaton is a small village and former civil parish in the Cheshire West and Chester district, in the ceremonial county of Cheshire, England, about two miles from the town of Tarporley. It is now in the parish of Rushton. In 1931 the parish had a population of 353.

The village contains the Jessie Hughes Village Hall, Eaton Primary School and the church of St Thomas.

== Governance ==
Eaton was formerly a township in the parish of Tarporley, in 1866 Eaton became a civil parish, on 1 April 1936 the parish was abolished and merged with Rushton, Utkinton and Tarporley.

== Jessie Hughes Village Hall ==
The original Jessie Hughes Village Hall was opened on 26 September 1926. The main instigator in building the hall was Mrs Jessie Hughes, the wife of the Rector of Tarporley. At the time she was the president of the Women's Institute and played a pivotal role in raising money for the village hall to be built. She died in 1928, but her work is still remembered through an inscribed stone reading "This stone was laid by Jessie L Hughes 1926". The building fell into disrepair and was rebuilt in 2008. The replacement building retained the name Jessie Hughes Village Hall following a local ballot, and was joint winner of the Cheshire Pride Community Project Award in 2008.

== See also ==
- St Thomas' Church, Eaton
