= Listed buildings in Utkinton =

Utkinton is a former civil parish, now in the parishes of Utkinton and Cotebrook and Tarporley, in Cheshire West and Chester, England. It is entirely rural, and contains the villages of Utkinton and Cotebrook. The A49 road runs through it in a north–south direction. The parish contains 14 buildings that are recorded in the National Heritage List for England as designated listed buildings. One of these, Utkinton Hall, is listed at Grade I, and all the others are in Grade II. Other than the hall, some of the listed buildings are associated with the hall, and the others are domestic buildings, or related to farming. In Cotebrook, the church and its former parsonage are listed and, more recently, the Utkinton war memorial has been listed.

== Key ==
Grade	Criteria
Grade I	Buildings of exceptional interest, sometimes considered to be internationally important.
Grade II	Buildings of national importance and special interest.

== Buildings ==
Name and location	Photograph	Date	Notes	Grade
Utkinton Hall; 53.1769°N 2.6705°W		Medieval	This former manor house has a medieval core, but most of the present house dates from the 17th and 18th centuries, since when it has been reduced in size. What remains is an L-shaped building in sandstone and brick, with slate roofs. It includes a row of four gables, one of which is timber-framed.	I
Bailiff's House; 53.1769°N 2.6719°W		Early 17th century	Much modified in the 20th century, this is a long rectangular building. It is constructed in sandstone with a Kerridge stone slate roof. It is in three storeys, and has a six-bay front and mullioned windows. At the centre is a gabled porch, and at the right end is a flight of steps leading up to a first-floor door. Its original purpose is not known.	II
Stables, Fishersgreen Farmhouse; 53.1743°N 2.6814°W	—	17th century	Constructed in timber framing with brick nogging on a tall stone plinth, the building has a corrugated iron roof. It is in a single storey with a three-bay front, and has a door at each end. Inside is a timber-framed partition.	II
Yew Tree Cottage; 53.1806°N 2.6440°W	—	Late 17th century	The cottage is constructed in whitened stone and brick and has a thatched roof. It is in one storey with attics, and has two bays. The windows in the ground floor are casements. There are more windows in the gabled attics and a small window in the east gable-end.	II
Fishersgreen Farmhouse; 53.1744°N 2.6812°W	—	1693	Later additions and alterations were made to this sandstone house with slate roofs. It is in two storeys with a symmetrical three-bay front. The lateral bays have casement windows with a gabled half-dormer above. In the central bay is a gabled porch with a date plaque above.	II
Walls and gatepiers, Utkinton Hall; 53.17710°N 2.67083°W		c.1700	These consist of the wall along the roadside, with its gatepiers, and the wall of the west terrace. The walls are in sandstone The gatepiers have a stone base, and contain brick panels framed in stone. On their tops are capstones with ball finials.	II
North terrace walls, Utkinton Hall; 53.17752°N 2.6715°W		c.1700	The walls are in sandstone and were intended for a terrace forming a boundary to a bowling green.	II
Garden walls and gatepiers, Utkinton Hall; 53.17698°N 2.67025°W		c.1700	The walls are in sandstone and contain a pair of gatepiers in the centre. These are square, standing on moulded plinths, and surmounted by moulded capstones with ball finials.	II
Barn, Utkinton Hall; 53.1771°N 2.6700°W		c.1700	The barn is constructed in brick on a stone plinth with sandstone dressings, and has a corrugated iron roof. The original part has two storeys and is in three bays. A single-bay extension was added in the 19th century.	II
16 Northgate; 53.1827°N 2.6772°W		Early 18th century	Originating as a terrace of four cottages, later converted into a single house. It is constructed in rendered sandstone with a thatched roof and brick chimneys. The building is in a single storey with attics. It has a six-bay front. In the third bay five steps lead up to a porch with a thatched gabled hood. Inside are two small inglenooks with wooden bressumers.	II
Hill House; 53.1694°N 2.6626°W	—	Late 18th century	The farmhouse was extended in the 19th century. It is built in brown and yellow brick on a stone plinth and has a slate roof. It is in three storeys, and has three-bay south front. The lateral bays have canted bay windows, and the centre bay contains a doorway with an Ionic architrave and a fanlight. To the right is a two-storey single-bay extension. The windows are a mixture of sashes and casements.	II
St John's Church, Cotebrook; 53.1855°N 2.6430°W		1874–75	This is a small church designed by G. E. Street. It is constructed in sandstone and has a tiled roof. It consists of a four-bay nave, a short chancel with a vestry beneath, and a small northeast tower with a pyramidal cap and a weathervane. Some of the windows contain stained glass by Kempe.	II
Old Parsonage, Cotebrook; 53.1854°N 2.6437°W	—	1888	Designed by Douglas & Fordham, the house is constructed in red Ruabon brick with Lakeland slate roofs. It is in two storeys and has a symmetrical three-bay front. The centre bay projects forward and has a stuccoed gable. The lateral bays have brick diapering with stucco infill. The windows are mullioned.	II
War memorial 53.18367°N 2.67971°W		1918	The war memorial stands in an enclosure by a road junction. It consists of a crucifix carved in teak, on a sandstone plinth, on blocks of Eddisbury stone. On three sides of the plinth are inscriptions and the names of those lost in the two World Wars.	II

== See also ==
- Listed buildings in Clotton Hoofield
- Listed buildings in Delamere
- Listed buildings in Oakmere
- Listed buildings in Rushton
- Listed buildings in Tarporley
- Listed buildings in Willington
