= St Thomas' Church, Eaton =

Church in Cheshire, England

Coordinates: 53.1657°N 2.6398°W

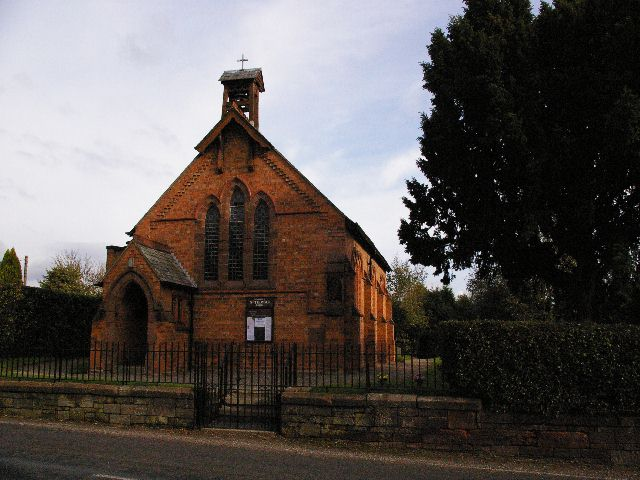
St Thomas' Church, Eaton

St Thomas' Church is in Royal Lane, Eaton, Cheshire, England. It is an active Anglican parish church in the deanery of Malpas, the archdeaconry of Chester, and the diocese of Chester. Its benefice is united with those of St Helen, Tarporley, St John and Holy Cross, Cotebrook, and St Paul Utkinton. It is a small brick church built in 1896, with lancet windows, a west porch, and a timber bellcote. In 1936 the Lancaster architect Henry Paley of Austin and Paley refitted the church with a new marble floor to the sanctuary, reredos, pulpit, stalls, chancel screen, and with the creation of an organ chamber.

== See also ==
- List of ecclesiastical works by Austin and Paley (1916–44)
