= St John's Church, Cotebrook =

Coordinates: 53.1855°N 2.6430°W

St John and the Holy Cross Church, Cotebrook
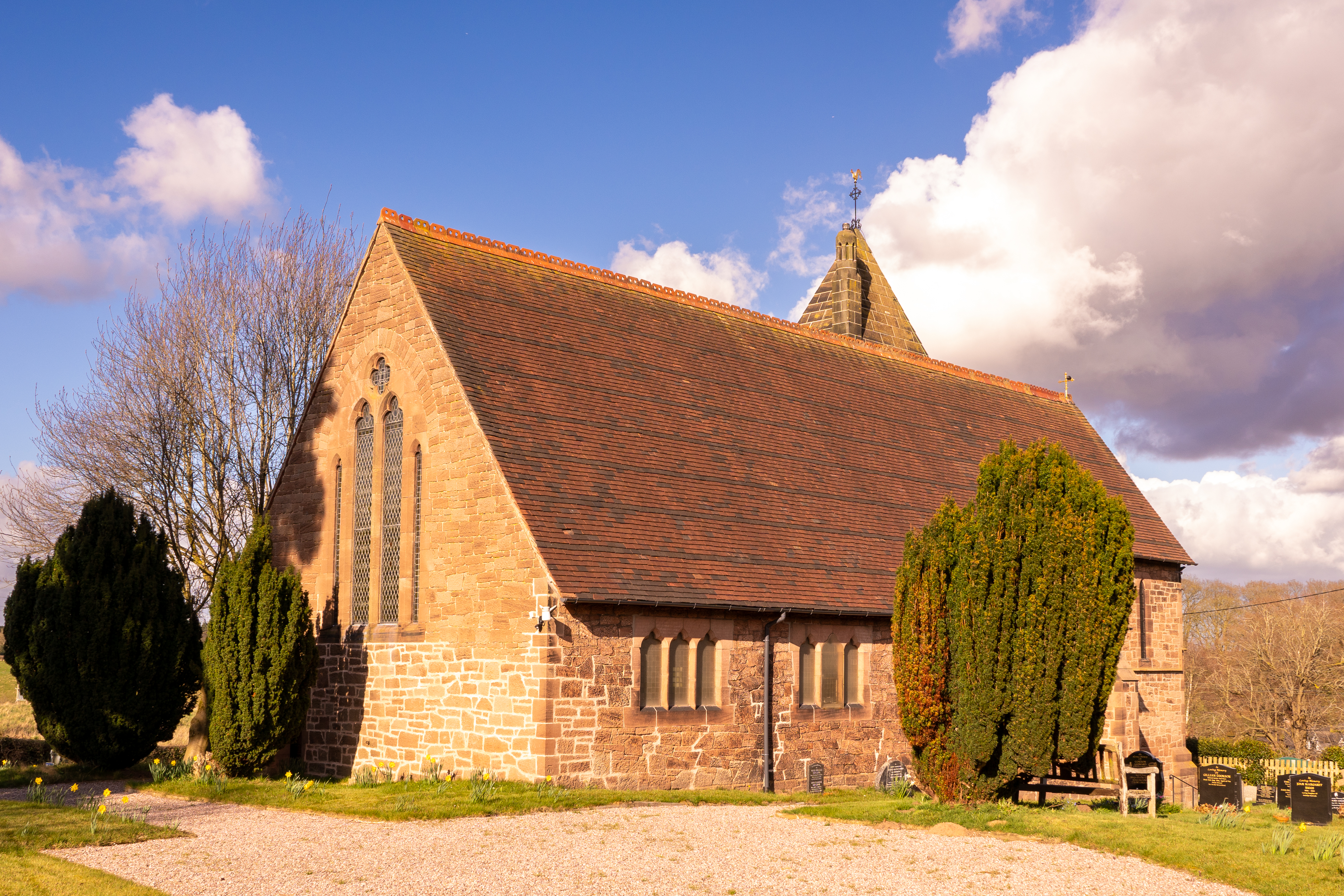
- St John's Church, Cotebrook, from the southeast

- Location in Cheshire
- OS grid reference: SJ 571 656
- Location: Stable Lane, Cotebrook, Cheshire
- Country: England
- Denomination: Anglican
- Website: St John, Cotebrook

History
- Status: Parish church

Architecture
- Functional status: Active
- Heritage designation: Grade II
- Designated: 17 April 1986
- Architect: G. E. Street
- Architectural type: Church
- Style: Gothic Revival
- Groundbreaking: 1874
- Completed: 1875

Administration
- Province: York
- Diocese: Chester
- Archdeaconry: Chester
- Deanery: Tarporley
- Parish: Tarporley

Clergy
- Rector: Revd Keith Ernest Hine

St John and the Holy Cross Church is in Stable Lane, Cotebrook, Cheshire, England. It is an active Anglican church in the parish of Tarporley, the deanery of Malpas, the archdeaconry of Chester, and the diocese of Chester. It is a daughter church of St Helen, Tarporley with St Thomas, Eaton. The church is recorded in the National Heritage List for England as a designated Grade II listed building.

== History ==
St John's was built in 1874–75 to a design by G. E. Street.

== Architecture ==
The church is constructed in red sandstone rubble with ashlar dressings. It has a roof of red tiles that are pierced along the ridge. Its plan consists of a four-bay nave, a short chancel with a vestry beneath, and a northeast tower. The tower is located in the angle between the nave and the chancel, and is buttressed. It contains a clock face and louvred lancet bell openings. At the summit is a pyramidal cap with a weathervane. The nave windows are small, with three lights and trefoil heads. On the sides of the chancel are two lancet windows. Beneath the chancel, the vestry has a door with a Caernarvon arch, and a two-light mullioned window. The east end is buttressed and contains a triple lancet window. At the west end are four lancet windows with trefoil heads, with a quatrefoil window above, and an entrance doorway leading to an internal porch.

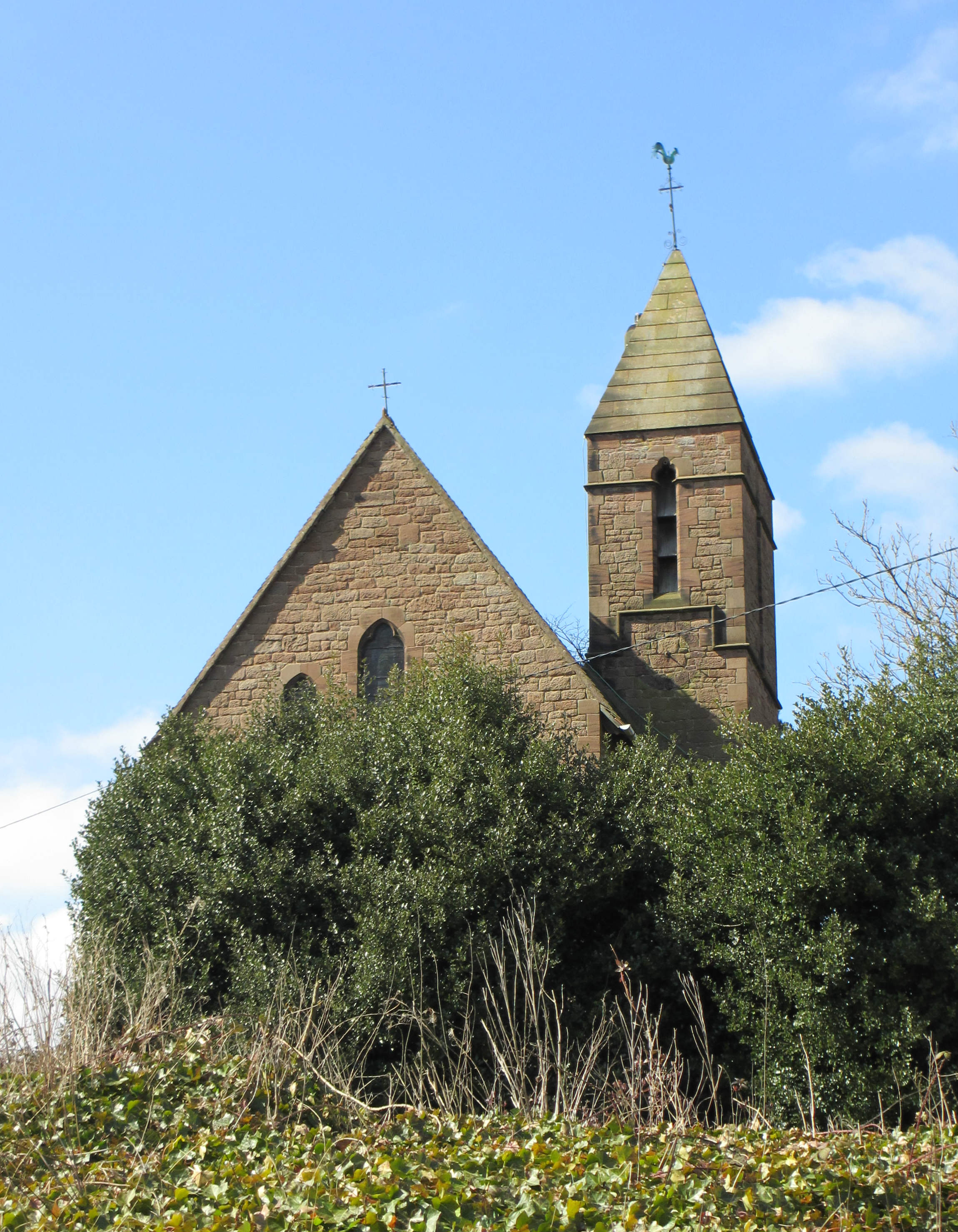
St John's Church, Cotebrook, from the east

The font is octagonal, and is carried on eight clustered shafts. Above the altar is a 17th-century painting of the Petition of the Repentant Sinners. The east window contains stained glass dated 1882 by Kempe, which is a memorial to Sir Philip de Malpas Grey-Egerton and his wife. There are other windows containing glass by Kempe, dated between 1885 and 1895.

== See also ==
- Listed buildings in Utkinton
