= Clotton Hoofield =

Civil parish in Cheshire, England

Coordinates: 53.158°N 2.728°W

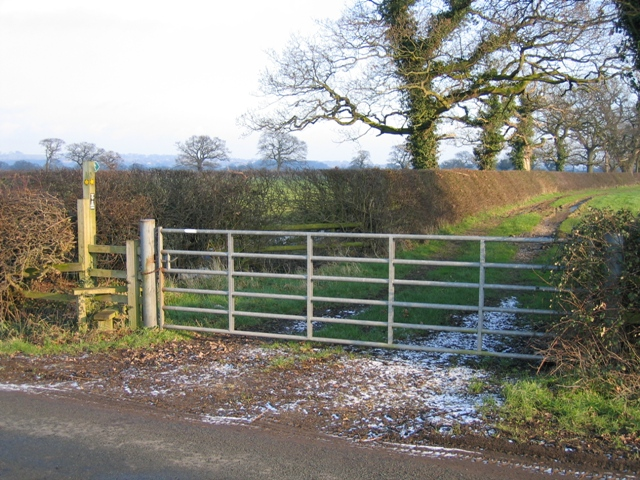
- Eddisbury Way

- Location within Cheshire
- Population: 308 (2001)
- OS grid reference: SJ5162
- Civil parish: Clotton Hoofield
- Unitary authority: Cheshire West and Chester
- Ceremonial county: Cheshire
- Region: North West
- Country: England
- Sovereign state: United Kingdom
- Post town: CHESTER
- Postcode district: CH3
- Post town: Tarporley
- Postcode district: CW6
- Dialling code: 01829
- Police: Cheshire
- Fire: Cheshire
- Ambulance: North West
- UK Parliament: Chester South and Eddisbury

Clotton Hoofield is a civil parish in the Borough of Cheshire West and Chester and ceremonial county of Cheshire in England. It has a population of 308. The largest settlements in the parish are Clotton, Clotton Common and Hoofield.

== See also ==
- Listed buildings in Clotton Hoofield
