= Listed buildings in Clotton Hoofield =

Clotton Hoofield is a civil parish in Cheshire West and Chester, England. It contains 17 buildings that are recorded in the National Heritage List for England as designated listed buildings, all of which are at Grade II. This grade is the lowest of the three gradings given to listed buildings and is applied to "buildings of national importance and special interest". The parish contains the small settlements of Clotton and Hoofield, but is otherwise rural. The listed buildings are all either domestic or related to farming. They fall into two time-groups; those originating in the 16–17th centuries, and those from the 19th century. All the buildings originating before the later part of the 17th century are timber-framed, or have timber-framed cores; The later buildings are in brick.

Name and location	Photograph	Date	Notes
Brook House Farmhouse; 53.1734°N 2.7107°W		Mid-16th century	The original part of the farmhouse is timber-framed on a stone plinth with a slate roof. This is in three bays. A single bay extension was added in the 19th century in rendered stone. The whole building has two storeys, the upper storeys being jettied. The windows are casements. On the right side is a flight of stone steps.
Wynnstay Farmhouse; 53.1708°N 2.7113°W	—	1611	The building is timber-framed with plastered nogging on a stone plinth. Its roof is tiled. The front is in one and two storeys, and has five bays. On the front is a shaped lintel inscribed with initials and the date. The windows are casements.
Stable, Wynnstay Farmhouse; 53.1707°N 2.7114°W		Early 17th century	Formerly stables, and rebuilt in the 19th century, the building is timber-framed with brick nogging on a stone plinth, and with a slate roof. It is in two storeys, with a four-bay front. The building contains four doors and four pitch holes, three of which are circular, and the other square.
Brook Cottage; 53.1624°N 2.7249°W	—	Early 17th century	The cottage is timber-framed with brick nogging and a concrete tile roof. It is in a single storey with an attic, and has a two-bay front. Inside is an inglenook and a bressumer.
Holly Cottage; 53.1702°N 2.7108°W		Early 17th century	The original part of the building is timber-framed with brick nogging on a stone plinth. It was extended in brick during the 19th century. The cottage is in a single storey and has a gabled front. Its roof is covered in corrugated iron. The windows are casements.
Townhouse Farmhouse; 53.1696°N 2.7101°W		Early 17th century	The original part of the building is timber-framed with plastered nogging on a stone plinth. Later in the 17th century it was extended by one bay in sandstone. The building has a slate roof, is in one and two storeys, and has a four-bay front. In the lower floor are casement windows, above are horizontally-sliding sash windows, and in the left gable end the window is mullioned.
Yewtree Farmhouse; 53.1743°N 2.7216°W		Early 17th century	The farmhouse was altered and extended in the 19th century for the Tollemache estate. It is timber-framed with brick nogging on a stone plinth, and with a tiled roof. The farmhouse is in a single storeys, with attics, and has a six-bay front. The windows in the ground floor are casements, and those in the attics are dormers. Associated with the house is a sandstone wall incorporating a five-step mounting block; this is included in the listing.
Common House Farmhouse; 53.1747°N 2.7098°W	—	17th century	The farmhouse dates mainly from the 19th century. It is constructed in brick with a slate roof. The house is in two storeys, and has a rear wing, giving it a T-shaped plan. The windows are casements. To the rear of the house are a 19th-century pump with a stone trough, and a small stone pigsty with a slate roof; both of these items are included in the designation.
Barn, Common House Farmhouse; 53.1749°N 2.7095°W	—	17th century	The building dates mainly from the 19th century, and consists of a barn, a stable and a dovecote. It is in brick with a slate roof. It contains doors, pitch holes, dove entry holes, and ventilation holes (breathers) in various patterns.
Drifthouse, Common House Farmhouse; 53.1750°N 2.7098°W	—	Mid-17th century	This is a timber-framed building with brick nogging on a stone plinth. It has retained its original roof of large slates with a sandstone ridge. The gables contain brick, and there is one pitch hole.
Clotton Cottage; 53.1711°N 2.7119°W	—	Mid-17th century	This originated as a farmhouse, then was converted into two estate cottages for the Tollemache estate, and subsequently used as a house. It is timber-framed with brick nogging on a stone plinth, and has a red tiled roof. It is in one storey with an attic, and has a five-bay front. In the attic are gabled dormers, the other windows being casements.
Tollemache Farmhouse; 53.1695°N 2.7111°W		Late 17th century	A brick farmhouse with a slate roof that was altered in the 19th century. It has an L-shaped plan, is in two storeys, and has a symmetrical three-bay front. In the centre of the front is a two-storey projecting gabled porch. The windows are casements. On the front of the house is a five-step mounting block containing a dog's kennel.
Holly Bank Farmhouse; 53.1699°N 2.7113°W		Early 19th century	A brick farmhouse with a slate roof. It is in two storeys, with a three-bay front. The windows are casements, and the doorcase has fluted pilasters and a triangular pediment.
Clotton Hall; 53.1703°N 2.7119°W		Early to mid-19th century	A brick farmhouse, standing on a stone plinth, with sandstone dressings and a slate roof. It is in three storeys, with a symmetrical three-bay front. The windows in the top storey are casements; those in the lower storeys are sashes. The doorcase has fluted pilasters and a triangular pediment.
Farm building, Clotton Hall; 53.1700°N 2.7125°W		Early to mid-19th century	Extended later in the century, the building is in brick with a slate roof, and has an L-shaped plan. It is in two storeys, the long west range having eleven bays, and the south range four. The central bay of the long range has a gable with a weathervane. Other features include doors, carriage openings, pitch holes and ventilation holes.
Hoofield Hall; 53.1600°N 2.7259°W		c. 1870	A farmhouse built for John Tollemache on his estate. It is in brick with a tiled roof. The farmhouse has two storeys, and a symmetrical five-bay front. The two lateral bays have gables that are partly timber-framed, and partly painted to resemble timber-framing. The gables have bargeboards, and finials. The windows are casements.
Barn, Hoofield Hall; 53.1602°N 2.7264°W		c. 1870	The barn was built for John Tollemache. It is in brick with a slate roof, and has a long rectangular plan. The barn is in two storeys, and has a seven-bay front. At the centre is a gable with timber framing. It contains doorways, casement windows, a pitch hole, and a hoist.

== See also ==
- Listed buildings in Willington
- Listed buildings in Utkinton and Cotebrook
- Listed buildings in Tarporley
- Listed buildings in Tiverton
- Listed buildings in Tilstone Fearnall
- Listed buildings in Huxley
- Listed buildings in Duddon
- Listed buildings in Burton
