= Brook Farm School =

Special school in Cheshire, England

Coordinates: 53.150°N 2.660°W

Information
- School type: Special Boarding School
- Established: 1975
- Closed: 2001

Brook Farm School was a state run 'special' boarding school in the village of Tarporley in the English county of Cheshire.

It opened in 1975 and closed August 31, 2001. The school catered for both residential and day pupils with emotional and behavioural difficulties.

The site stood empty for a while although there were plans to demolish it to make way for a new Primary school.

From March 2006 until 2011 the school was leased to The Storehouse Church.

In May 2013 the school was demolished to make way for a housing estate.
