= St Helen's Church, Tarporley =

Coordinates: 53.1580°N 2.6691°W

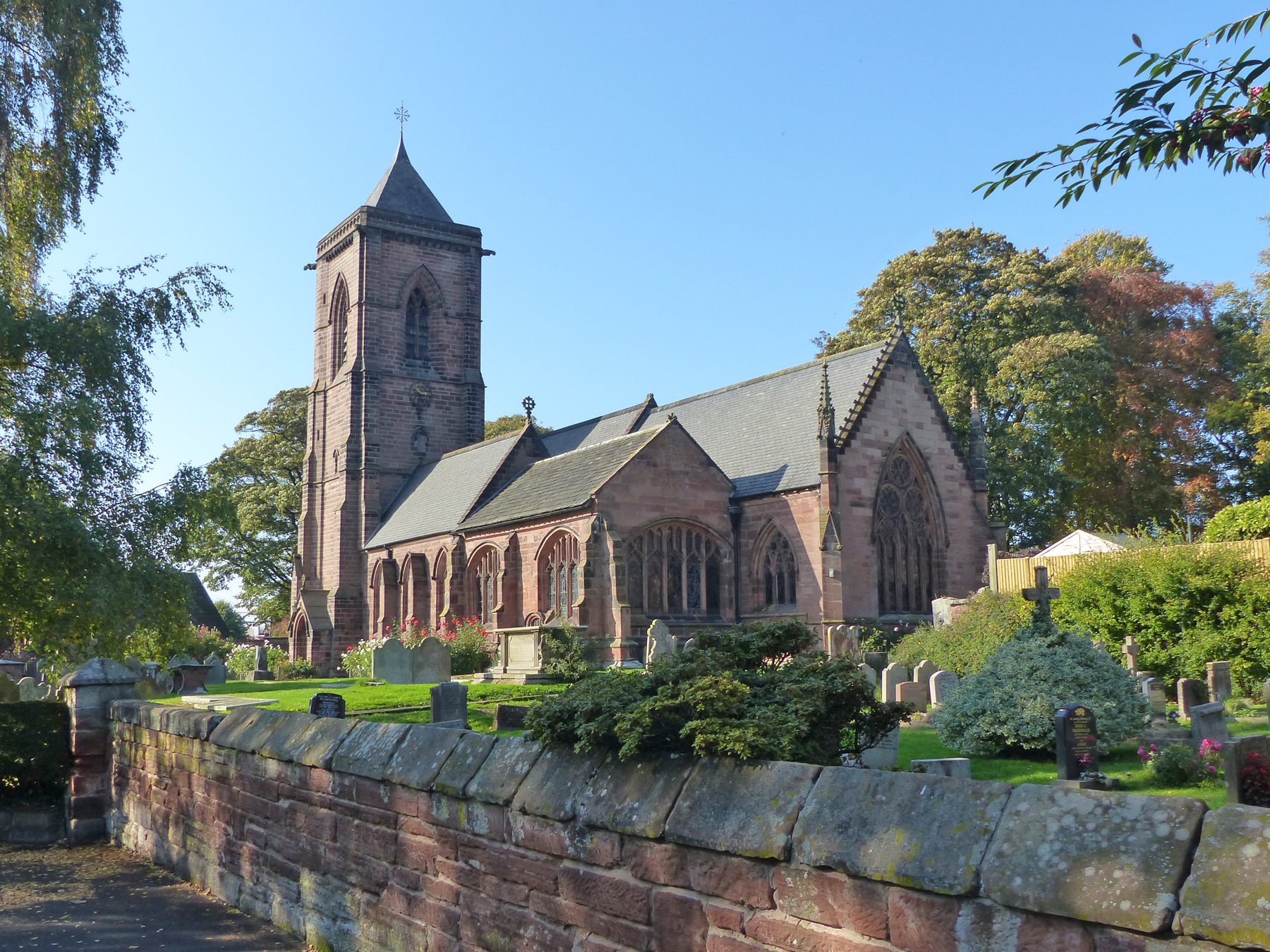
- St Helen's Church, Tarporley, from the southeast

- Location in Cheshire
- OS grid reference: SJ 554 625
- Location: Tarporley, Cheshire
- Country: England
- Denomination: Anglican
- Website: Tarporley, St Helen

History
- Status: Parish church
- Dedication: Saint Helen
- Dedicated: 3 January 1967

Architecture
- Functional status: Active
- Heritage designation: Grade II*
- Architect(s): J. S. Crowther, Sir Percy Worthington
- Architectural type: Church
- Style: Perpendicular, Gothic Revival
- Completed: 1932

Specifications
- Materials: Red sandstone ashlar, slate roof

Administration
- Province: York
- Diocese: Chester
- Archdeaconry: Chester
- Deanery: Malpas
- Parish: Tarporley

Clergy
- Rector: Revd Georgina Watmore

St Helen's Church is in the village of Tarporley, Cheshire, England. It is an active Anglican parish church in the diocese of Chester, the archdeaconry of Chester and the deanery of Malpas. Its benefice is united with those of St John and Holy Cross, Cotebrook, St Thomas, Eaton, and St Paul, Utkinton. The church is recorded in the National Heritage List for England as a designated Grade II* listed building.

== History ==
The first documentary evidence of a church on this site is in 1287. The earliest parts of the present church are the two chapels which date from the 15th century. The rest of the church has been altered in a series of restorations. In 1785 the west end was rebuilt, and two years later the north wall was rebuilt, the interior seating was remodelled, and a gallery was added at the west end. Further extensive restorations were undertaken in 1834. The Arderne (north) chapel was remodelled in 1861, the Utkinton (south) chapel in 1865, the tower in 1878 and the nave in 1879, these three restorations being by J. S. Crowther of Manchester. A baptistry was added to the west end by Sir Percy Worthington in 1931–32. In 1935 the Arderne chapel was provided with a stone altar and renamed All Souls' chapel.

== Architecture ==
=== Exterior ===
The church is built in red sandstone ashlar with a slate roof. The plan of the church consists of a baptistry at the west end, a nave and chancel, north and south aisles with a chapel at the east end of each, a tower at the southwest corner and a south porch. The tower has a small pyramidal spire. The chapels are Perpendicular in style while the rest of the church is Decorated.

=== Interior ===
The nave has four bays with arcades dating from the 15th century, the piers on the north side being octagonal and those on the south side hexagonal. The chancel screen has Italian gates which were made in the 16th century and brought from Siena by the Countess of Haddington in 1889. Also in the church are two sanctuary chairs, an old vestment chest and a 15th-century octagonal font which spent some years in a farmyard. A collection of Cromwellian helmets and pieces of armour is kept in the church. The stained glass in the west window of the south aisle dated 1899 is by Kempe.

The main monuments are to the Done and Crewe families. In the Utkinton chapel is a large medallion in mezzo-relief to Sir John Done who died in 1617, and a similar monument to John Crewe who died in 1670. In the north chapel is the monument to Sir John Crewe who died in 1711 with his semi-recumbent effigy in a flowing robe and weeping cherubs at his head and feet. The finest memorial is the altar tomb in the chancel to Jane Done who died in 1662, Mary Crewe who died in 1690, and her granddaughter Mary Knightley who died as a child in 1674. The three figures are in white marble on a black base, the adults recumbent and the child standing holding flowers. Also in the church is a memorial board believed to have been painted by a member of the Randle Holme family of Chester. The organ was built by Henry Willis & Sons and restored in 1998 by Michael Fletcher. The parish registers start in 1558 and the churchwardens' accounts are almost complete from 1662. There is a ring of eight bells dated 1931 by John Taylor and Company.

== External features ==
In the churchyard is a red sandstone cross base and shaft from the 15th or 16th century which is listed at Grade II. Also in the churchyard is a war memorial in Portland stone designed by Sir Percy Scott Worthington. It consists of a lantern cross containing a carved figure of Christ, and is listed at Grade II. The churchyard also contains the war graves of a Royal Engineers soldier and two airmen of World War II. The lych gate is also listed at Grade II.

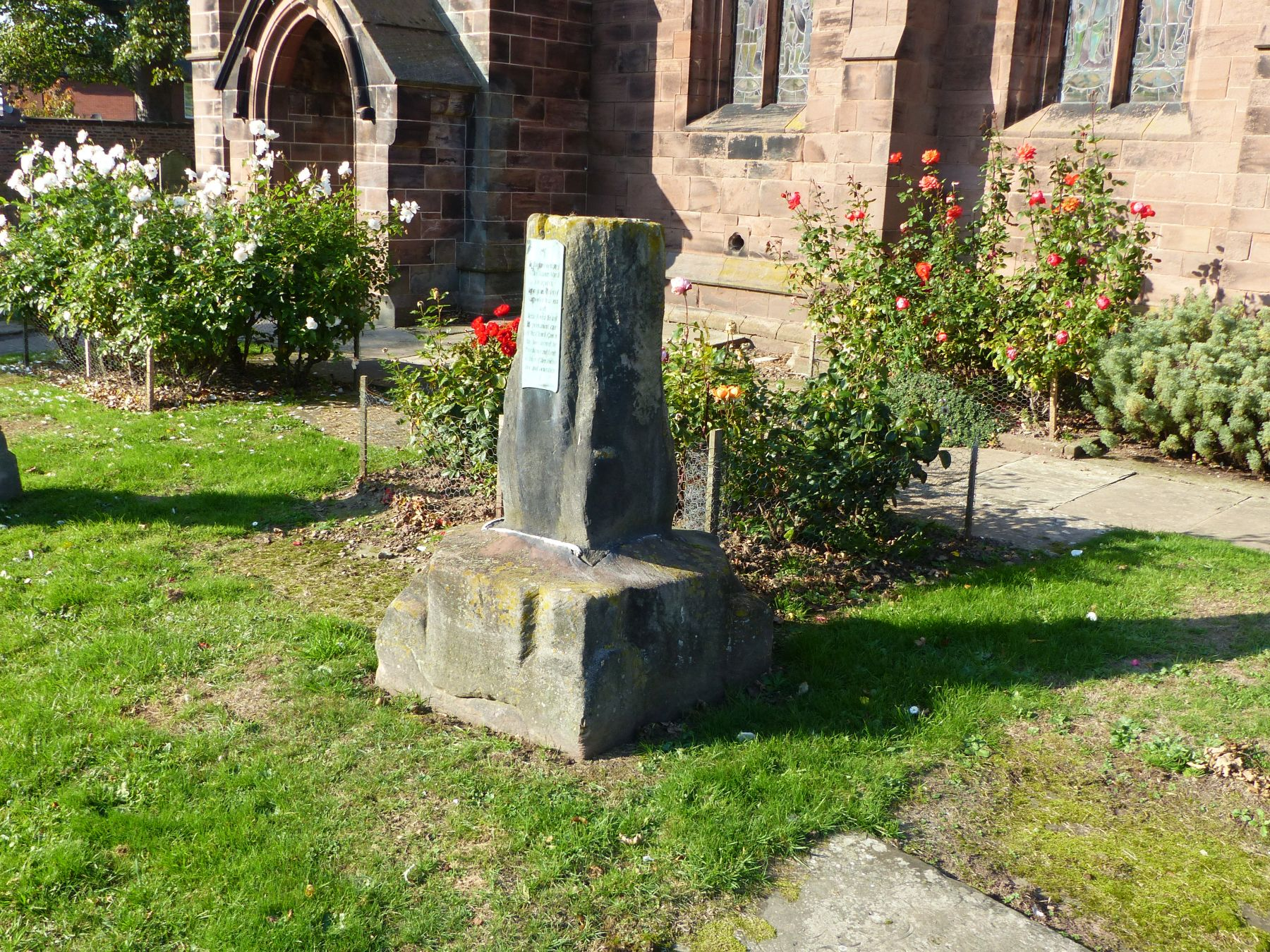
Churchyard cross

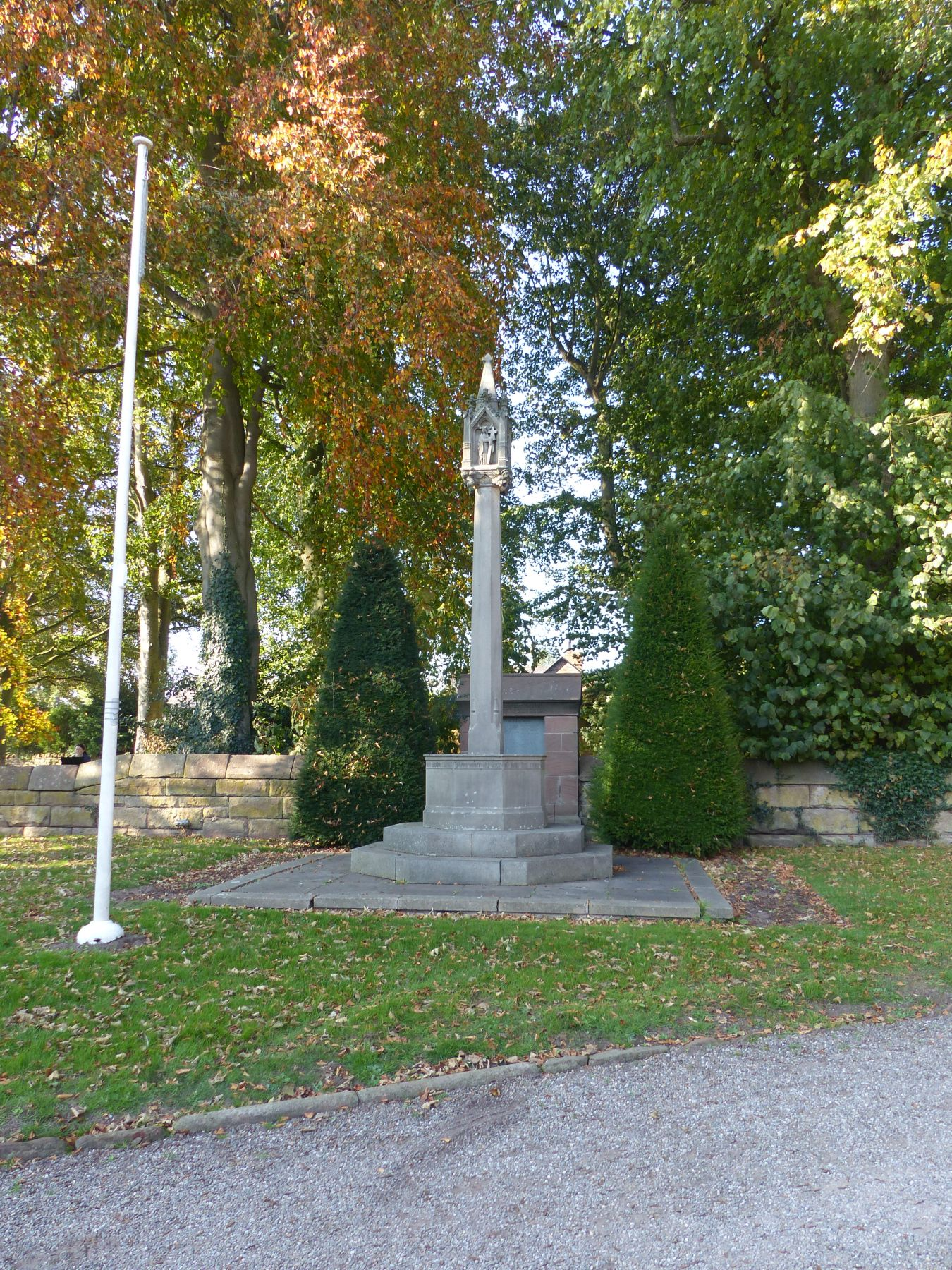
Tarporley War Memorial

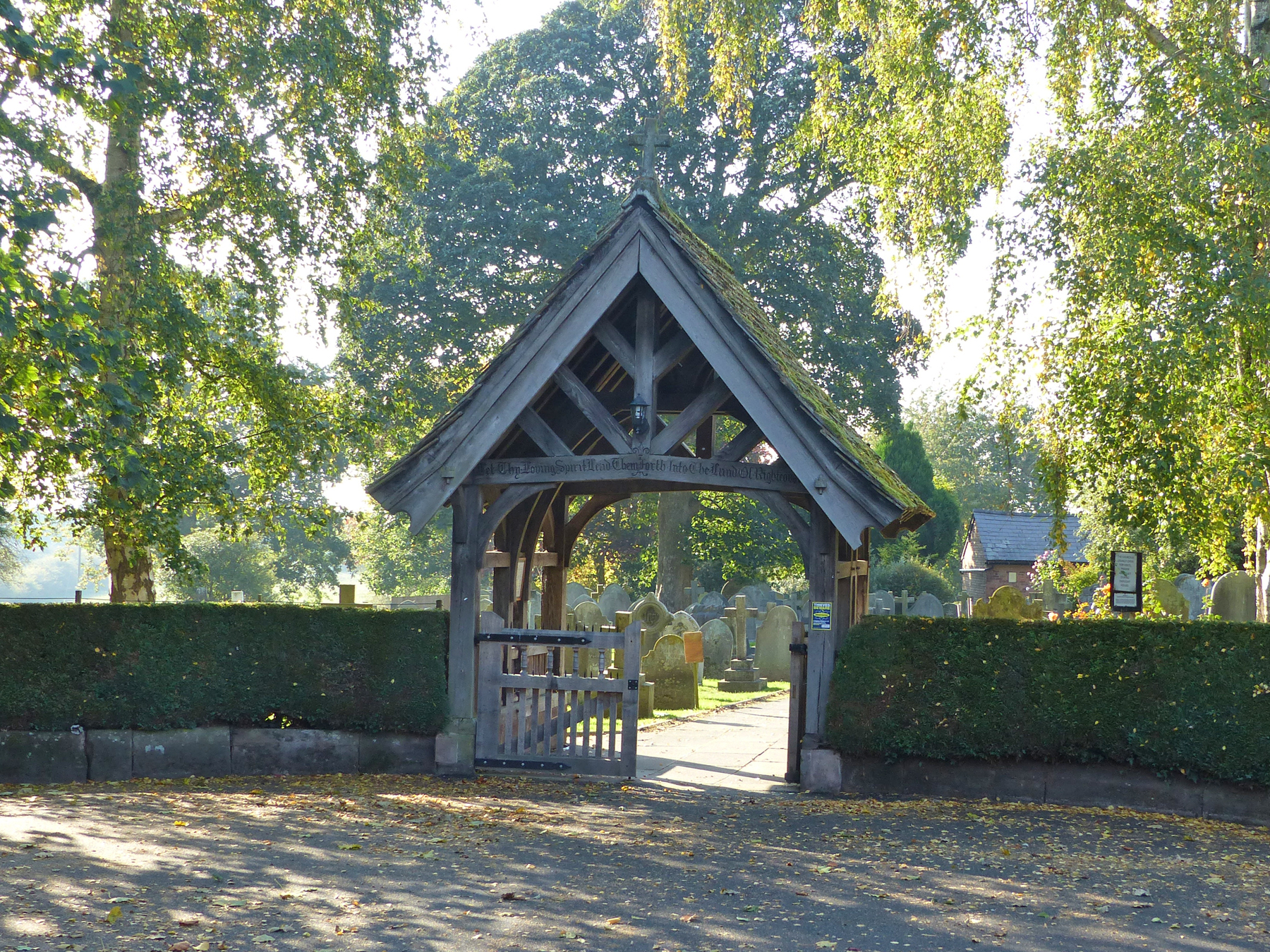
Lych gate

== See also ==
- Grade II* listed buildings in Cheshire West and Chester
- Listed buildings in Tarporley
- List of works by J. S. Crowther
