= Bell-cot =

Small framework and shelter for one or more bells

A bellcote, bell-cote or bell-cot is a small framework and shelter for one or more bells. Bellcotes are most common in church architecture but are also seen on institutions such as schools. The bellcote may be carried on brackets projecting from a wall or built on the roof of chapels or churches that have no towers. The bellcote often holds the Sanctus bell that is rung at the consecration of the Eucharist.

A bell-gable is similar, located at the apex of a gable or building end wall.

== Etymology ==
Bellcote is a compound noun of the words bell and cot or cote. Bell is self-explanatory. The word cot or cote is Old English, from Germanic. It means a shelter of some kind, especially for birds or animals (see dovecote), a shed, or stall.

Examples of bellcotes
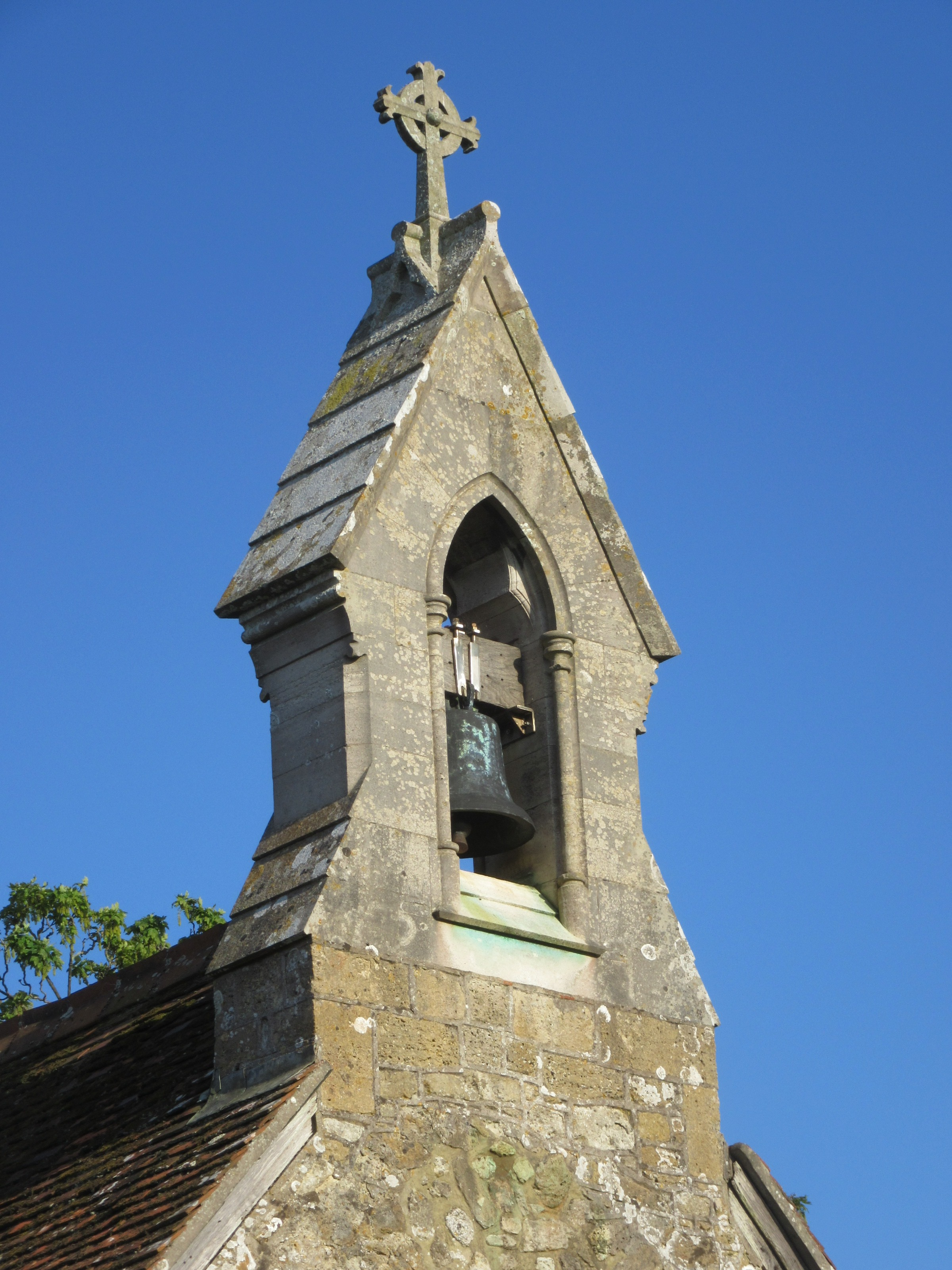
Bellcote at St Edmund's Church, Wootton, Isle of Wight, England

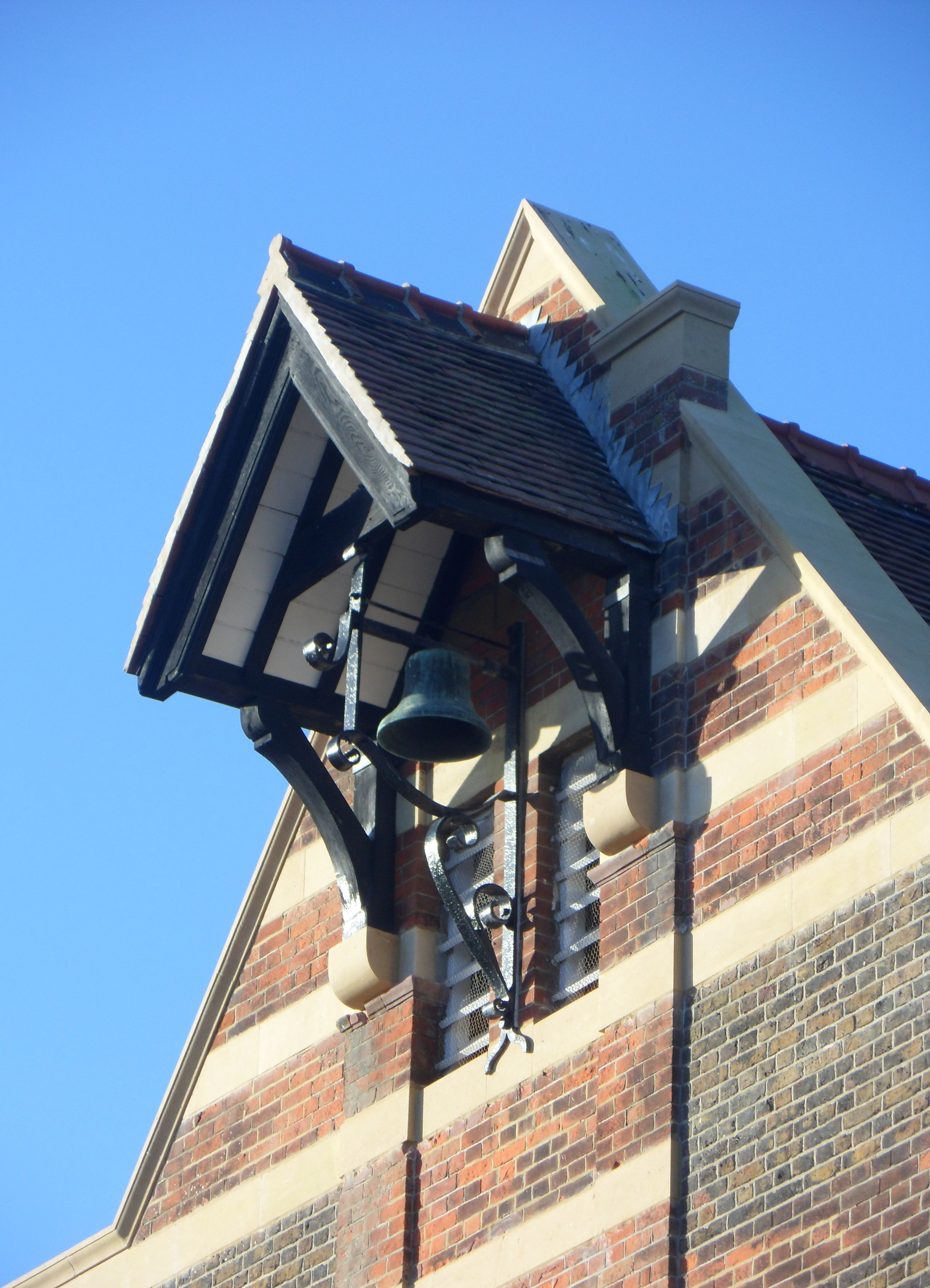
Bellcote at Stanford Road School, Prestonville, Brighton, England.

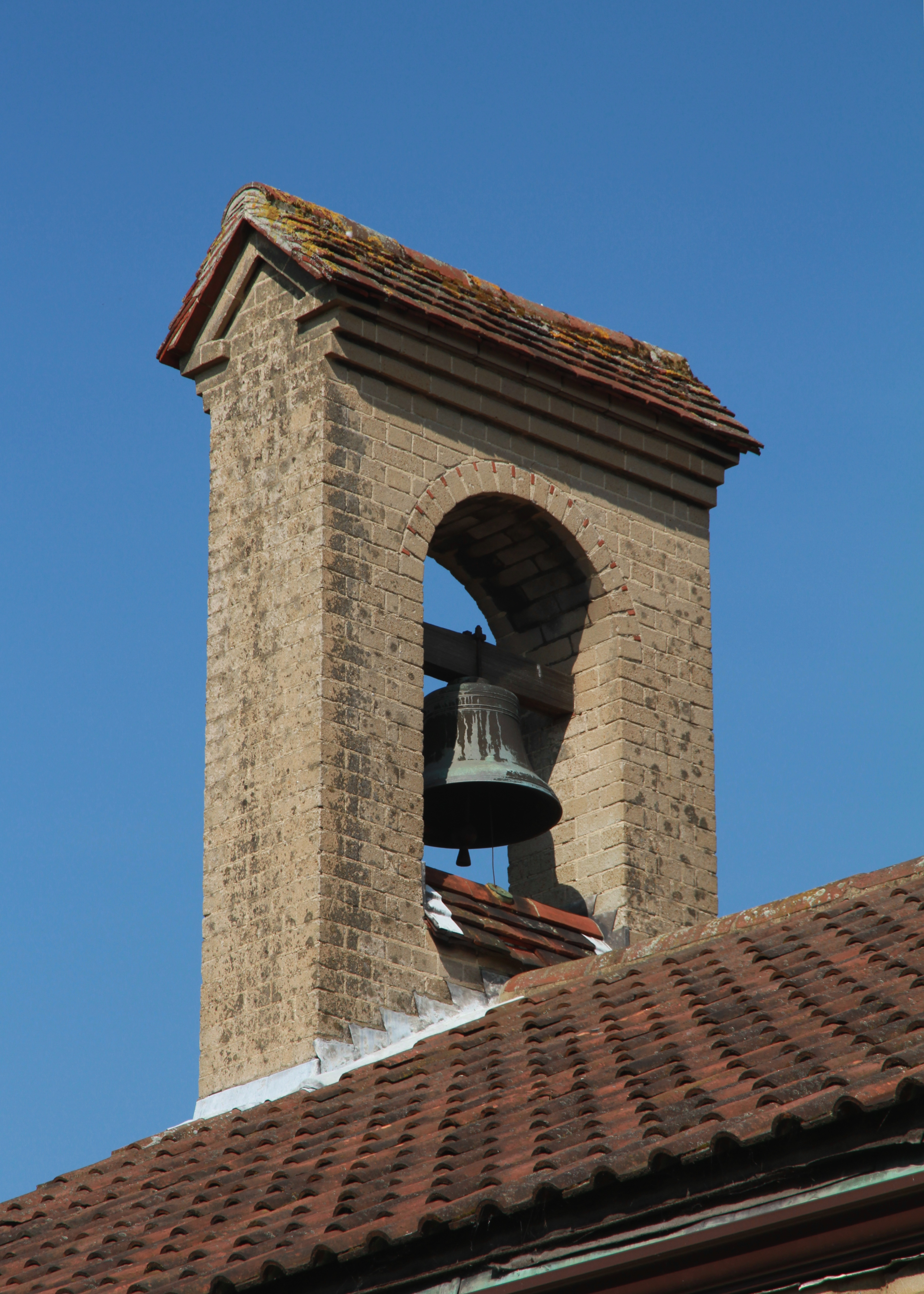
Bellcote on the parish church of St Alban the Martyr, Charles Street, Cowley, Oxford.

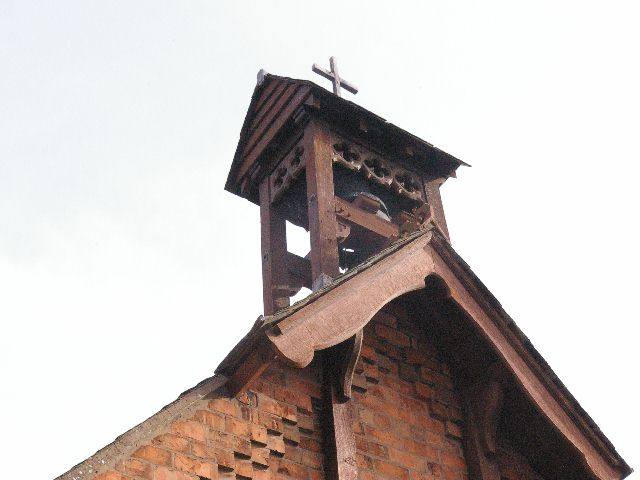
Bellcote on St Thomas' Church, Eaton, Cheshire.
