= Portal, Tarporley =

Country house in Cheshire, England

Coordinates: 53.16560°N 2.66019°W

Portal is a country house standing to the northeast of the village of Tarporley, Cheshire, England. It was built in 1900–05. The architect was Walter E. Tower, nephew and partner of the stained glass designer and manufacturer C. E. Kempe. It is a timber-framed building in Domestic Revival (Black-and-white Revival) style. The house is recorded in the National Heritage List for England as a designated Grade II* listed building. The architectural historian Nikolaus Pevsner says of it: "It is a tour de force in accurate but scaled-up imitation of timber-framed mansions".

== See also ==
- Grade II* listed buildings in Cheshire West and Chester
- Listed buildings in Tarporley
