= Utkinton Hall =

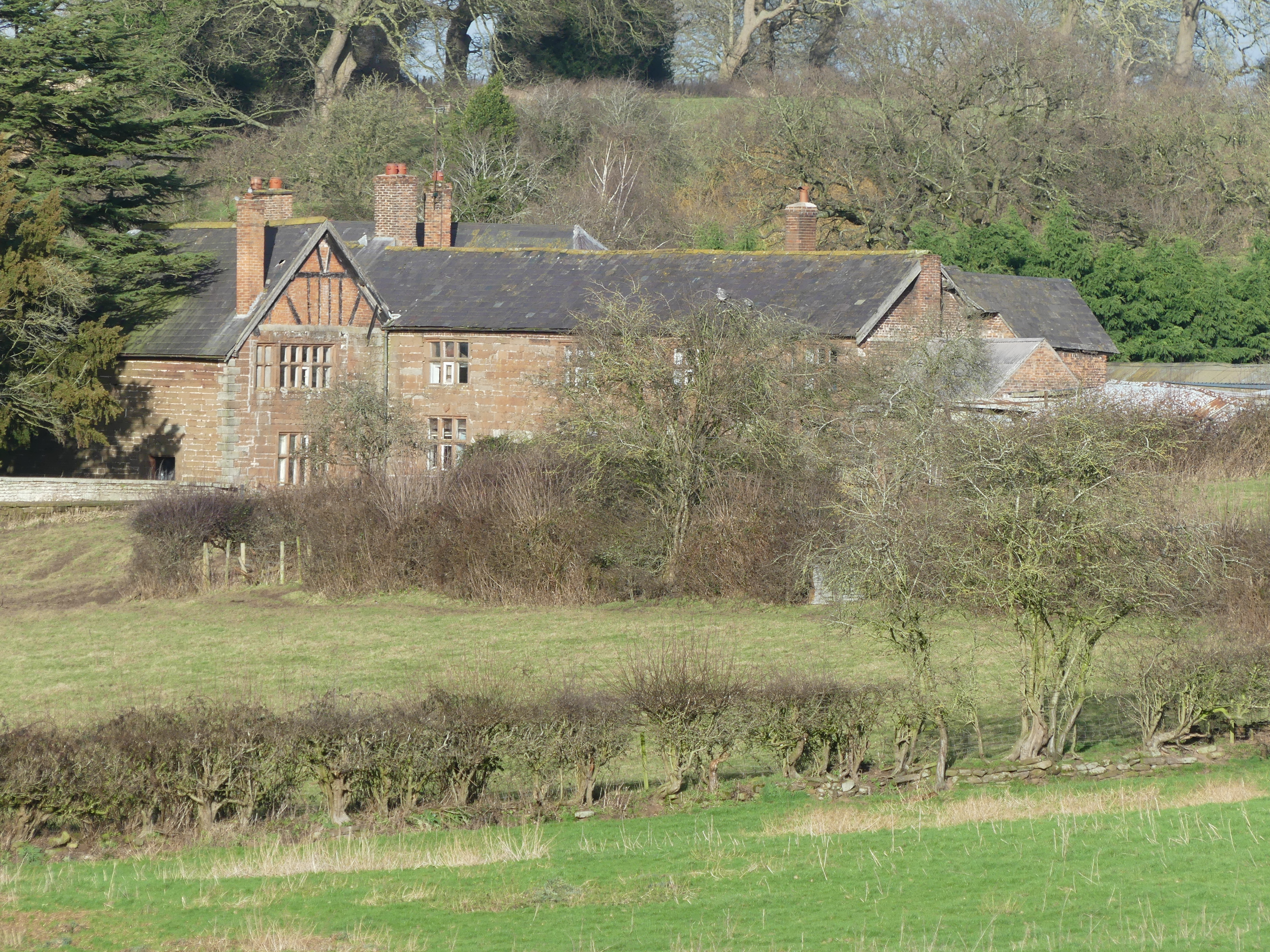
- Utkinton Hall from the southwest

- Location in Cheshire
- 53.1769°N 2.6705°W
- Location: Utkinton, Cheshire, England
- OS grid reference: SJ 552 646

Listed Building – Grade I
- Designated: 10 March 1953
- Reference no.: 1329835

Utkinton Hall is a country house to the southeast of the village of Utkinton, Cheshire, England. It is recorded in the National Heritage List for England as a designated Grade I listed building.

== History ==
The hall originated as a large manor house for the Done family, who were the hereditary wardens of Delamere Forest, and is now a farmhouse. It has a medieval core but most of it dates from the early 17th century. It was partly refaced around 1700 and again in the early 18th century for Sir John Crewe. The hall is built in ashlar red sandstone. Part of the hall has an orange brick façade with red sandstone dressings. It has a Welsh slate roof and brick chimneys. A barn, walls and gatepiers surrounding the hall are listed at Grade II.

James I visited the hall while hunting at Delamere Forest in 1617. Armorial stained glass that was formerly in the hall is now held in the Burrell Collection, Glasgow.

Other listed buildings at Utkinton Hall

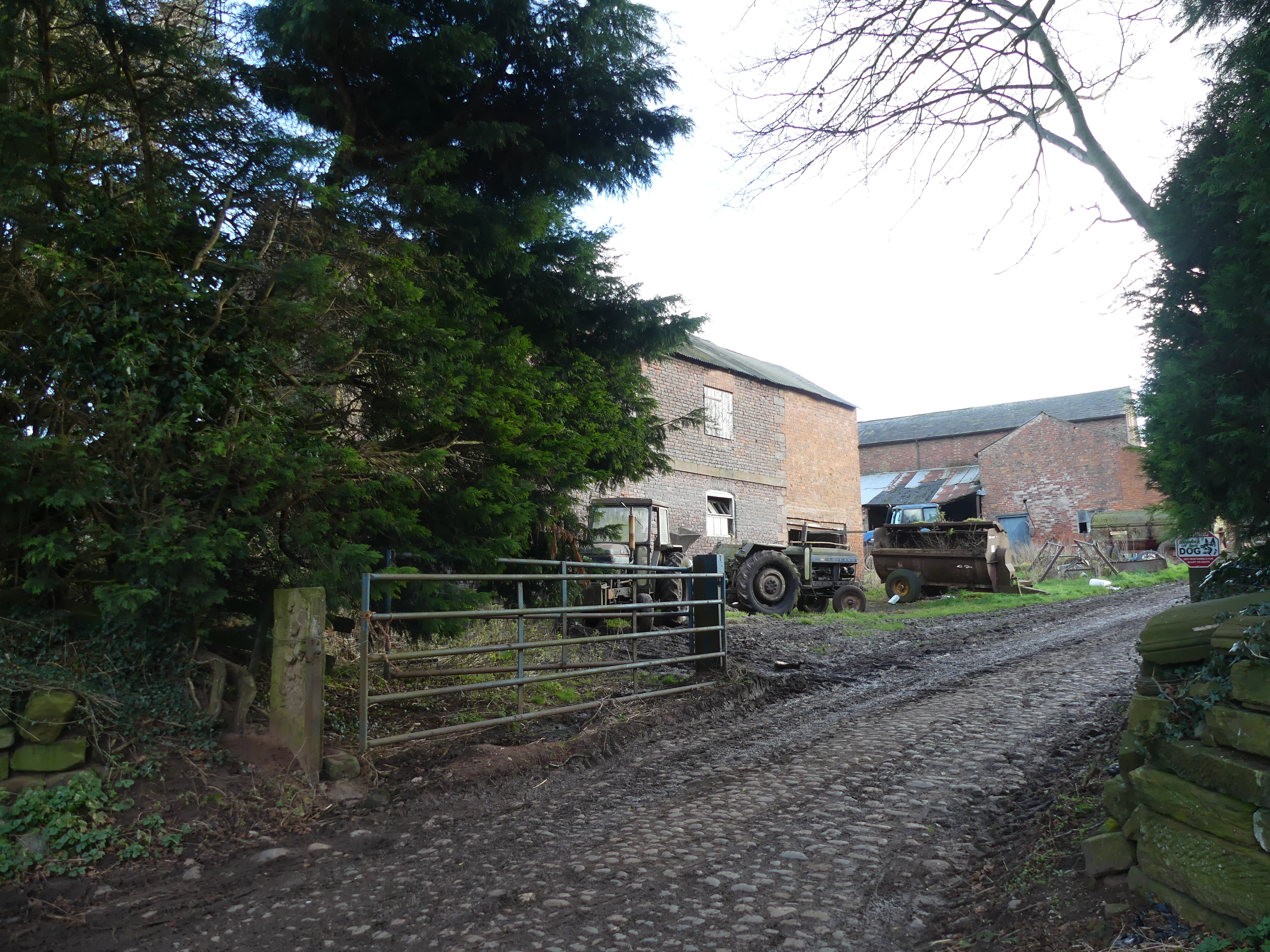
Barn to east

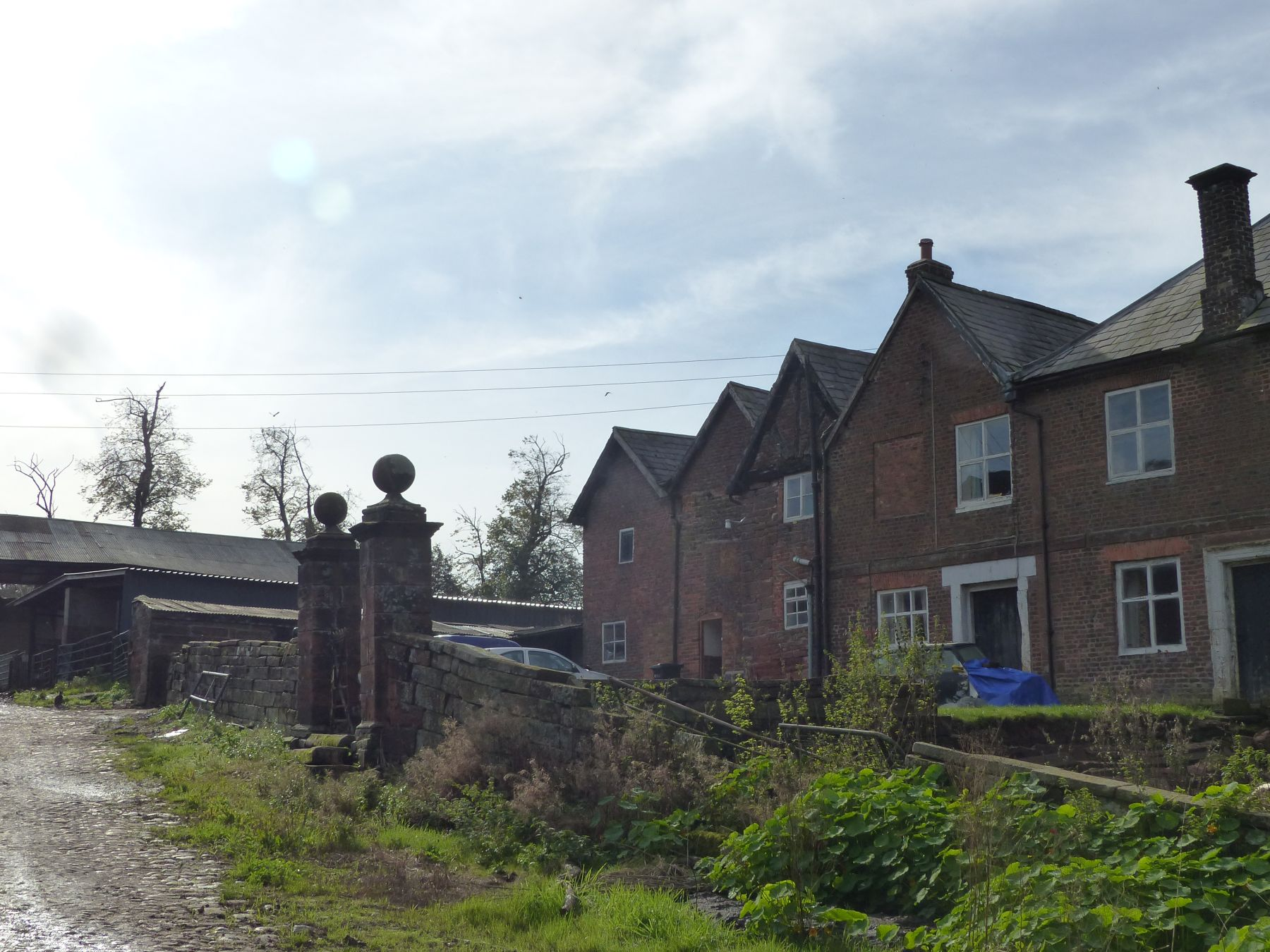
East garden walls and gatepiers

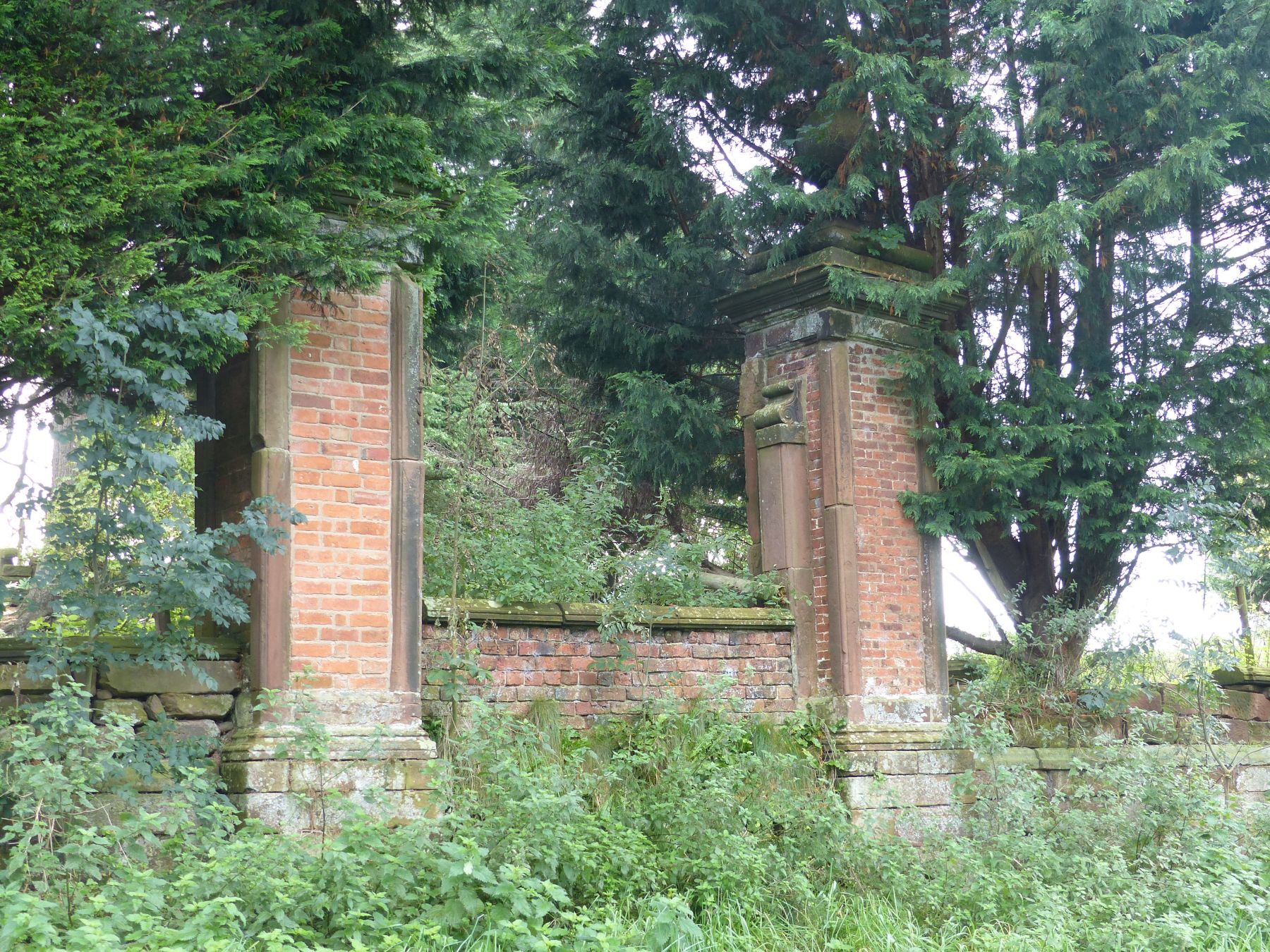
Roadside wall and gatepiers

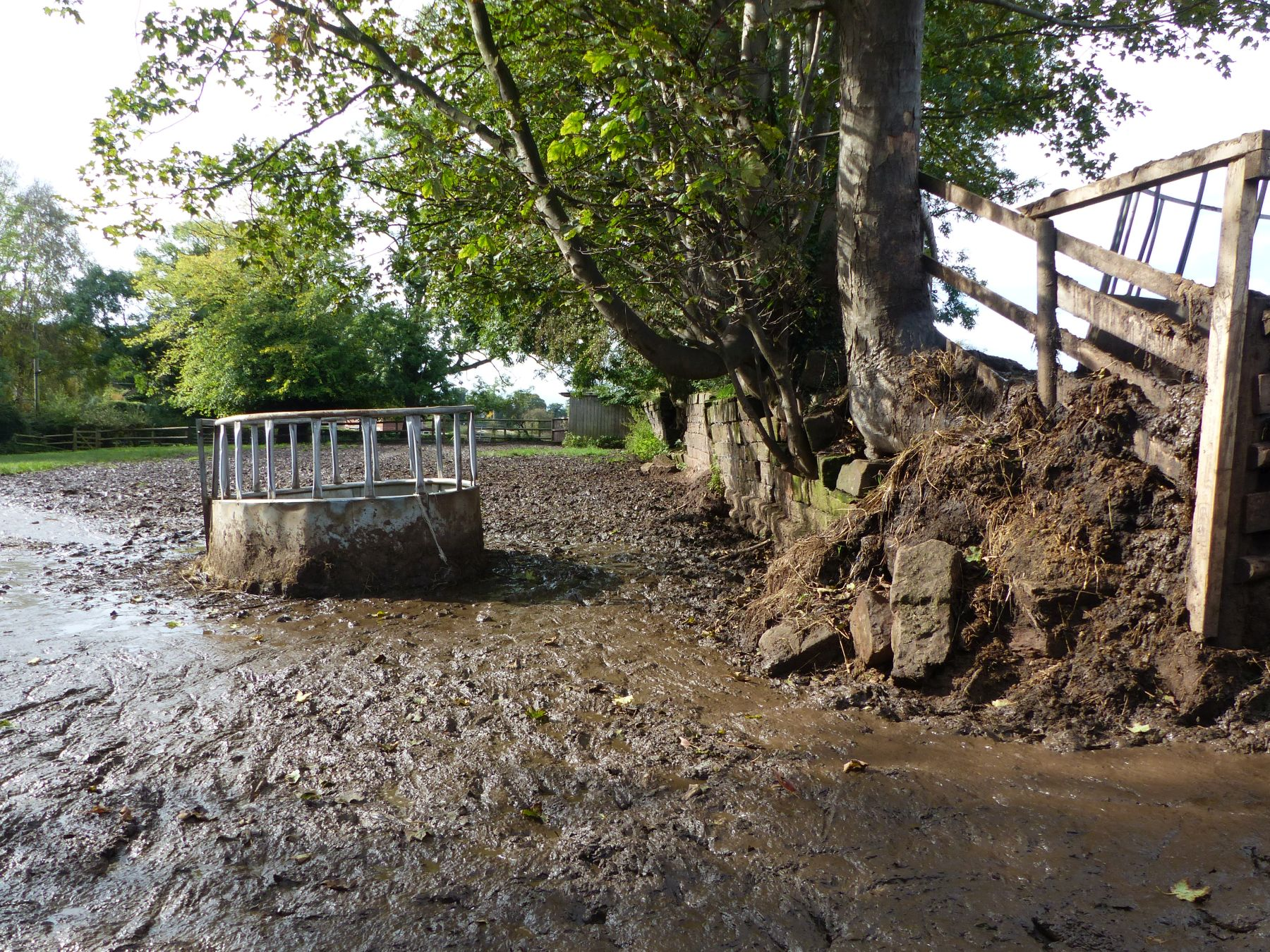
Terrace walls

== See also ==
- Listed buildings in Utkinton
- Grade I listed buildings in Cheshire West and Chester
