= Rushton, Cheshire =

Village in Cheshire, England

Coordinates: 53.17°N 2.62°W

Rushton
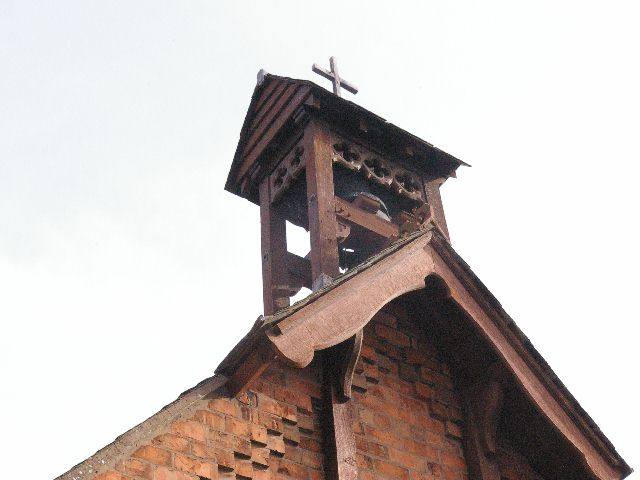
- St Thomas Church, Rushton

- Location within Cheshire
- Population: 484
- OS grid reference: SJ583640
- Civil parish: Rushton
- District: Cheshire West and Chester
- Ceremonial county: Cheshire
- Region: North West
- Country: England
- Sovereign state: United Kingdom
- Post town: Tarporley
- Postcode district: CW6
- Dialling code: 01829
- Police: Cheshire
- Fire: Cheshire
- Ambulance: North West
- UK Parliament: Chester South and Eddisbury

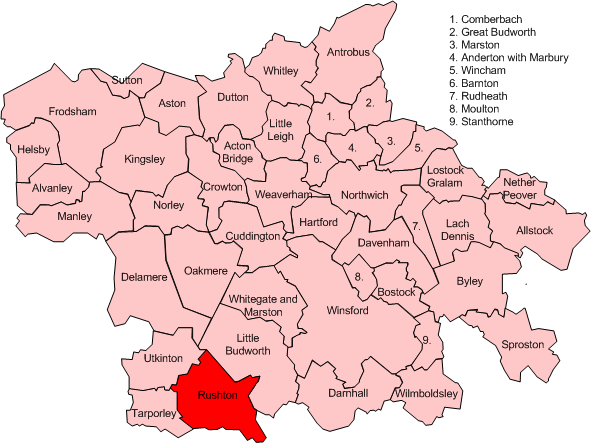
Map of civil parish of Rushton within the former borough of Vale Royal

Rushton is a village and civil parish in the unitary authority of Cheshire West and Chester and the ceremonial county of Cheshire, in the north west of England, approximately 6 miles (10 km) west of Winsford and 2 miles (3 km) north east of Tarporley. According to the 2011 census, Rushton has 484 people and is predominantly countryside. The parish includes the village of Eaton. This village contains the Jessie Hughes Village Hall, Eaton Primary School and the church of St Thomas.

In 1887 Rushton was described as

"Rushton.-- township, Tarporley par., Cheshire, on NE. side and in town of Tarporley, 1797 ac., pop. 334".

== Population ==
The first recorded population statistic was in the 1881 census. At that time the population was 334. Since then that number has fluctuated, but on the whole has increased. An example of this fluctuation is in 1911 where the population was 305. After that it increased up to 415 in 1951. Today the figure stands at 484.

Population change from 1881 to 1961

== Industry ==
In the 1881 census of England and Wales, the industry data showed 100 males and 95 females were eligible for work. Agriculture was the main industry in Rushton. 70 males and 9 females were involved in the industry. 2 adult males were without a specified occupation. However, when compared with adult females, 68 were without a specified job. The largest industry for women was domestic cleaning, which consisted of 15 females.

== Housing ==
The census in 1881 recorded 75 houses. Since then the number has increased, although large fluctuations have occurred. For example, the number of houses increased to 79 in 1901, but the next census after in 1921 saw a fall of 10 houses. In 2011 the census recorded 194 houses.

== Health ==
Figures from the 2011 census showed, 57.9% of residents of Rushton had very good health. When compared to Cheshire west and Chester(48.5), North West (46.5) and England in general(47.2), Rushton had a significant higher rating of very healthy people. This data was collected by local residents who described their health as very good. 30.2% of Rushton's residents described their health as good, this was a slightly lower percentage than the greater region of the North West (33.1) and England's data (34.2). Rushton has a very low disability rate. Only 4.3% had a disability or a long-term injury which has lasted/thought to last 12 months. This percentage is half the rate of the average in England

== Jessie Hughes Village Hall ==
The Jessie Hughes Hall or the Hall of Eaton was opened on 26 September 1926. The main instigator of the hall's construction was Mrs Jessie Hughes, wife of the Rector of Tarporley. At the time she was the president of the Women's Institute and played a pivotal role in raising money for the hall to be built. She laid the hall's cornerstone in 1926. She died in 1928 but her work is remembered through an inscribed stone reading "This stone was laid by Jessie L Hughes 1926".

The original village hall fell into disrepair and was rebuilt in 2008. The replacement building retained the name Jessie Hughes Village Hall following a local ballot, and was joint winner of the Cheshire Pride Community Project Award in 2008.

== See also ==
- Listed buildings in Rushton, Cheshire
