= Utkinton =

Village in Cheshire, England

Coordinates: 53.183333°N 2.683333°W

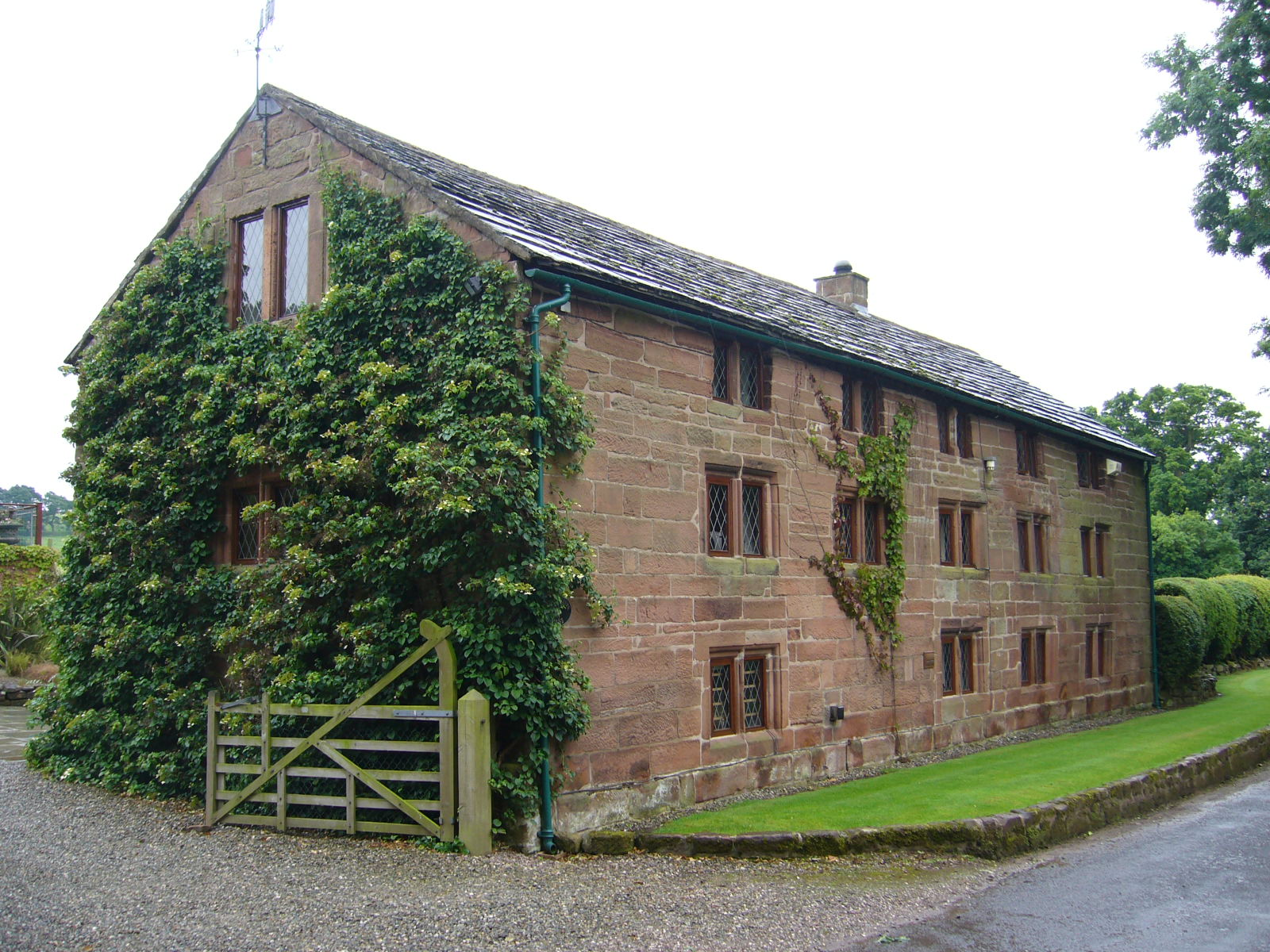
- Bailiff's House

- Location within Cheshire
- Population: 706 (2011 census)
- Civil parish: Utkinton and Cotebrook
- Unitary authority: Cheshire West and Chester
- Ceremonial county: Cheshire
- Region: North West
- Country: England
- Sovereign state: United Kingdom
- Post town: TARPORLEY
- Postcode district: CW6
- Dialling code: 01829
- Police: Cheshire
- Fire: Cheshire
- Ambulance: North West
- UK Parliament: Chester South and Eddisbury

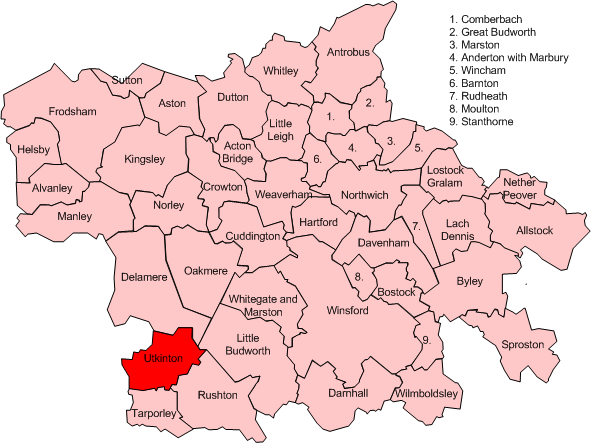
Map of civil parish of Utkinton within the former borough of Vale Royal

Utkinton is a village and former civil parish, now in the parishes of Utkinton and Cotebrook, in the unitary authority area of Cheshire West and Chester and the ceremonial county of Cheshire, England. It is approximately 2 miles (3.2 km) north of Tarporley, 8 miles (13 km) west of Winsford and 9 miles (14 km) east of Chester. The upper part of Utkinton is known as 'Quarry Bank'. Utkinton is at the heart of the local farming community. The area is also on the Sandstone Trail.

At the time of the 2001 census the population of the parish was 651, increasing to 706 by the 2011 census.

== History ==
The name means "Farm of Uttoc", deriving from the Old English tūn (a farmstead or settlement), ing (connected with) a person named Utta or Uttoc. It has been variously spelt over time, namely: Utkgnton, Hutkynton, Hudekintona and Utkyngton.

Utkinton was a township in Tarporley parish of Eddisbury Hundred, which became a civil parish in 1866. This was abolished on 1 April 2015 to form Utkinton and Cotebrook, with part also transferring to Tarporley civil parish. The population of the civil parish has been recorded as 458 in 1801, 500 in 1851, 463 in 1901 and 507 by 1951.

== Community ==
Agriculture remains the primary use of land in the civil parish, although there has been an expansion in housebuilding since the mid-twentieth century. Thirty new houses were constructed in North Brook Road during the 1970s - the largest development in Utkinton to date.

Amenities within the community include Utkinton St. Paul's Church of England Primary School and a village hall. Rose Farm is a mixed livestock farm, with an on-site shop, cafe and garden centre. The former Methodist Church had been converted into a private residence by 2015.

== Landmarks ==
Utkinton Hall is a designated Grade I listed building, constructed using sandstone, with the oldest parts of the structure dating back to medieval times.

The Bailiff's House is a three-storeyed seventeenth century building, also built with sandstone. It was extensively renovated in the late twentieth century and is a Grade II listed building.

A war memorial, consisting of a wooden calvary on a stone base in a small garden, is located in the east of the village at the junction of John Street and Quarry Bank. This commemorates the villagers who died fighting in World War I and World War II, which claimed seven servicemen and one serviceman from the village respectively. Several memorial services have taken place since its erection, many of which included children from the now closed primary school.

== See also ==
- Listed buildings in Utkinton
