= Listed buildings in Tiverton, Cheshire =

Tiverton is a former civil parish, now in the parishes of Tiverton and Tilstone Fearnall and Tarporley, in Cheshire West and Chester, England. It contains 20 buildings that are recorded in the National Heritage List for England as designated listed buildings. Of these, one is listed at Grade II*, the middle grade, and the others are at Grade II. The parish is rural, apart from the villages of Tiverton and Hand Green. The Shropshire Union Canal passes through the parish, and there are six listed structures associated with this. Otherwise the listed buildings are houses or farm buildings, some of which date from the 17th century or earlier and are timber-framed, a former Baptist chapel, and a telephone kiosk.

== Key ==
| Grade | Criteria |
|---|---|
| II* | Particularly important buildings of more than special interest |
| II | Buildings of national importance and special interest |

== Buildings ==
| Name and location | Photograph | Date | Notes | Grade |
|---|---|---|---|---|
| Brassey Green Hall; 53.14099°N 2.70389°W | | 1583 | A timber-framed farmhouse with wattle and daub and rendered brick infill. The roof is slated, and the house is in two storeys. It consists of a central range with projecting gabled wings on each side, the upper storeys and the gables being jettied. There is another timber-framed, gabled wing to the right. | II |
| Old Post Office Cottage; 53.14033°N 2.67271°W | | Early 17th century | The cottage roof was raised in the 20th century. It is partly timber-framed, partly in stone, all rendered, and has a thatched roof. There are two storeys. On the front are two doorways with thatched roofs, five casement windows on the ground floor, and two half-dormers above. On the back are two doors, two bay windows, and four full dormers. | II |
| Oak Cottage and Bank Farm Cottage; 53.13894°N 2.67200°W | | MId-17th century | A pair of semi-detached cottages originating as a single farmhouse and altered in the 19th century. The building is timber-framed with brick infill. It has two storeys and a symmetrical front containing two gables and casement windows with decorative glazing bars. On each side is a lean-to porch. Formerly listed as "The Green". | II |
| Barn, Brassey Green Hall; 53.14137°N 2.70446°W | | 17th century | The barn is timber-framed with brick infill on a stone plinth. It is roofed partly in slate and partly in corrugated asbestos. Attached to the east is a 19th-century brick hay barn. | II |
| Rose Cottage; 53.13827°N 2.67100°W | | 17th century | The house is timber-framed with brick and rendered infill, and with a thatched roof. It is in two storeys, and has a two-bay front. In the centre is a projecting timber-framed porch. The ground floor windows are casements, and in the upper floor are half-dormers. There are later extensions on both sides. | II |
| Yewtree Cottage; 53.13986°N 2.67165°W | | Late 17th century | A timber-framed cottage with plastered infill and a red asbestos tile roof. It is in a single storey with an attic, and has a two-bay front. To the east is a lean-to extension, and to the northwest is a 20th-century brick extension. The windows are casements. | II |
| Brassey Green Baptist Chapel; 53.14118°N 2.70823°W | | Early 18th century | The chapel, now disused, together with a vestry added later, is in red brick with Welsh slate roofs, and corner pilasters. The building has an L-shaped plan, and the doorways and windows have segmental brick arch lintels. Above the main entrance is an oculus, and the gables have timber bargeboards. | II |
| Four Lane Ends Farmhouse; 53.14607°N 2.66041°W | — | MId-18th century | A brick farmhouse with stone dressings and a slate roof. It is in two storeys with an attic, and has a symmetrical three-bay front. On the corners are chamfered stone quoins. In the centre is a projecting wooden gabled porch. The windows are casements. | II |
| Bate's Mill Bridge; 53.13742°N 2.70081°W | | c. 1767 | This is bridge No. 109 on the Shropshire Union Canal. It is a single-span bridge in whitewashed brick. It has a segmental arch and curved retaining walls. | II |
| Dale's Bridge; 53.13767°N 2.71118°W | | c. 1767 | This is bridge No. 110 on the Shropshire Union Canal. It is a single-span bridge in whitewashed brick. It has a segmental arch and curved retaining walls. | II |
| Lock adjacent to Bridge No 108; 53.13745°N 2.69171°W | | c. 1767 | This is a rectangular lock on the Shropshire Union Canal. It has brick walls and stone quoins. At each end is a pair of wooden double lock gates. | II |
| Wharton's Bridge; 53.13741°N 2.69207°W | | c. 1767 | This is bridge No. 108 on the Shropshire Union Canal. It is a single-span bridge in whitewashed brick. It has a segmental arch and curved retaining walls. | II |
| Beeston Stone Lock; 53.13221°N 2.66446°W | | c. 1772 | The lock on the Shropshire Union Canal is in ashlar sandstone. It is rectangular and has a pair of wooden gates at each end. | II |
| Hulgrave Hall and stable block 53.14189°N 2.69259°W | | Late 18th century | A house and stable block in brick with stone dressings and a slate roof. The house is in two storeys with a four-bay front. There is a near-central doorway flanked by windows. In the upper storey are four sash windows. The stable block has four doorways with wedge lintels. | II |
| Ivy Cottage; 53.13874°N 2.67159°W | — | Late 18th to early 19th century | A brick house with a pantile roof. It is in two storeys, and has a symmetrical two-bay front. Above the doorway is an open pediment. The windows are casements. | II |
| Beeston Iron Lock; 53.13432°N 2.66818°W | | 1828 | The lock on the Shropshire Union Canal was designed by Thomas Telford. It is unique in that its sides are lined with cast iron plates to hold back sand and marshland. The bottom gates are wooden; the upper gates are steel. Crossing the tail of the lock is an iron footbridge. The lock is also a scheduled monument. | II* |
| Linkman's hut 53.13201°N 2.66443°W | | Mid- to late 19th century | The hut is adjacent to Beeston Stone Lock. It is built in brick with stone dressings and a slate roof, and has a circular plan. The hut has a curved wooden door with a chamfered stone lintel, which is flanked by square windows. At the top of the hut is stone coping and a parapet. The hut has a domed roof with a central chimney pot. | II |
| Stocks Bank and Lilac Cottage; 53.13937°N 2.67203°W | | Mid- to late 19th century | A pair of semi-detached cottages with a tiled roof. The building is in two storeys and each cottage has a two-bay front. The central bays project forward and have a timber-framed gable. There are windows on each floor. The other bays contain a round headed doorway and windows in both floors. All the windows are casements, and all have decorative glazing bars. | II |
| War memorial 53.13918°N 2.67189°W | | 1920 | The war memorial is in sandstone and consists of a simple square obelisk rising from a pedimented plinth on a base of two steps. There are inscriptions on the obelisk, the plinth and on the base, with the names of those lost on the plinth. The memorial stands in a flagged enclosure surrounded by a kerb with railings and a gate. | II |
| Telephone kiosk 53.13928°N 2.67179°W | | 1935 | A K6 type telephone kiosk, designed by Giles Gilbert Scott. Constructed in cast iron with a square plan and a dome, it has three unperforated crowns in the top panels. | II |
