= Tarporley =

Village in Cheshire, England

Coordinates: 53.1602°N 2.6694°W

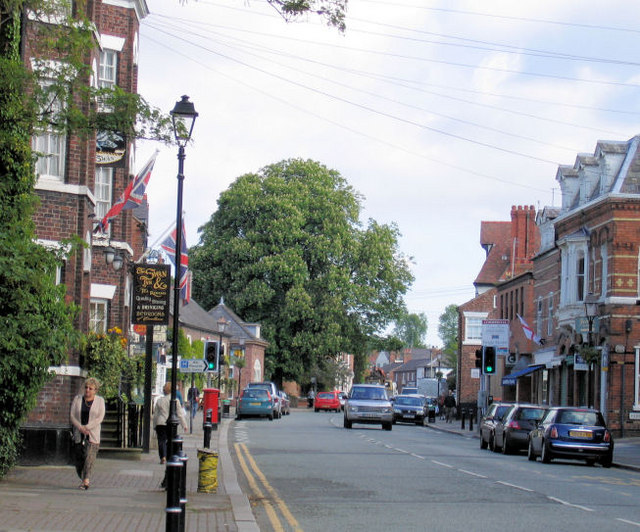
- High Street

- Location within Cheshire
- Population: 3,219 (2021 census)
- OS grid reference: SJ553627
- Civil parish: Tarporley
- Unitary authority: Cheshire West and Chester
- Ceremonial county: Cheshire
- Region: North West
- Country: England
- Sovereign state: United Kingdom
- Post town: TARPORLEY
- Postcode district: CW6
- Dialling code: 01829
- Police: Cheshire
- Fire: Cheshire
- Ambulance: North West
- UK Parliament: Chester South and Eddisbury

Tarporley is a large village and civil parish in Cheshire, England. The civil parish also contains the village of Rhuddall Heath. Tarporley is bypassed by the A49 and A51 roads.

At the 2011 census, the population was 2,614.

== History ==
Tarporley is near the site of a prehistoric settlement. Several prehistoric artefacts have been discovered within close proximity of the present-day village: a Neolithic stone axe, a flint scraper and a Bronze Age barbed and tanged arrow head.

It is listed in the Domesday Book as Torpelei, which has been translated as meaning “a pear wood near a hill called Torr”. For this reason, Tarporley Church of England Primary School has a pear tree for its emblem. However, the exact origins and meaning are unclear. The name has also been suggested to mean "a peasant's wood/clearing", derived from the Old English words þorpere (someone who lives at a thorp; a peasant) and lēah (a wood, forest, glade or clearing)

In 1066, the settlement was owned by Wulfgeat of Madeley and was worth one pound. Twenty years later, under the ownership of Gilbert the Hunter (Gilbert de Venables), Tarporley's value had halved, to ten shillings. This small agricultural settlement comprised eight households (four villagers, two smallholders and two slaves). The Domesday entry suggests that Tarporley was one of many townships still recovering from the devastation caused by the Normans' Harrying of the North in 1069–70.

== Governance ==
The parish council comprises 12 locally elected members.

An electoral ward of the same name exists. This ward stretches north-east to the Budworths with a total population at the 2011 census of 4,398.

=== Civic history ===
Tarporley was an ancient parish, appearing in the Domesday Book of 1086 in the hundred of Rushton, but by the late 12th century it had become part of Eddisbury Hundred. The parish included four townships, being Eaton, Rushton, Utkinton and a Tarporley township that covered the main settlement and adjoining areas. In 1863 the whole parish was declared to be a local government district, governed by a local board.

Such districts were reconstituted as urban districts in 1894. Tarporley Urban District Council met at the Public Hall on Forest Road (since demolished and replaced by a house called 37 Forest Road). The urban district was abolished in 1936, when the area was split into three rural parishes called Tarporley, Rushton and Utkinton within the Northwich Rural District. Northwich Rural District was abolished in 1974 under the Local Government Act 1972. From 1 April 1974 Tarporley formed part of the borough of Vale Royal, within Cheshire and was included in the new unitary authority of Cheshire West and Chester on 1 April 2009.

=== Political representation ===
Tarporley is part of the parliamentary constituency of Chester South and Eddisbury, represented since the 2024 general election by Aphra Brandreth of the Conservative Party. It was previously part of the Eddisbury constituency, which had been represented by Conservative Party MPs since its re-establishment in 1983, apart from a brief period in 2019 when the sitting MP Antoinette Sandbach had the Conservative whip removed and eventually sat as a Liberal Democrat before losing her seat to the Conservative Edward Timpson in the 2019 general election.

== Demography ==
Population of Tarporley since 1801
Year	1801	1851	1901	1951	2001	2011
Population	674	1,171	1,454	1,538	2,634	2,614

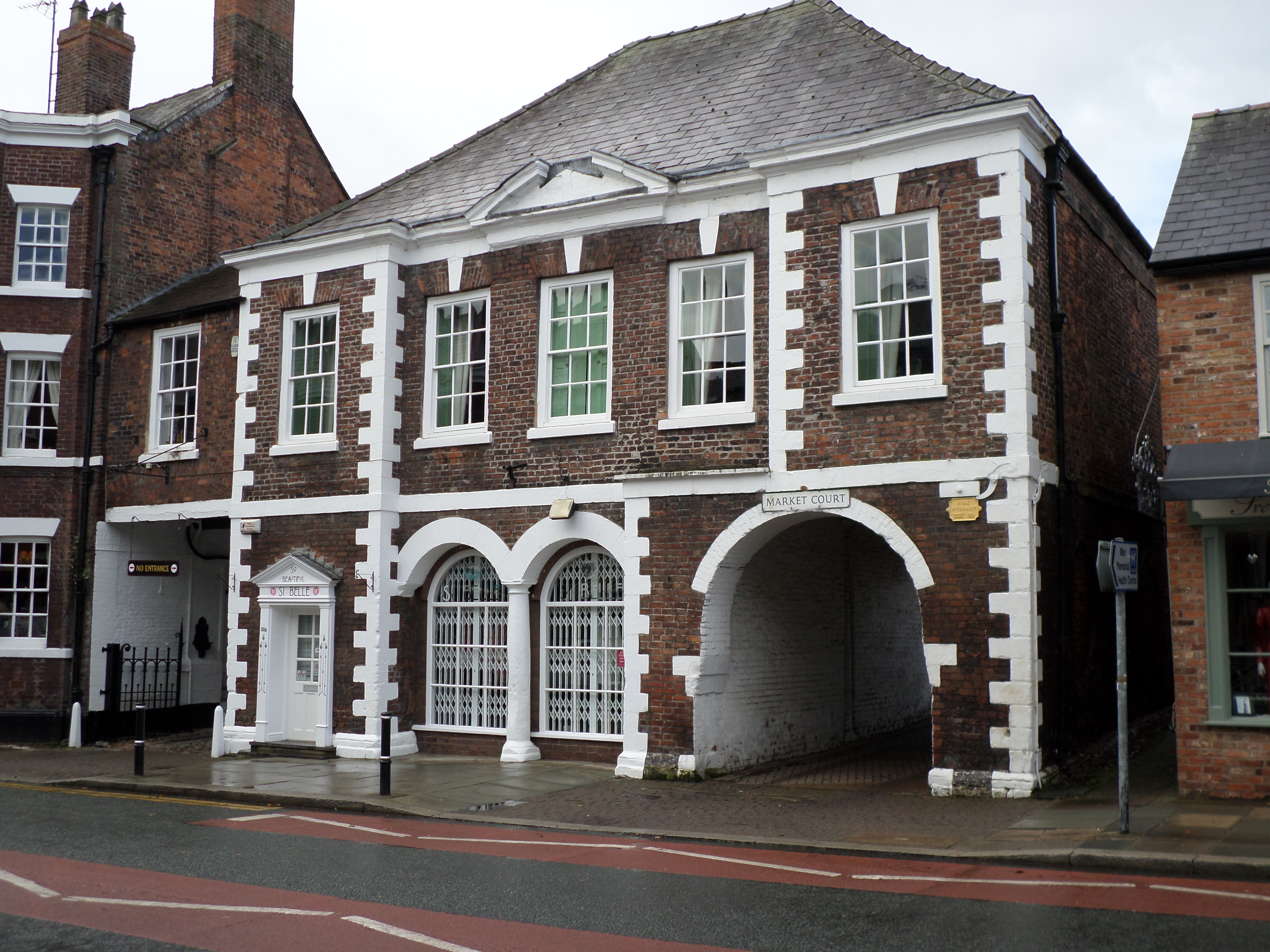
Tarporley Market Hall

== Geography and transport ==
Tarporley is bypassed by the A49 and A51 roads. The village was once served by Beeston Castle and Tarporley railway station on the North Wales Coast Line between Crewe and Chester, more than two miles from the village; the line remains open but the station closed in April 1966.

A local bus service, route 84, is provided by Stagecoach in Lancashire.

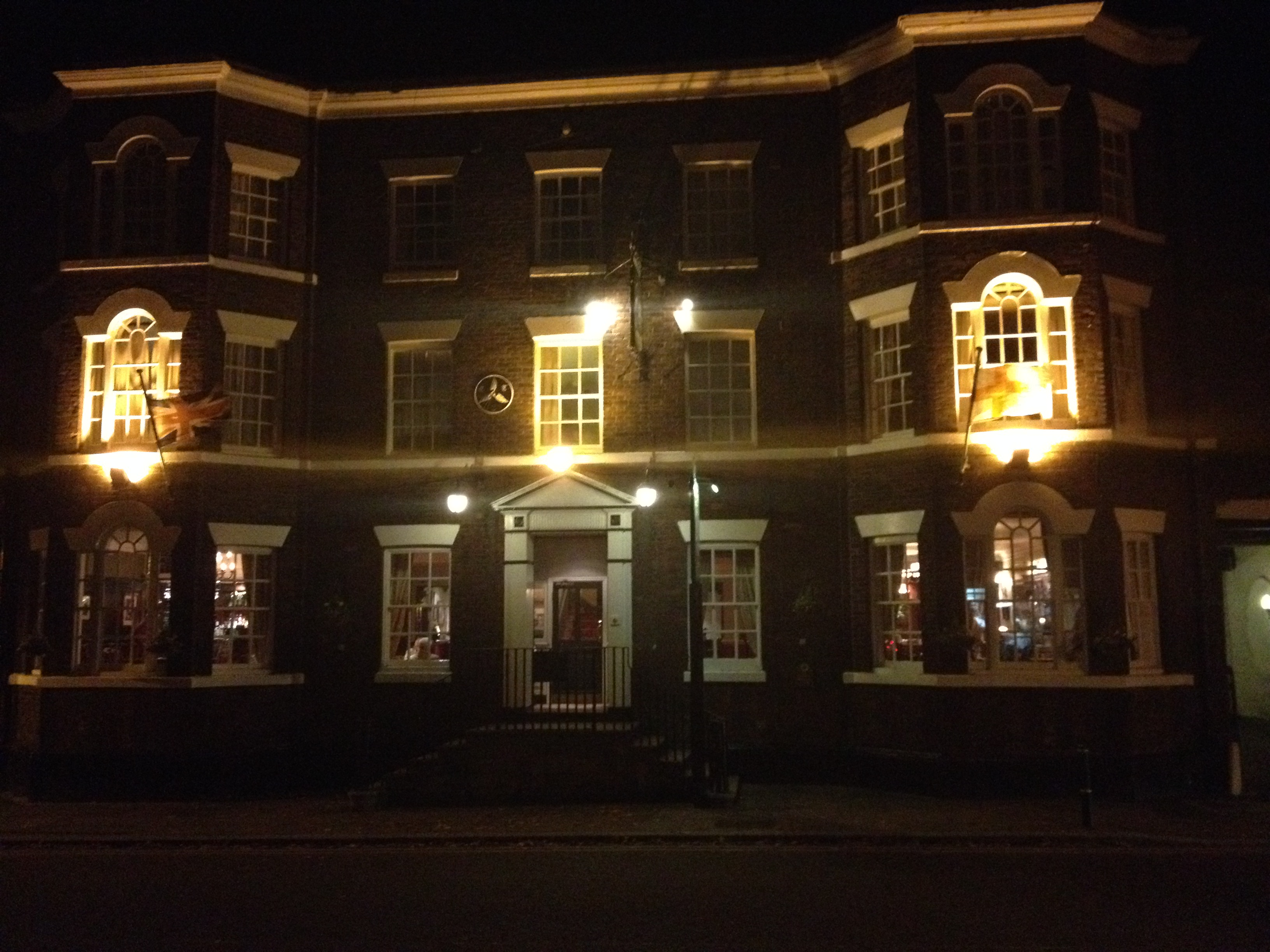
Swan Hotel, Tarporley

== Education ==
Tarporley has two schools: Tarporley High School and Tarporley Church of England Primary School.

Brook Farm School was a state special education boarding school located in the village that closed in 2001 and was demolished in 2013.

== Culture ==
Established in 1983, through The British Council, Tarporley is twinned with the Breton village of Bohars, near Brest, France.

Tarporley Hunt Club, the oldest surviving hunt club in England, meets in the village every Christmas.

== Notable people ==
- Maria Elizabetha Jacson (1755–1829), writer of books on botany, lived locally after 1787, when her father was local rector.
- Henry Shaw (1812–1887), taxidermist working in Shropshire, but born locally.
- Dominic Cotton (born 1960), trained and worked as an actor, now a London journalist.
- Tom Oliphant (born 1990), racing driver.
- Will Goodwin (born 2002), footballer who has played over 80 games in the English Football League.

== See also ==
- Listed buildings in Tarporley
- St Helen's Church, Tarporley
- Portal, Tarporley
