= Chester Rural District =

Former rural district of Cheshire, England

Coordinates: 53.191°N 2.8950°W

Chester
- Chester RD within Cheshire in 1970
- Area
  - 1911: 34,266 acres (138.67 km^{2})
  - 1961: 43,824 acres (177.35 km^{2})
- Population
  - 1901: 10,908
  - 1971: 34,686
- History
  - Origin: Sanitary district
  - Created: 1894
  - Abolished: 1974
  - Succeeded by: Chester
- Status: Rural district
- Government: Chester Rural District Council
- Subdivisions
  - Type: Civil parishes

Chester was a rural district of Cheshire, England, from 1894 to 1974. It was located near the city and county borough of Chester but did not include it. The district saw various boundary changes throughout its life. It included the small civil parish of Chester Castle, an exclave of the rural district within the boundaries of the county borough of Chester.

== Creation ==
The district was created by the Local Government Act 1894 as the successor to Chester Rural Sanitary District. It initially consisted of the following civil parishes:

- Bache
- Backford
- Blacon cum Crabwall
- Bridge Trafford
- Capenhurst
- Caughall
- Chester Castle
- Chorlton by Backford
- Christleton
- Claverton
- Croughton
- Dodleston
- Dunham on the Hill
- Eaton
- Eccleston
- Elton
- Great Boughton
- Great Saughall
- Great Stanney †
- Hapsford
- Hoole Village
- Ince ¶
- Lea by Backford
- Little Saughall
- Little Stanney
- Littleton
- Lower Kinnerton
- Marlston cum Lache
- Mickle Trafford
- Mollington Banastre ‡
- Mollington Tarrant ‡
- Moston
- Newton by Chester
- Picton
- Poulton
- Pulford
- Shotwick
- Shotwick Park
- Stanlow
- Stoke
- Thornton le Moors
- Upton by Chester
- Wervin
- Wimbolds Trafford
- Woodbank

‡ In 1901 the two parishes were merged to form a single civil parish of Mollington.

† In 1910 the parish of Great Stanney was removed from the rural district and became part of an enlarged Ellesmere Port and Whitby Urban District.

¶ In 1933 the parish of Ince and part of Thornton le Moors were added to an enlarged Ellesmere Port Urban district.

== 1936 boundary changes ==
In 1936 the boundaries of the rural district were substantially altered under a county review order:

- The County Borough of Chester and Hoole Urban District were extended to take in six parishes: Blacon cum Crabwall, Claverton, Great Boughton, Little Saughall, Marlston cum Lache, and Newton by Chester.
- The boundary with the neighbouring Tarvin Rural District was adjusted and nine parishes were added:

- Aldford
- Barrow
- Buerton
- Churton Heath
- Guilden Sutton
- Huntington
- Lea Newbold
- Rowton
- Saighton

== Further changes and abolition ==
In 1954 Hoole Urban District was abolished. The bulk of its area was added to the county borough of Chester, but 174 acres (0.70 km^{2}) were added to the rural district. There were exchanges of very small areas of land with neighbouring districts in 1963 due to the diversion of the River Gowy. The final change in the district's boundaries came in 1967, when 135 acres (0.55 km^{2}) passed to the Borough of Ellesmere Port.

The Local Government Act 1972 completely reorganised council boundaries throughout England and Wales. On 1 April 1974, Chester Rural District was merged with the city of Chester and Tarvin Rural District to form the new non-metropolitan district of Chester.
