= Listed buildings in Hoole Village =

Hoole Village is a former civil parish, now in the parishes of Mickle Trafford and District and Guilden Sutton, in Cheshire West and Chester, England. It contains four buildings that are recorded in the National Heritage List for England as designated listed buildings, all of which are at Grade II. This grade is the lowest of the three gradings given to listed buildings and is applied to "buildings of national importance and special interest". The parish is located to the northeast of Chester, and contains only one substantial structure, Hoole Hall. This is a listed building, together with two associated structures. The only other listed building is a pinfold.

Name and location	Photograph	Date	Notes
Hoole Hall; 53.2063°N 2.8549°W		c. 1760	Originating as a country house, it was extended in the 19th century. It is built in brick on a stone plinth with stone dressings, and has a slate roof. During the 20th century it was converted into a hotel. It has a rectangular plan, is in two storeys, and has a symmetrical five-bay west front. Above the central three bays is a triangular pediment containing a heraldic cartouche. There is a central Tuscan porch with a balustrade. The windows are sashes. On the south front is a canted two-storey bay window.
Pinfold; 53.21280°N 2.85058°W		Early 19th century (probable)	The pinfold was restored in about 1980. It is built in red sandstone blocks, with triangular coping. The pinfold has a rectangular plan with a gateway on the south side. On the top are some remaining iron spikes.
Conservatory, Hoole Hall; 53.20611°N 2.85478°W	—	Mid-19th century	The conservatory was added to the south of the hall for the Hamilton family. It is in cast iron and glass, with a hipped roof surmounted by spikelets. On the front is a nine-bay arcade of arches, the central three projecting forward.
Ha-ha wall and railings 53.20589°N 2.85543°W	—	Mid-19th century	The ha-ha was built for the Hamilton family. The wall is in sandstone, and surrounds three sides of a terrace. At the corners are squat square piers with capstones and the remains of plaster urns. The railings and posts are in iron.

== See also ==
- Listed buildings in Chester
- Listed buildings in Christleton
- Listed buildings in Great Boughton
- Listed buildings in Guilden Sutton
- Listed buildings in Mickle Trafford
- Listed buildings in Upton-by-Chester
