= Administrative counties of England =

Former subnational divisions of England

Administrative county (England)
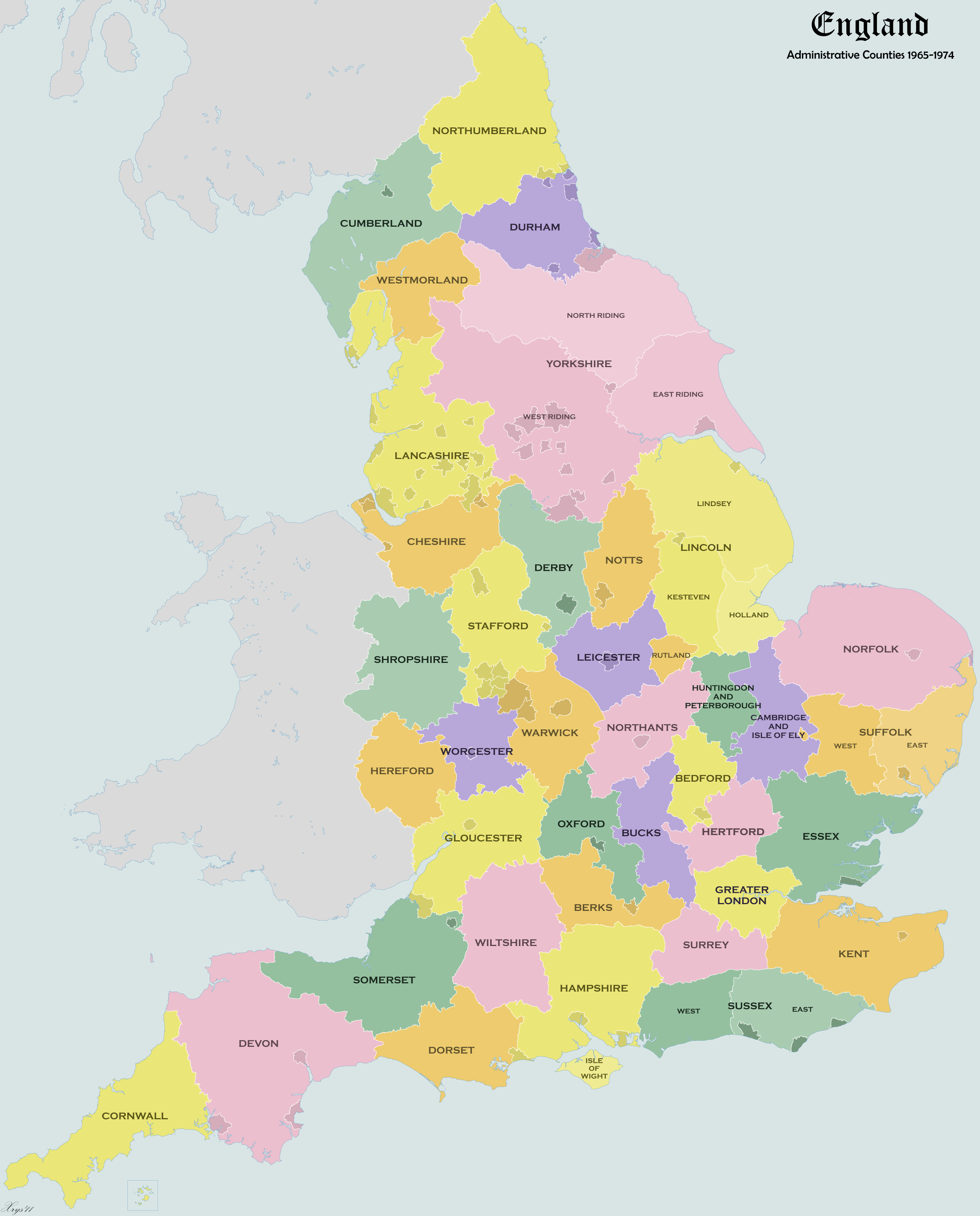
- The administrative counties as they were when abolished in 1974
- Category: Administrative county
- Location: England
- Found in: County
- Created by: Local Government Act 1888
- Created: 1889
- Abolished by: Local Government Act 1972
- Abolished: 1974
- Populations: 25,000–4.2 million
- Government: County council
- Subdivisions: Rural district; Urban district; Municipal borough

Administrative counties were subnational divisions of England used for local government from 1889 to 1974. They were created by the Local Government Act 1888 (51 & 52 Vict. c. 41), which established an elected county council for each area. Some geographically large historic counties were divided into several administrative counties, each with its own county council. The administrative counties operated until 1974, when they were replaced by a system of metropolitan and non-metropolitan counties under the Local Government Act 1972.

== History ==
=== Introduction of county councils ===
In 1888 the government, led by the Tory prime minister Lord Salisbury established county councils throughout England and Wales, covering areas known as administrative counties. Many larger towns and cities were given the status of county borough, with similar powers and independent of county council control. Under the Act, each county borough was an "administrative county of itself".

Cambridgeshire, Lincolnshire, Northamptonshire, Suffolk, Sussex, and Yorkshire were split up for administrative purposes, following historical divisions used by the Courts of Quarter Sessions.

Additionally there was a County of London which covered the area today known as Inner London. The Isle of Wight was previously administered as part of Hampshire but became its own administrative county in 1890.

In 1894 a uniform two-tier system was established outside the county boroughs and London, with subdivisions of the administrative counties called urban districts, rural districts and municipal boroughs. The structure was complete once the County of London was divided into metropolitan boroughs in 1900.

Most exclaves of counties were eliminated under the Counties (Detached Parts) Act 1844, but in 1894 county councils were given the power to adjust county boundaries, and most of the remaining anomalies were removed in the next few years. For example, the Measham area of Derbyshire was transferred to Leicestershire in 1897.

=== Map 1890–1965 ===
The map shows the counties and the county boroughs. When a county borough expanded into territory of a county that was not the one it came from, maps sometimes showed this as an increase in size of the county which the county borough was associated with.

Monmouthshire, not shown on the map, was reckoned for some legal purposes among the English counties for most of this period.

The 1888 Act did not contain a list of administrative counties: it was not until 1933 and the passing of a new Local Government Act that they were enumerated in the Act's schedule. Unlike the 1888 Act, the 1933 Act did not include county boroughs as administrative counties.

In legislation and formal documents the suffix "shire" was generally not used: for example, Bedfordshire was referred to as "the administrative county of Bedford" and the Northamptonshire council as the "county council of Northampton". In the case of Lancashire and Cheshire the councils were officially the "county council of the palatine county". Shropshire was always officially entitled the "county of Salop". The right of Berkshire to be described as a "royal county" was recognised by the monarch in 1958. On 1 April 1959 the administrative county of Southampton was renamed as Hampshire.

This system was the basis of the ceremonial counties used for Lieutenancy – except that Cambridgeshire, Hampshire, Lincolnshire, Northamptonshire, Suffolk and Sussex were not split for Lieutenancy. (Yorkshire, however, was).

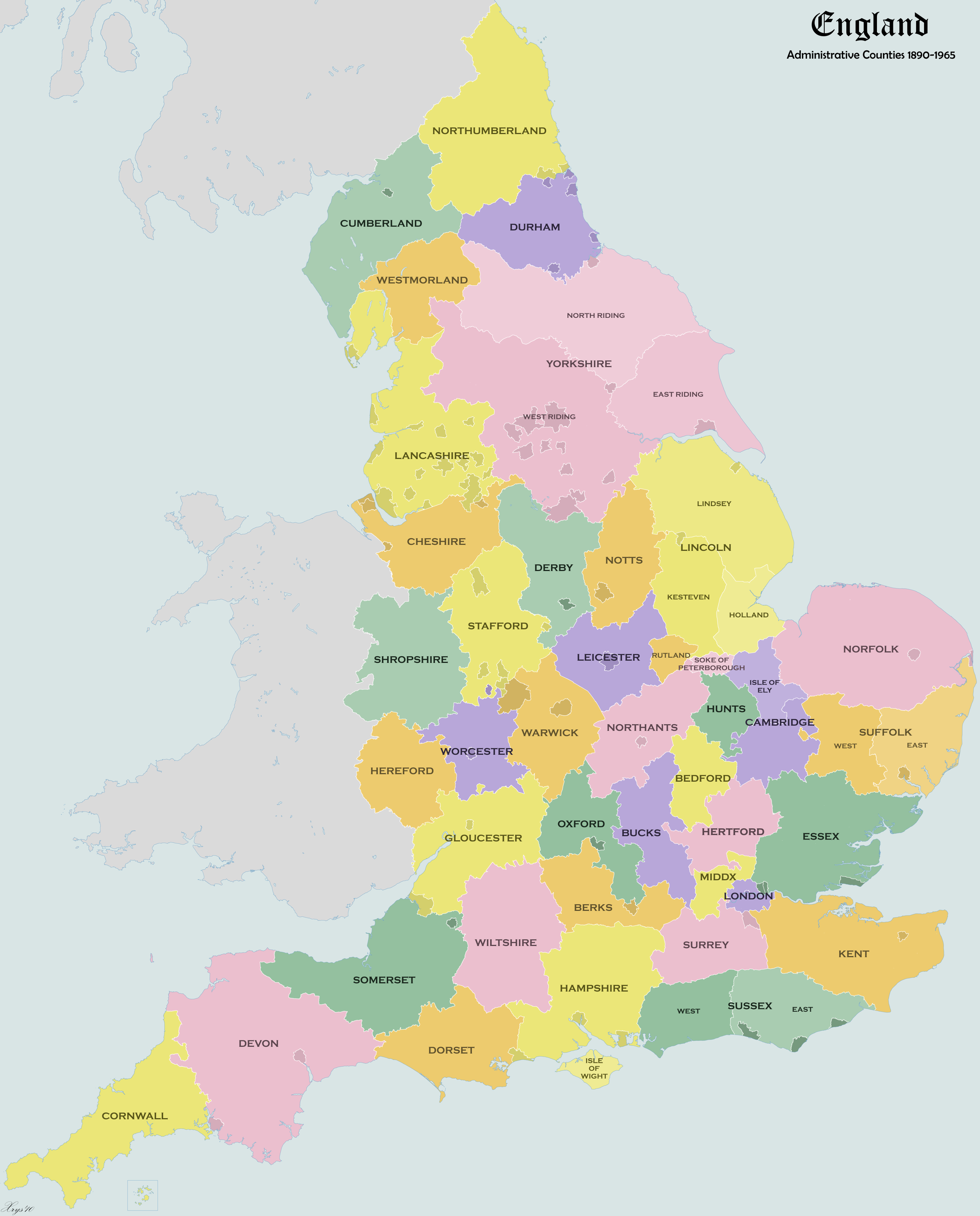
England – Administrative Counties 1890–1965

=== Area and population ===
The table lists the area and population of each administrative county at the censuses of 1891 and 1961.

Several county councils had administrative headquarters outside of their area. This was usually because the traditional county town was a county borough. The headquarters of Derbyshire, Leicestershire and Nottinghamshire county councils were moved from the county boroughs to locations within their respective administrative counties.

Ceremonial County	Administrative County	Area (statute acres) 1891	Population 1891	Area (statute acres) 1961	Population 1961	Headquarters
Bedfordshire	Bedfordshire	298,494	160,704	302,940	380,837	Bedford
Berkshire	Berkshire	455,864	176,109	454,726	385,017	Reading^{†}
Buckinghamshire	Buckinghamshire	475,694	185,284	479,405	488,233	Aylesbury
Cambridgeshire	Cambridgeshire	310,306	121,961	315,166	190,384	Cambridge
Cambridgeshire	Isle of Ely	239,259	63,861	239,951	89,180	March
Cheshire	Cheshire	646,627	536,644	621,884	475,313	Chester ^{(1)}
Cornwall	Cornwall	868,208	322,571	868,260	342,301	Truro
County Durham	County Durham	639,436	721,461	620,278	951,956	Durham
Cumberland	Cumberland	970,161	266,549	967,054	223,202	Carlisle^{†}^{(2)}
Derbyshire	Derbyshire	654,100	426,768	635,459	745,212	Derby^{†} until 1958, Matlock thereafter
Devon	Devon	1,661,914	455,353	1,649,434	539,021	Exeter^{†}^{(3)}
Dorset	Dorset	632,272	194,517	633,745	313,460	Dorchester
Essex	Essex	980,839	579,355	959,755	1,859,916	Chelmsford
Gloucestershire	Gloucestershire	790,833	384,552	773,295	494,885	Gloucester^{†}
Hampshire	Hampshire	938,098	386,849	929,951	762,599	Winchester
Hampshire	Isle of Wight	93,342	78,672	94,142	95,752	Newport
Herefordshire	Herefordshire	537,363	115,949	538,924	130,928	Hereford
Hertfordshire	Hertfordshire	406,932	224,550	404,525	832,901	Hertford
Huntingdonshire	Huntingdonshire	233,928	54,969	233,985	79,924	Huntingdon
Kent	Kent	971,849	785,674	971,125	1,671,436	Maidstone
Lancashire	Lancashire	1,124,450	1,768,278	1,060,804	2,280,359	Preston^{†}
Leicestershire	Leicestershire	520,400	200,468	515,404	409,098	Leicester^{†} until 1967, Glenfield thereafter
Lincolnshire	Parts of Holland	255,252	75,522	267,847	103,327	Boston
Lincolnshire	Parts of Kesteven	471,749	105,910	462,100	134,842	Sleaford
Lincolnshire	Parts of Lindsey	961,327	199,095	961,038	505,427	Lincoln^{†}
London	London	75,442	4,232,118	74,903	3,200,484	Spring Gardens until 1933, Lambeth thereafter
Middlesex	Middlesex	149,046	560,012	148,691	2,234,543	Westminster^{‡}
Monmouthshire	Monmouthshire	342,548	203,347	339,008	336,566	Newport^{†}^{(4)}
Norfolk	Norfolk	1,303,967	317,983	1,302,505	388,005	Norwich^{†}
Northamptonshire	Northamptonshire	584,759	203,247	578,947	292,584	Northampton^{†}
Northamptonshire	Soke of Peterborough	53,471	35,249	53,465	74,758	Peterborough
Northumberland	Northumberland	1,284,385	319,730	1,276,266	481,474	Morpeth^{(5)}
Nottinghamshire	Nottinghamshire	528,817	231,946	521,647	591,089	Nottingham^{†} until 1959, West Bridgford thereafter
Oxfordshire	Oxfordshire	480,608	145,149	470,390	203,161	Oxford^{†}
Rutland	Rutland	97,273	20,659	97,273	23,504	Oakham
Shropshire	Shropshire	859,516	236,339	861,800	297,466	Shrewsbury
Somerset	Somerset	1,039,106	386,866	1,026,043	518,145	Taunton
Staffordshire	Staffordshire	731,089	818,290	685,250	983,758	Stafford
Suffolk	East Suffolk	549,744	183,478	547,397	219,759	Ipswich^{†}
Suffolk	West Suffolk	389,870	120,952	390,915	128,918	Bury St Edmunds
Surrey	Surrey	452,218	418,856	449,160	1,478,841	Newington^{‡}, moved to Kingston upon Thames in 1893 ^{(6)}
Sussex	East Sussex	525,904	240,264	494,580	375,349	Lewes
Sussex	West Sussex	389,870	120,952	405,351	411,613	Chichester
Warwickshire	Warwickshire	562,797	307,193	558,684	612,768	Warwick
Westmorland	Westmorland	500,906	66,098	504,917	67,180	Kendal
Wiltshire	Wiltshire	880,248	264,997	860,607	422,985	Trowbridge
Worcestershire	Worcestershire	473,542	296,661	514,341	441,069	Worcester^{†}
Yorkshire	East Riding of Yorkshire	741,827	141,516	735,963	224,031	Beverley
Yorkshire	North Riding of Yorkshire	1,358,101	284,837	1,376,607	396,707	Northallerton
Yorkshire	West Riding of Yorkshire	1,701,386	1,351,570	1,606,921	1,678,010	Wakefield^{†}^{(7)}

^† County borough, outside the administrative county
^‡ In the administrative county of London
^(1) Chester Castle, in which County Hall is situated, was a civil parish and exclave of the Chester Rural District and thus an exclave of the administrative county and an enclave in the county borough.
^(2) County borough from 1914
^(3) Devon County Buildings Area transferred from the county borough to the administrative county of Devon (of which it formed an exclave) in 1963
^(4) County borough from 1891
^(5) Moot Hall Precincts were an exclave of the administrative county within the county borough of Newcastle upon tyne
^(6) The decision to move the county council headquarters was made on 15 April 1890, and the new county hall opened 14 November 1893. Kingston was removed from the administrative county of Surrey in 1965, becoming part of the Royal Borough of Kingston upon Thames in Greater London
^(7) County borough from 1915

Structure of subnational entities in England 1899–1965
County level	Administrative county	Administrative county	County borough	County of London
District level	Rural district	Urban district or Municipal borough	n/a	Metropolitan Borough
Parish level	Civil parish	n/a	n/a	n/a

=== Alterations in boundaries ===
The boundaries of the administrative counties changed considerably over time. The reasons for this were threefold: the growth of towns on either side of an existing boundary, the creation and extension of county boroughs and the elimination of outlying exclaves and other anomalies.

As urbanisation increased, and suburbs were built on a scale not seen before, the urban areas surrounding various towns and cities started to cross traditional county borders. The Local Government Act 1888 (51 & 52 Vict. c. 41) provided that in the case that an urban sanitary district crossed a county border, the entire district would be considered part of the county in which the larger part was. This condition was maintained with the expansion of urban districts and municipal boroughs.

Towns that were split by historic borders and were unified in one administrative county include Banbury, Mossley, Tamworth, Todmorden.

Urban districts to annexe areas in another counties include:

- Little Bowden in Northamptonshire, annexed by Market Harborough, Leicestershire
- Mellor and Ludworth, in Derbyshire, annexed by Marple in Cheshire (and now in Greater Manchester)

Additionally, the territory and population of administrative counties was reduced by the increasing numbers of county boroughs, and extensions thereof. This was recognised as a problem, and the process of creation and enlargement of such boroughs was made more difficult by the Local Government (County Boroughs and Adjustments) Act 1926. By June 1970 25% of the population were within the county boroughs.

On creation, many of the administrative counties had a number of exclaves. During the 1890s most of these were eliminated, with parishes being exchanged between counties. The boundaries of Gloucestershire, Worcestershire and Wiltshire contained numerous enclaves and exclaves, and were realigned in 1931.

=== Greater London ===
Throughout the next century, debates took place about what should be done about local government in respect of the increasing urbanisation of the country. Proposals to expand or change county boroughs or to create larger urban counties were discussed, but nothing happened until 1963, when legislation was passed to come into effect in 1965.

The County of London was abolished, and replaced by Greater London, a sui generis council area, taking the three of the surrounding county boroughs, more of Surrey and Kent, parts of Essex and Hertfordshire and consuming nearly all of Middlesex – the remaining parts being ceded to Surrey and Hertfordshire. Some other changes took place, such as the Soke of Peterborough and Huntingdonshire being merged into Huntingdon and Peterborough, and the merger of the original Cambridgeshire with the Isle of Ely to form Cambridgeshire and Isle of Ely.

=== Map 1965–1974 ===
The map shows the counties and county boroughs just prior to their abolition in 1974.

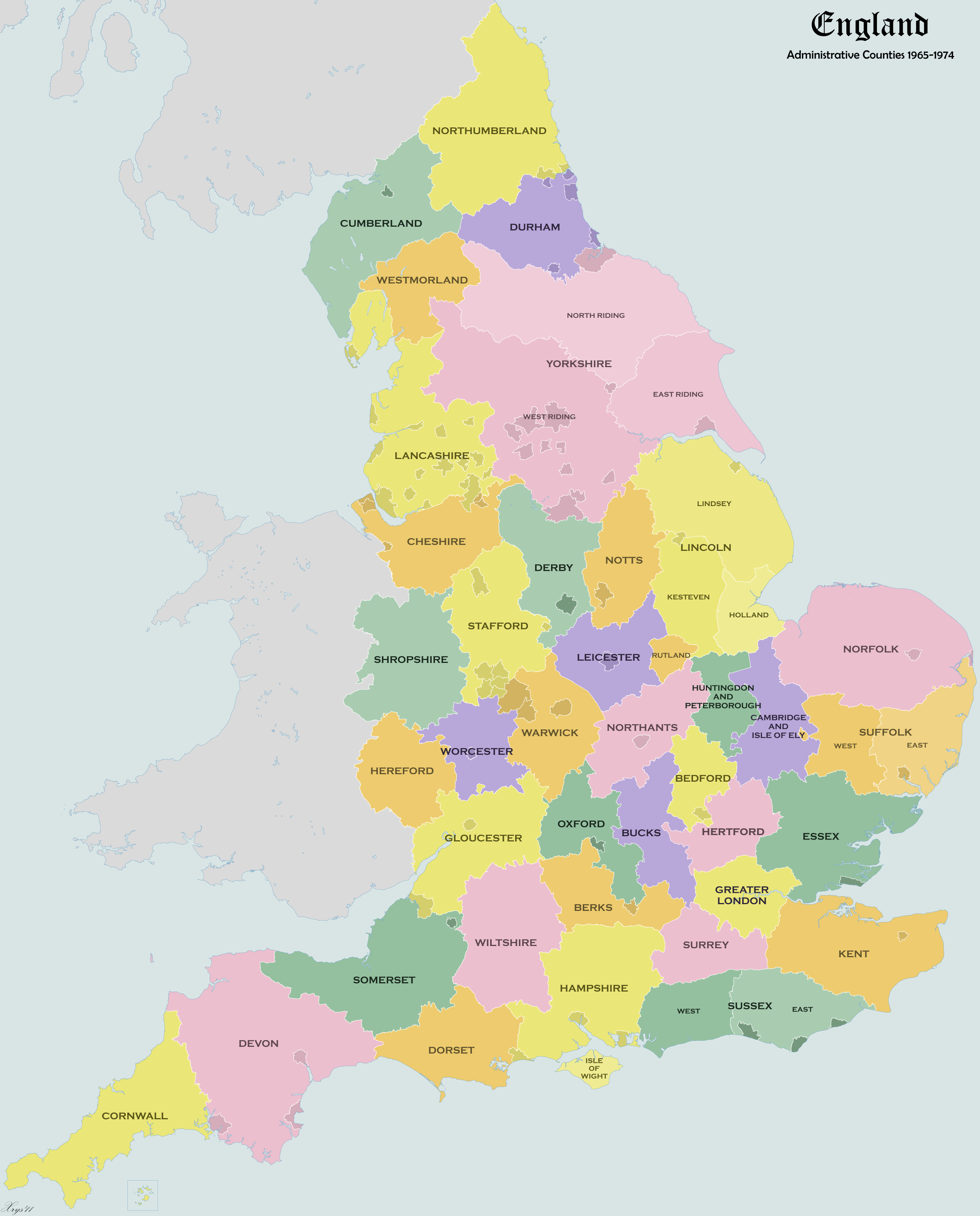
England – Administrative Counties 1965–1974

== Abolition ==
In 1974 the administrative counties were abolished by the Local Government Act 1972 and replaced with the metropolitan and non-metropolitan counties of England.

== See also ==
- Administrative counties of Ireland
- List of articles about local government in the United Kingdom
- Postal counties of the United Kingdom
