= Hoole Village =

Hamlet in Cheshire, England

Coordinates: 53.207°N 2.850°W

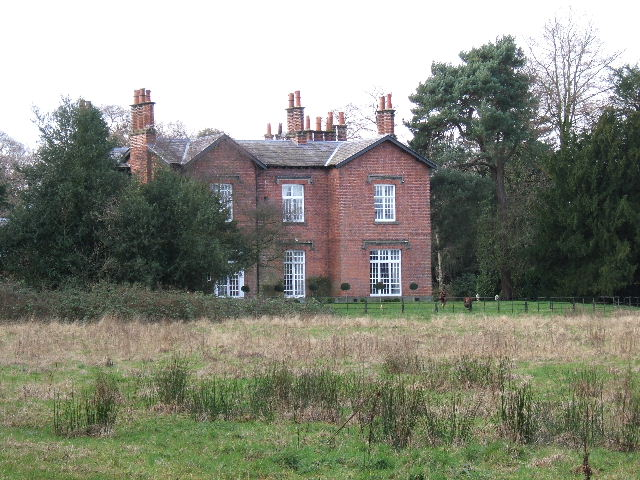
- Mayfield House, Hoole Village

- Location within Cheshire
- Population: 319 (2011 census)
- OS grid reference: SJ432681
- Civil parish: Mickle Trafford and District; Guilden Sutton
- Unitary authority: Cheshire West and Chester
- Ceremonial county: Cheshire
- Region: North West
- Country: England
- Sovereign state: United Kingdom
- Post town: CHESTER
- Postcode district: CH2
- Dialling code: 01244
- Police: Cheshire
- Fire: Cheshire
- Ambulance: North West
- UK Parliament: Runcorn and Helsby

Hoole Village is a hamlet in the parish of Mickle Trafford and District, in Cheshire West and Chester, Cheshire, England. It lies 2 miles (3.2 km) north-east of the centre of Chester, and is just outside the urban area. From 1894 to 2015, Hoole Village was the name of a civil parish, created when the old parish of Hoole was split into two parishes: an urban parish to the south-west adjoining Chester, which retained the name Hoole, and a rural parish to the north-east which was given the name Hoole Village.

== Geography ==
The former Hoole Village parish contained the southern end of the M53 motorway where it becomes the A55 road and is crossed by the A56 road. This junction is known as Hoole Island Junction. The parish also included Hoole Hall, which is now a hotel.

In 2004 the population was 230, rising to 319 at the time of the 2011 census.

== History ==
In September 1955 a prehistoric arrowhead and a worked flake were found in a garden in the parish. The arrowhead was dated to the period between the Early Bronze Age and the Early Iron Age (2350 BC to 701 BC). In 1995 aerial photography showed evidence of a Roman practice fort near to Hoole Hall. It is believed that the Roman road from Chester to Wilderspool (now part of Warrington) passed through the parish.

== Governance ==
There are two tiers of local government covering Hoole Village, at parish and unitary authority level: Mickle Trafford and District Parish Council, and Cheshire West and Chester Council. The parish council generally meets at the village hall in Mickle Trafford.

=== Administrative history ===
Hoole was historically a township which was mostly in the ancient parish of Plemstall, which formed part of the Broxton Hundred of Cheshire. (Note: A small part of the township in its southernmost corner comprised part of the parish of St John the Baptist, Chester, but lay outside the city's municipal boundaries.) From the 17th century onwards, parishes were gradually given various civil functions under the poor laws, in addition to their original ecclesiastical functions. In some cases, including Hoole, the civil functions were exercised by the township rather than the wider parishes. In 1866, the legal definition of 'parish' was changed to be the areas used for administering the poor laws, and so Hoole became a civil parish.

In 1864, a Hoole local government district was created. Its promoters initially sought to have the whole township included in the district, but objections from ratepayers in the more rural north-eastern part of the township led to the district covering only the south-western part of the township. Local government districts were reconstituted as urban districts under the Local Government Act 1894. The 1894 Act also directed that civil parishes could no longer straddle district boundaries, and so the parish of Hoole was reduced to match the urban district, and the rural part of the old parish outside the urban district was made a separate parish, which Cheshire County Council chose to name Hoole Village.

The boundary between Hoole and Hoole Village was changed in 1936 and again in 1954, when Hoole was absorbed into the city of Chester, subject to a realignment of the boundary with Hoole Village to follow the A41 road.

Hoole Village was too small to have a parish council, having a parish meeting instead. In 1960, the parish was placed under a grouped parish council with Bridge Trafford and Mickle Trafford, called the Mickle Trafford and District Parish Council. In 1972, the group of parishes was enlarged to also include Picton and Wimbolds Trafford. On 1 April 2015 the five parishes within the group were merged into a single civil parish called Mickle Trafford and District, subject to some minor adjustments to boundaries with neighbouring parishes.

== Landmarks and places of interest ==
Hoole Hall was built as a large house around 1720. The hall itself, its attached conservatory built in the mid 19th century, and the ha-ha wall and railings of the west terrace of the house are Grade II listed buildings. The hall is now used as a hotel. Also listed Grade II is a restored pinfold in Oak Lane.

== See also ==
- Listed buildings in Hoole Village
