= Dunham Hill =

Dunham Hill may refer to:

- Dunham Hill (Huntington, Texas), listed on the NRHP in Texas, in the U.S.
- Dunham on the Hill, Cheshire, in England
- Dunham Hill railway station, formerly at Dunham-on-the-Hill
