= Plemstall =

Hamlet in Cheshire, England

Coordinates: 53.2249°N 2.8148°W

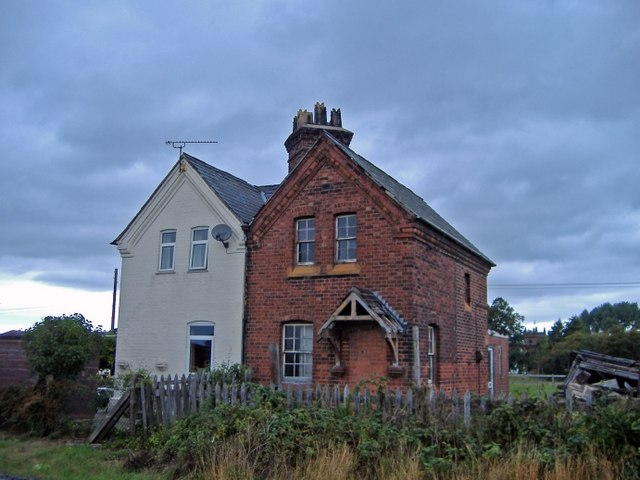
Plemstall Crossing

Plemstall (formerly Plemonstall) is a hamlet in the civil parish of Mickle Trafford and District, in Cheshire West and Chester, Cheshire, England. It lies north-east of the village of Mickle Trafford.

== Geography ==
St Peter's Church

The hamlet contains only a couple of houses, being a farm and former level crossing keeper's house, in addition to the Grade I listed St Peter's Church. The church stands on a slightly elevated area which was known as "The Isle of Chester", the surrounding area formerly being marsh. The church is believed to have been built on the site of Plegmund's hermitage, who is believed to have lived in there before he became Archbishop of Canterbury in AD 890.

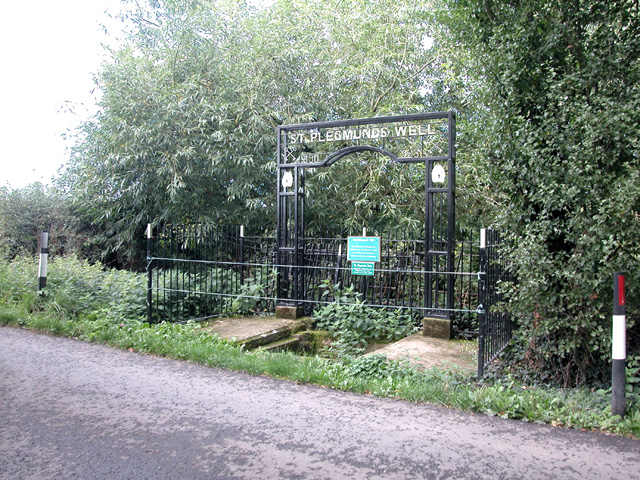
St Plegmund's well

St Plegmund's well is also situated within the hamlet, on the edge of a low cliff about 220 yards (201 m) to the west of the church and to the east of one of the channels of the River Gowy. It is one of two holy wells in west Cheshire.

== Governance ==
There are two tiers of local government covering Plemstall, at parish and unitary authority level: Mickle Trafford and District Parish Council, and Cheshire West and Chester Council. The parish council generally meets at the village hall in Mickle Trafford.

=== Administrative history ===
Plemstall was an ancient parish, and formed part of the Broxton Hundred of Cheshire. The parish was subdivided into the four townships of Bridge Trafford, Hoole, Mickle Trafford, and Picton. Plemstall's parish church of St Peter was in the Mickle Trafford township. From the 17th century onwards, parishes were gradually given various civil functions under the poor laws, in addition to their original ecclesiastical functions. In some cases, including Plemstall, the civil functions were exercised by each township separately rather than the parish as a whole. In 1866, the legal definition of 'parish' was changed to be the areas used for administering the poor laws, and so the four townships each became a separate civil parish, whilst remaining part of the ecclesiastical parish of Plemstall. The ecclesiastical parish retains the name Plemstall.
