= Listed buildings in Mickle Trafford =

Mickle Trafford is a former civil parish, now in the parish of Mickle Trafford and District, in Cheshire West and Chester, England. It contains eleven buildings that are recorded in the National Heritage List for England as designated listed buildings. Of these, one is listed at Grade I, the highest grade, one is listed at Grade II*, the middle grade, and the others are at Grade II. Apart from the village of Mickle Trafford, the parish is rural. In addition to houses and buildings related to farming, the listed buildings include a medieval church and associated structures, an inscribed stone, and a corn mill.

== Key ==
Grade	Criteria
I	Buildings of exceptional interest, sometimes considered to be internationally important.
II*	Particularly important buildings of more than special interest.
II	Buildings of national importance and special interest.

== Buildings ==
Name and location	Photograph	Date	Notes	Grade
St Peter's Church, Plemstall; 53.2251°N 2.8147°W		15th century	The church stands in an isolated position, and is built in sandstone with slate roofs. It is in Perpendicular style. The tower, with its embattled parapet, and crocketed finials, was added in 1826. The church consists of a nave and chancel in one range, a north aisle, a south porch, and a west tower. Many of the furnishings inside the church were carved by a former incumbent.	I
Mickle Trafford Manor; 53.2199°N 2.8344°W	—	Late 16th to early 17th century	The house is basically timber-framed on a stone plinth, with later additions and alterations. The exterior has been stuccoed, and there is a Welsh slate roof. It has two parallel ranges, is in two storeys, and has a four-bay front. There are three gables with pierced bargeboards, and the windows are casements. On the left side is a canted bay window.	II
Windsor Lodge; 53.2209°N 2.8337°W	—	Early 17th century	A timber-framed house, later stuccoed, and extended. It has a sandstone plinth, and Welsh slate roofs. The house is in two storeys, and has a five-bay east front. The windows are a mixture of casements and sashes. Inside the house, the timber-framing is almost complete.	II
Hurleston memorial, St Peter's Church; 53.22504°N 2.81444°W		c. 1670	This consists of a vault, a tombchest, and a memorial plaque in Baroque style. The vault cover is carved with a pair of skeletons, scrolls, and crossed palm fronds.	II*
Ivy Bank Farmhouse; 53.2205°N 2.8337°W	—	Early 18th century	The farmhouse was extended to the rear in the 19th century. It is built in brick with Welsh slate roofs, and has a double-pile plan. It is in two storeys with a blind attic, and has a symmetrical three-bay front. The windows are casements.	II
Farm building, Ivy Bank Farm; 53.2205°N 2.8333°W	—	Early 18th century	Alterations were made later. The farm building is in brick with a Welsh slate roof, and has an L-shaped plan. Its features include various openings, pitch holes, ventilation slots, and external steps.	II
Sundial, St Peter's Church; 53.22495°N 2.81434°W		1730	The sundial is in sandstone. It has a circular base, a bulbous baluster, and a moulded square capstone. On the top is a bronze plate inscribed with the names of the churchwardens and the date, and a gnomon.	II
Cenotaph, St Peter's Church; 53.22500°N 2.81454°W		1795	Built in sandstone, the pedestal has a panel on each side, that on the north side bearing an inscription. It carries a rectangular capstone with fluted sides and a concave top with a finial.	II
Churchyard wall and gate, St Peter's Church; 53.22513°N 2.81497°W		Early 19th century	The wall is in sandstone, and has a chamfered coping. In the centre is a gateway approached by a ramp and two steps. The gate piers have a square plan and pyramidal caps. The gates are in wrought iron, and against the wall is a stone mounting block.	II
Inscribed stone 53.22516°N 2.81974°W		Early 19th century	A large red sandstone stone inscribed on one side "MICKLE TRAFFORD CART-ROAD ONLY" and on the other "Parish CART-ROAD FOOTPATH". It was probably intended to prevent illegal droving and carting to avoid the toll road.	II
Trafford Mill; 53.2292°N 2.8255°W		c. 1830	A mill has existed on the site by the River Gowy since the 14th century. The present water-powered corn mill ceased working in 1952. is built in brick with a Welsh slate roof. It has a long L-shaped plan, is in two storeys, and has a 12-bay west front. Its machinery is still present, and it is planned to make it into a working museum.	II

== See also ==
- Listed buildings in Backford
- Listed buildings in Barrow
- Listed buildings in Dunham-on-the-Hill
- Listed buildings in Guilden Sutton
- Listed buildings in Hoole Village
- Listed buildings in Thornton-le-Moors
- Listed buildings in Upton-by-Chester
- Listed buildings in Wervin
- Listed buildings in Wimbolds Trafford
