= Trafford Hall =

Country house in Cheshire, England

Coordinates: 53.2436°N 2.82°W

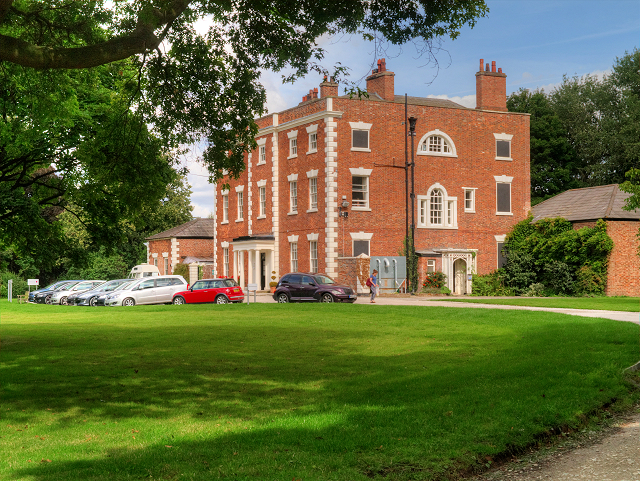
Trafford Hall

Trafford Hall is an 18th-century country house standing to the east of the village of Wimbolds Trafford in Cheshire, England, about 4½ miles (7 km) northeast of the city of Chester. It is owned by The Regenda Group and operated as a youth hostel and training centre by the Youth Hostels Association.

== The house and grounds ==
Trafford Hall was built in 1756 for George Edward Gerrard. The house is constructed in brick with stone dressings and slate roofs. Its architectural style is Georgian. It has 2½ storeys and five bays on the entrance front. To the left of the main block is a single-storey pavilion joined to the house by a service wing. To the right, and set back, is the ballroom, added in the 19th century. The central bay of the main block projects slightly forward, and has rusticated quoins at the corners. There are similar quoins at the corner of the house. In the central bay is a porch supported by four Doric columns. All the windows on the entrance front are sashes. On the right side of the house is a Venetian window in the second story, with a diocletian window above. The interior contains a "fine staircase" with twisted balusters. The house is recorded in the National Heritage List for England as a Grade II* listed building and has 14 acres of grounds including gardens, fields and woodland.

== Owners ==
=== George Edward Gerrard ===
George Edward Gerrard built Trafford Hall in 1756. He came from a family who had owned land in Wimbolds Trafford for over a century. He was born in 1723, and in 1750 married Elizabeth Johnson who was the only daughter of George Johnson Esq. of Warrington. The couple had three children, a son who died in infancy and two daughters. Unfortunately his wife Elizabeth died in 1766 at the age of 37. George became a Deputy Lieutenant of Cheshire and Justice of the Peace. He was well respected in the county. He died in 1794 and his eldest daughter Dorothy inherited Trafford Hall. As she had married the Reverend Richard Perryn twelve years earlier in 1782 he also became the owner and the property passed down through their descendants until the early 20th century.

=== The Perryn family ===
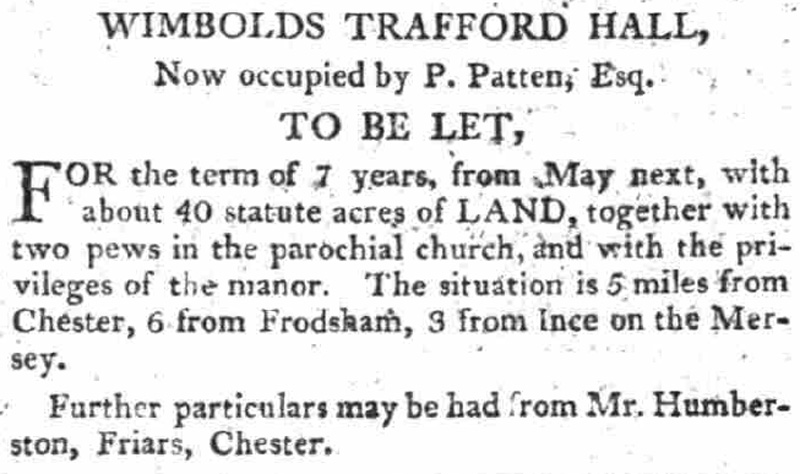
Rental notice for Trafford Hall in 1806.

Reverend Richard Perryn was born in 1754 in Standish, Cheshire. His father was Sir Richard Perryn a Welsh Judge who became Baron of the Exchequer. Richard was educated at Oxford University and became a clergyman. In 1779 he was appointed Rector of Standish by his father and he remained in this position for the next 45 years. As he and Dorothy mainly lived in the Rectory at Standish during this time, Trafford Hall was rented to various tenants. Richard died in 1826 and his son Richard Gerrard Perryn (1791–1850) inherited the Hall.

Richard Gerrard Perryn was born in 1791 in Trafford Hall. In 1822 he married Harriet Barbara Hatfield the daughter of Alex Hatfield of Twickenham. Unlike his parents who rented Trafford Hall to tenants, Richard Gerrard Perryn lived there with his family for the rest of his life. He had five children, three sons and two daughters. When he died in 1850 his eldest son Gerrard Alexander Perryn (1824-1878) inherited the property.

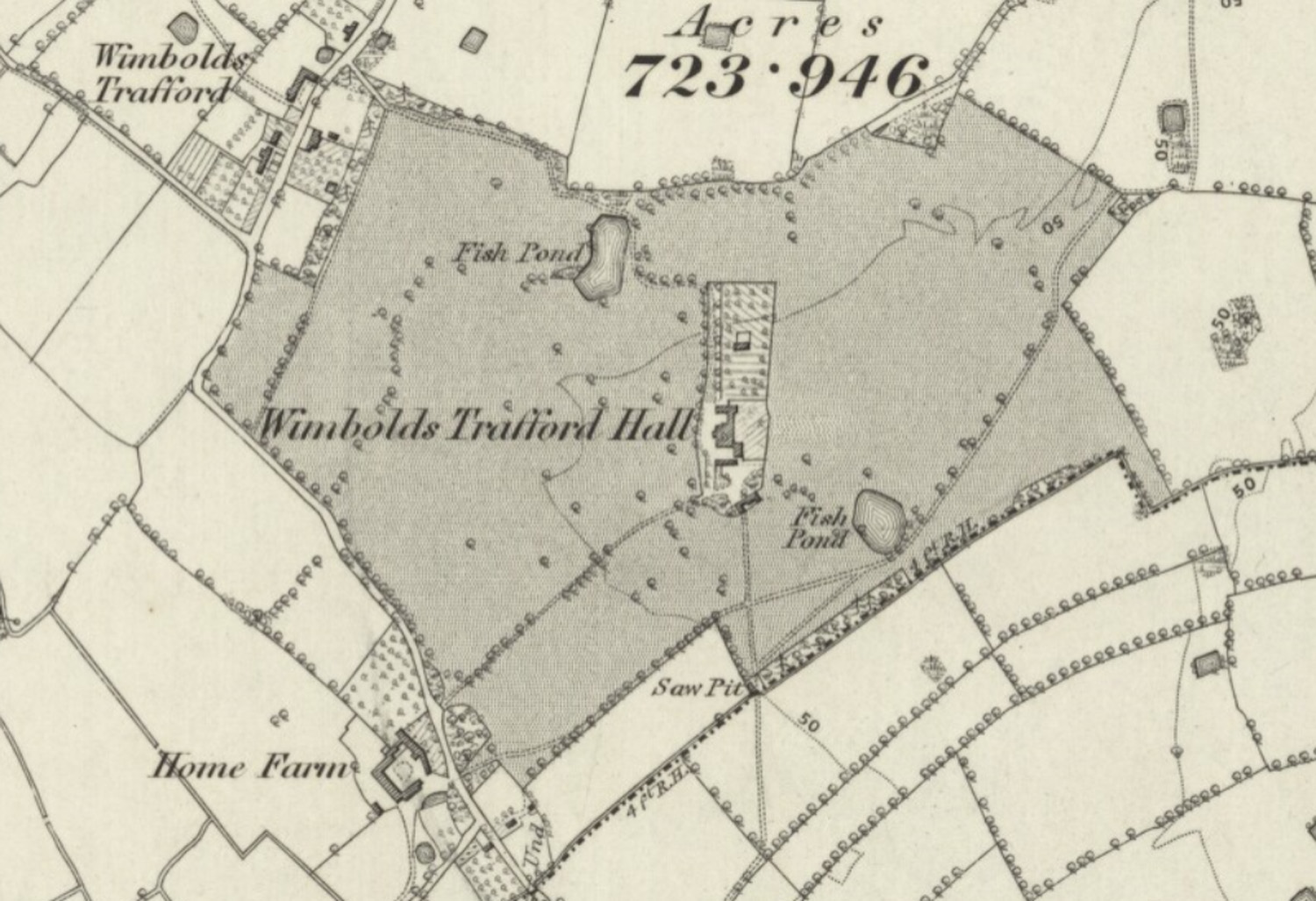
Map of Trafford Hall in 1871.

Gerrard Alexander Perryn was born in 1824 in Trafford Hall. He was educated at Oxford and became a clergyman. In 1857 he married Elizabeth Massey Wallis who was the daughter of Sir Provo William Parry Wallis, Admiral of the Fleet. The couple had no children and when Gerrard died in 1878 he left Trafford Hall to his wife Elizabeth. She lived there with Gerrard's unmarried sister Miss Harriet Perryn (1828-1906) until her death in 1890. Elizabeth died intestate and Trafford Hall therefore went to her next of kin which was her father Sir Provo William Wallis. He does not appear to have lived there as the 1891 Census shows that Miss Harriet Perryn was living there alone with the servants. In his Will of 1892 he left Trafford Hall to Harriet and the property therefore reverted to the Perryn family.

Miss Harriet Perryn is the only member of the Perryn family to have lived at Trafford Hall from her birth until her death. She was born in 1828. When she inherited the house in 1892 she became Lady of the Manor and chief landowner of Wimbolds Trafford. When she died in 1906 she left the property to her nephew Richard George Henry Perryn (1864-1927.

Richard George Henry Perryn was born in 1864 in Lancashire. His father was Richard Henry Perryn (1832-1904), Harriet's brother, and his mother was Frances Agnes White. In 1907 he married Frances Cotton Ashley who was the daughter of Henry Ashley of Yates Center, Kansas, USA. The couple lived at Trafford Hall with their two daughters until about 1920.

=== After 1920 ===
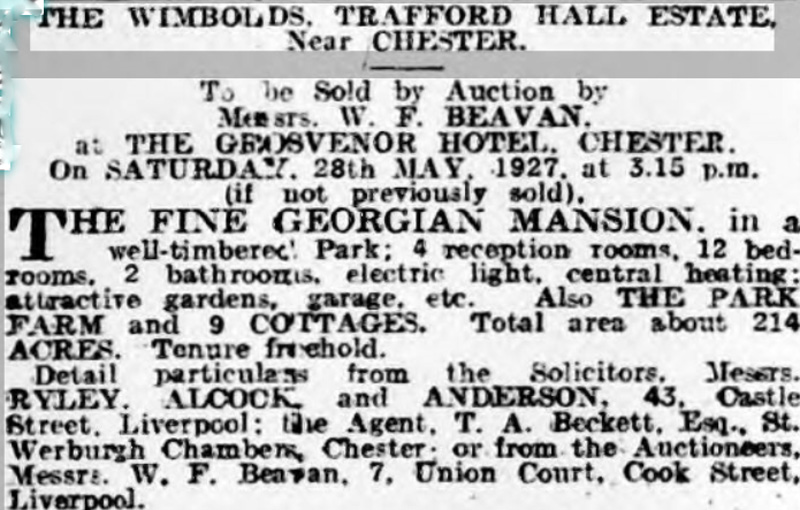
Sale notice for Trafford Hall in 1927

The next resident was Arthur Washington Willmer. He was a cotton broker from Liverpool and he lived at Trafford Hall with his wife Janet and children, until about 1927 when the house was put on the market.

Arthur Barrington Hines (1889–1939) was a resident from about 1930. He was a civil engineer and lived here with his wife Martha until about 1938. After this Sir William Nicholas Cayzer and his family moved into Trafford Hall.

Sir William Nicholas Cayzer (1910–1999) (known as Nicholas) came from a wealthy family of shipowners. Their firm Cayzer, Irvine & Co is now called Clan Line. In 1935 he married Elizabeth Catherine Williams who came from Wales. Shortly after their marriage he moved to Trafford Hall and worked in the family's shipping company offices in Liverpool. After the death of his uncle in 1958 he became chairman of the company.

In 1957 the hall was sold to Francis Edward Hanning-Lee (known as Frank) and his American wife Stella. They had earlier attempted a hydrofoil speed record in their boat White Hawk; they went into building of fibreglass boats and formed a company, Fibrelite Industries. Trafford Hall was the site of their manufacturing business. They remained there until 1987.

From 1989, the hall was owned by the National Communities Resource Centre (NCRC), a charity with aims to provide training and support to those living and working in low-income communities across the UK. From around 1991, the charity used the hall as a training and outreach centre, and a venue for conferences and weddings. In December 2020, NCRC became a subsidiary of Regenda Group, a property company providing affordable housing.

== Current use ==
In April 2021, the hall opened as a 53-bed hostel and training centre. Regenda appointed the Youth Hostels Association to run the facility.

== See also ==
- Grade II* listed buildings in Cheshire West and Chester
- Listed buildings in Wimbolds Trafford
