= St John the Baptist's Church, Guilden Sutton =

Coordinates: 53.2078°N 2.8265°W

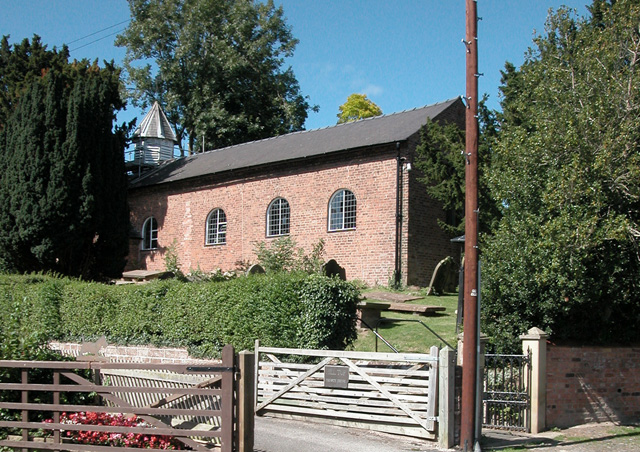
- St John's Church, Guilden Sutton

- Location in Cheshire
- OS grid reference: SJ 448 682
- Location: Guilden Sutton, Cheshire
- Country: England
- Denomination: Anglican
- Website: https://www.guildensutton-plemstall.church/

History
- Status: Parish church
- Dedication: John the Baptist

Architecture
- Functional status: Active
- Heritage designation: Grade II
- Designated: 1 June 1967
- Architectural type: Church
- Completed: 1815

Specifications
- Materials: Brick, Welsh slate roof

Administration
- Province: York
- Diocese: Chester
- Archdeaconry: Chester
- Deanery: Chester
- Parish: Guilden Sutton

Clergy
- Rector: currently vacant

St John the Baptist's Church is in the village of Guilden Sutton, near Chester, Cheshire, England. It is recorded in the National Heritage List for England as a designated Grade II listed building. It is an active Anglican parish church. The church is in the Diocese of Chester, the Archdeaconry of Chester, and the Deanery of Chester. Its benefice is combined with that of St Peter, Plemstall.

== History ==
The church was built in 1815 on the site of a previous church. The chancel of the previous church had blown down in 1802. A bellcote was added during the Victorian era. The interior was restored in 2001 when the chancel screen and choir stalls were removed, a toilet was provided and the entrance was improved. In 2005, the bellcote was restored after it had been damaged by a deathwatch beetle.

== Architecture ==
=== Exterior ===
The church is built in brick with Welsh slate roofs. Some of the fabric of the 16th-century church is still present in the wall of the nave. Its plan is simple and consists of a five-bay nave and chancel in one range, a south porch, and an octagonal louvered timber bellcote at the west end. The windows on the sides of the nave and chancel are simple and round-headed. The east window is lancet-shaped.

=== Interior ===
This is plain, with a raised chancel. There was formerly a wooden chancel screen. The doorway has twisted balusters and is dated 1698. In the church is a painted memorial plaque to the Whitehead family, which is probably by Randle Holme III. The font is dated 1635; it is round and decorated with a date and a single flower.

== External features ==
In the churchyard is a buff sandstone sundial. It consists of a column baluster on a square base with a cap in a different stone. The copper plate and gnomon are inscribed with the date 1596 and two sets of lines and numbers. It is listed as Grade II. The churchyard also contains the war graves of three soldiers, two from World War I and one from World War II.

== See also ==
- Listed buildings in Guilden Sutton
