= Trafford Mill =

Coordinates: 53.2292°N 2.8255°W

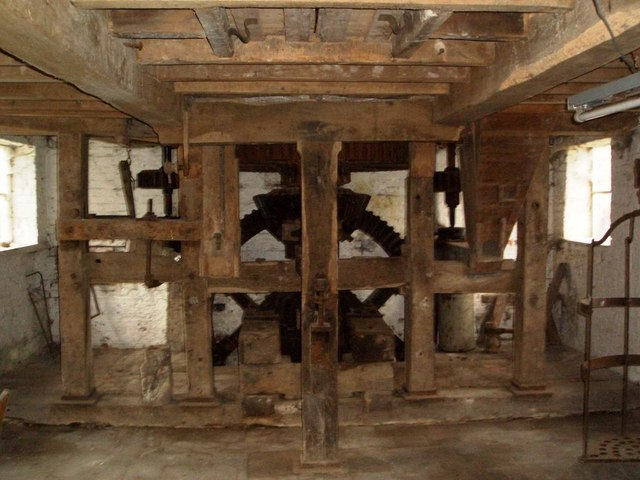
Interior of Trafford Mill

Trafford Mill is a water mill ¾ mile (1.2 km) to the north of the village of Mickle Trafford, Cheshire, England (grid reference SJ449705). It is recorded in the National Heritage List for England as a designated Grade II listed building.

== History ==
The earliest documentary reference to the Trafford Mill is in the Cheshire Chamberlains' Accounts of 1302–03. Further documentary records of the mill are in 1464 in the records of the Troutbeck family and in the Land Tax returns between 1784 and 1832. The building was offered for lease in an October 1767 edition of the Chester Chronicle. It was described in that advertisement in the form it is in now as 'this new built corn mill' thus dating the building at around 1760, nearly 100 years older than previously thought. It was sold at the Shrewsbury Sale of 1917 at which time it consisted of a three-floor corn mill, including two undershot water wheels (one of which was out of repair), a drying kiln, a barn, a stable and a shippon. In 1952 it ceased to be a working mill and was taken over by the North West Water Authority (now United Utilities). It was in a derelict condition and in the 1970s it was re-roofed and other repairs were made. Further repairs were made in 1998.

== Structure ==
It's an L-shaped building constructed largely in brick with a Welsh slate roof and a brick chimney. There is evidence that at least part of the foundations are laid on an oak raft though the foundations at the northern end appear to be sandstone. It has a long L-shaped plan in two storeys with a 12-bay west front.

The current mill was built in the 18th century. Two wheels and wheelpits are present. The north wheelpit has a cast-iron single-spoke wheel connected to flour sifting machinery that is dated 1883. It is thought that this end of the building was built on mediaeval foundations. This would explain the installation of a single-spoke wheel as this form is the only one narrow enough to fit in either of the two channels separated by a sandstone pier. The south wheelpit has a restored low breast wheel and a complete train of machinery driving three pairs of French burr stones. The ground floor has a quarry tiled floor and a cast-iron fireplace.

== Future plans ==
In 2001, a company limited by guarantee was set up. Its intention was to seek charitable status and to raise money to convert the mill into a museum and visitor centre. There have been 3 unsuccessful attempts to win lottery money. However a log burning heating system has been installed after an application to the Mersey Basin project and several smaller amounts of money gained that have helped to pay for tools and a polytunnel. In 2007, a kitchen garden was set up on the site of the former smallholding. This is maintained by volunteers. A group made up of the volunteers and local interested parties and called 'Friends of Trafford Mill' has been set up.

== See also ==
- Listed buildings in Mickle Trafford
