= Mickle Trafford railway station =

Former railway station in England

Mickle Trafford
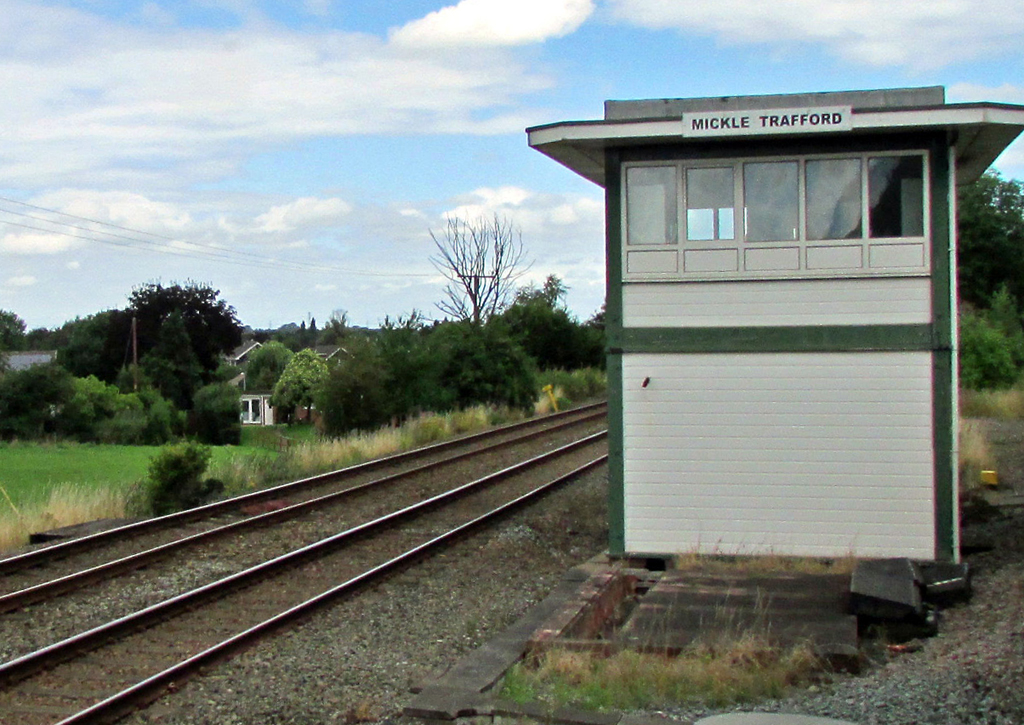
- Mickle Trafford signal box in 2013 showing also the line from Chester to Warrington

General information
- Location: Mickle Trafford, Cheshire West and Chester; England
- Coordinates: 53.2181°N 2.8307°W
- Grid reference: SJ446693
- Platforms: 2

Other information
- Status: Disused

History
- Original company: Birkenhead Joint Railway
- Pre-grouping: Birkenhead Joint Railway
- Post-grouping: Birkenhead Joint Railway

Key dates
- December 1889: Station opened
- 2 April 1951: Station closed
Location

Mickle Trafford railway station was a station on the Birkenhead Joint Railway in Mickle Trafford, Cheshire.

== History and operations ==
The station was open for the use by passengers between 1889 and 1951 when it was closed and was subsequently demolished. Although all traces of the station have now been removed, the site remains an active operational location, as the Mid-Cheshire Line passenger trains from Manchester via Stockport and Altrincham join the main Chester - Warrington (Bank Quay) - Manchester Piccadilly line at this point and Mickle Trafford signal box remains in use to work the junction between the two routes.

Preceding station	Historical railways	Following station
Chester General	Birkenhead Joint Railway	Dunham Hill

== Bibliography ==
- Butt R.V.J, The Directory of Railway Stations, 1995, Patrick Stephens Limited, ISBN 1-85260-508-1
