= Wimbolds Trafford =

Hamlet in Cheshire, England

Coordinates: 53.246°N 2.829°W

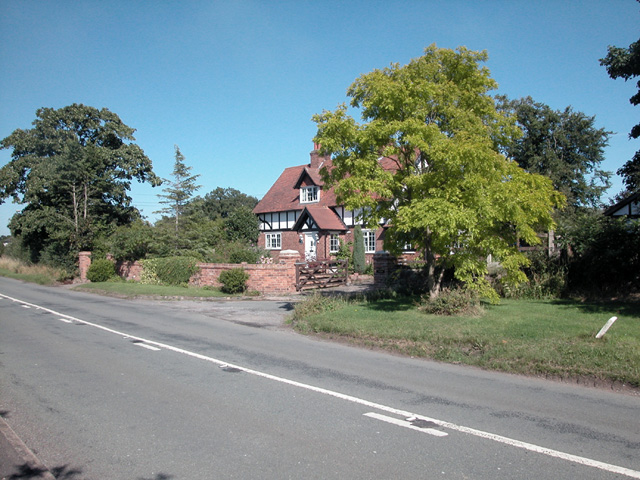
- Ince Lane

- Location within Cheshire
- Population: 212 (2011 census)
- OS grid reference: SJ446724
- Civil parish: Mickle Trafford and District
- Unitary authority: Cheshire West and Chester
- Ceremonial county: Cheshire
- Region: North West
- Country: England
- Sovereign state: United Kingdom
- Post town: CHESTER
- Postcode district: CH2
- Police: Cheshire
- Fire: Cheshire
- Ambulance: North West
- UK Parliament: Runcorn and Helsby

Wimbolds Trafford is a hamlet in the civil parish of Mickle Trafford and District, in Cheshire West and Chester, Cheshire, England. The hamlet lies on the B5132 road, approximately 5 miles (8 km) north-east of Chester and north of the village of Mickle Trafford. Wimbolds Trafford was formerly a separate civil parish until 2015. In 2011 the parish of Wimbolds Trafford had a population of 212.

== History ==
The present name Wimbolds Trafford comes from Winebald's Trafford, with the latter meaning "valley ford". Winebald (a personal noun) is combined with the Old English words trog (a trough or hollow) and ford (a ford or crossing).

Wimbolds Trafford was recorded in the Domesday Book with a population of three households of "two smallholders and one riders". Consisting of one ploughland under the ownership of Earl Hugh of Chester, it had a taxable value of "1 geld units".

Wimbold Trafford in the early 1870s was described as:

...a township in Thornton-le-Moors parish, Cheshire; 4¼ miles NE of Chester. Acres, 574. Real property, £1,081. Pop., 113. Houses, 18.

== Governance ==
There are two tiers of local government covering Wimbolds Trafford, at parish and unitary authority level: Mickle Trafford and District Parish Council, and Cheshire West and Chester Council. The parish council generally meets at the village hall in Mickle Trafford.

=== Administrative history ===
Wimbolds Trafford was historically a township in the ancient parish of Thornton-le-Moors, which formed part of the Eddisbury Hundred of Cheshire. From the 17th century onwards, parishes were gradually given various civil functions under the poor laws, in addition to their original ecclesiastical functions. In some cases, including Thornton-le-Moors, the civil functions were exercised by each township separately rather than the parish as a whole. In 1866, the legal definition of 'parish' was changed to be the areas used for administering the poor laws, and so Wimbolds Trafford became a civil parish, whilst remaining part of the ecclesiastical parish of Thornton-le-Moors.

From 1972 the parish was placed under a grouped parish council called the Mickle Trafford and District Parish Council, which also covered Bridge Trafford, Mickle Trafford, Hoole Village, and Picton. On 1 April 2015 the five parishes within the group were merged into a single civil parish called Mickle Trafford and District, subject to some minor adjustments to boundaries with neighbouring parishes.

== Demography ==
=== Population ===
Following the abolition of the parish in 2015, data is no longer published for Wimbolds Trafford alone. The population of the township or civil parish recorded in selected censuses up to 2011 was as follows:

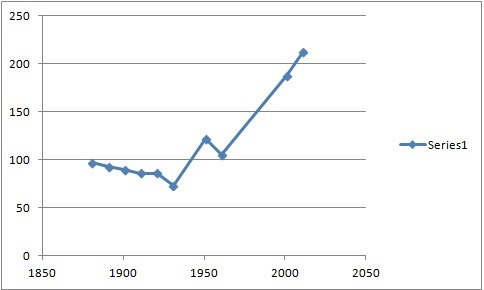
Population for graph for Wimbolds Trafford using census data

Historical census figures
Year	Population
1801	111
1851	106
1881	97
1901	90
1911	86
1921	86
1931	73
1951	122
2001	188
2011	212

=== Employment ===
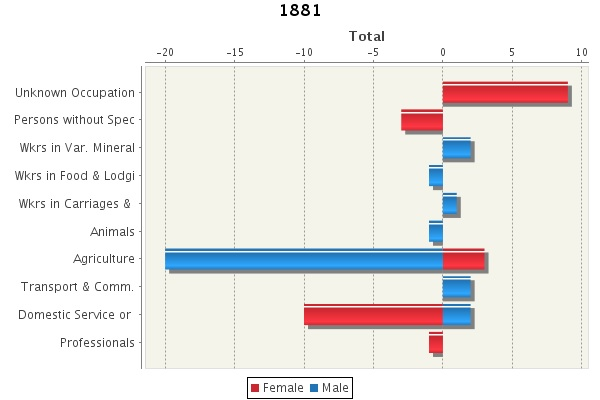
occupation data 1881

This graph shows occupation data for both males and females in 1881. Work in agriculture was the most common occupation for men, while for women the highest occupation was in domestic service.

== Landmarks ==
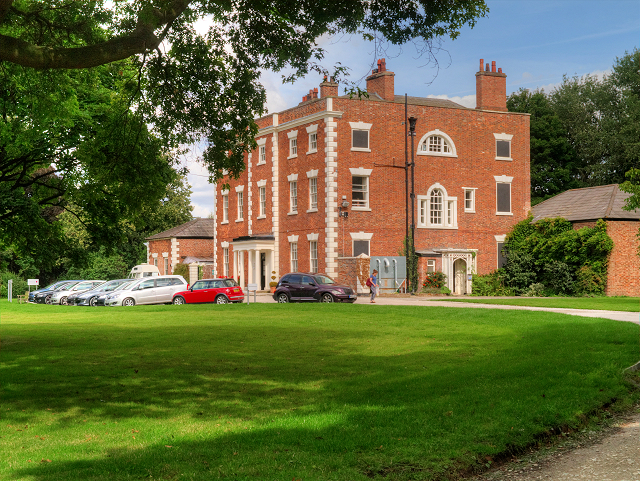
Trafford Hall

Trafford Hall was built in 1756 and is designated a Grade II* listed building. As of 2025 the venue is used as a National Communities Resource Centre, which is a registered charity offering training and support to those living and working in low-income areas throughout the United Kingdom. Trafford Hall can also be hired out for events, conferences and as a wedding venue.

== See also ==
- Listed buildings in Wimbolds Trafford
