= Anne Power =

British social policy writer and academic

Anne Elizabeth Power MBE, CBE is an emerita professor of social policy and Head of Housing and Communities at the London School of Economics. She is a founder of the National Communities Resource Centre. Power is the author of several books and has had writings published in the Guardian.

== Career ==
From 1979 to 1989 Power worked for the Department of the Environment and Welsh Office, helping set up the Priority Estates Projects to rescue run-down estates countrywide.

In 1991 Power became founding director of the National Communities Resource Centre, which she founded with Brian Abel-Smith and Richard Rogers.

Power was awarded a CBE in June 2000, for services to regeneration and the promotion of resident participation. Between the years 2000 to 2009 Power was a Commissioner on the Sustainable Development Commission.

== List of books ==
- Property Before People: The management of Twentieth-Century Council Housing (1987)
- Hovels to High Rise (1993)
- Swimming against the tide (1995) - co-authored with Rebecca Tunstall
- Dangerous Disorder (1997) - co-authored with Rebecca Tunstall
- The Slow Death of Great Cities? Urban abandonment or urban renaissance (1999)- with Katharine Mumford
- Estates on the Edge (1999)
- Cities for a Small Country (2000) - written with Richard Rodgers
- Boom or Abandonment (2003) - with Katharine Mumford
- East Enders: Family and community in East London (2003) with Katharine Mumford
- City survivors, Bringing up children in disadvantaged neighbourhoods (2007)
- Jigsaw cities: Big places, small spaces (2007) - co-authored by John Houghton
- Phoenix cities, The fall and rise of great industrial cities (2010) - with Jörg Plöger and Astrid Winkler
- Family futures, Childhood and poverty in urban neighbourhoods (2011) - with Helen Willmot and Rosemary Davidson
- Cities for a Small Continent, International Handbook of City Recovery (2016)
