= Dunham Hill railway station =

Former railway station in England

Dunham Hill
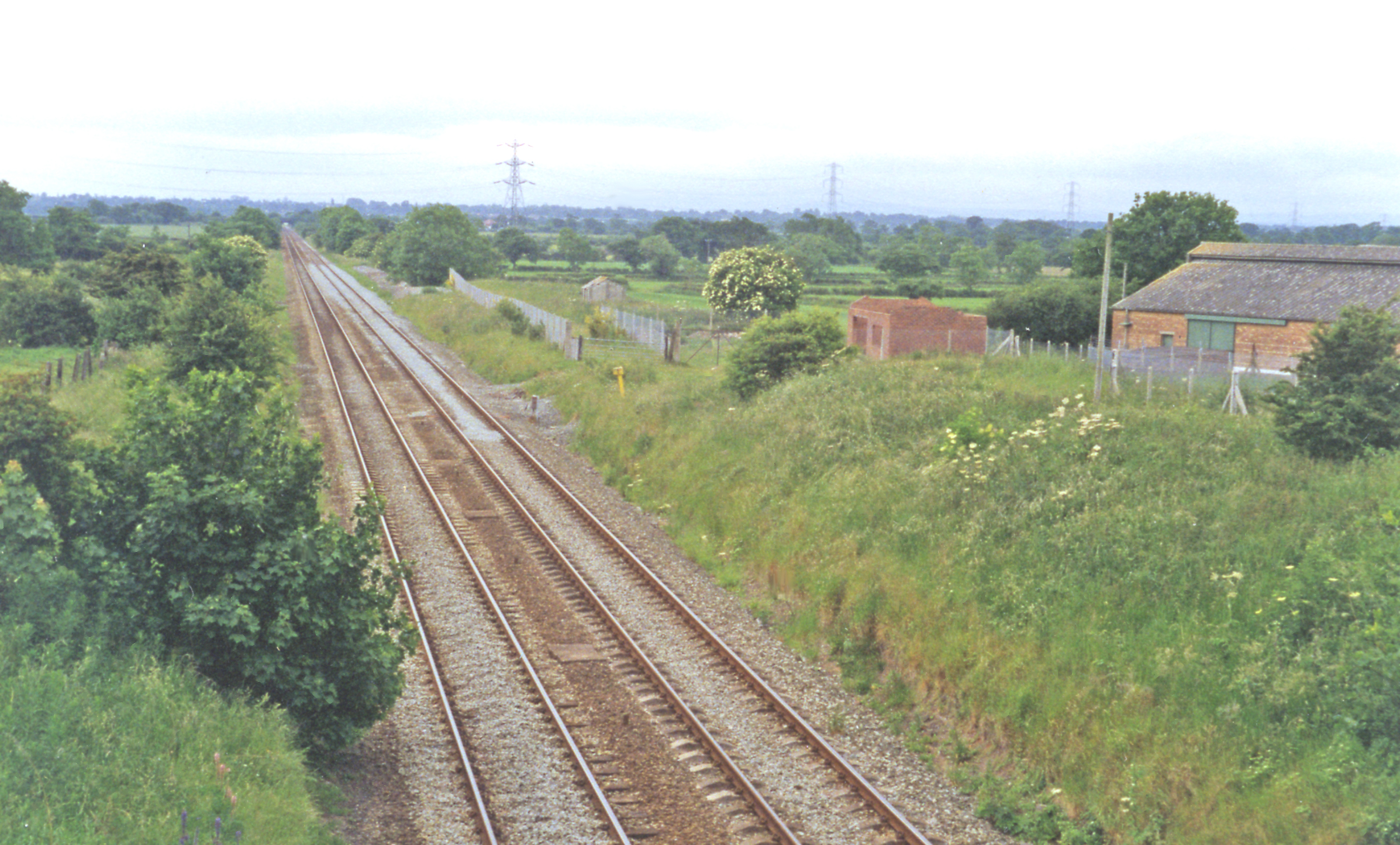
- Site of the former station (1994)

General information
- Location: Dunham on the Hill, Cheshire West and Chester; England
- Coordinates: 53.2488°N 2.7994°W
- Grid reference: SJ463727
- Platforms: 2

Other information
- Status: Disused

History
- Original company: Birkenhead, Lancashire and Cheshire Junction Railway
- Pre-grouping: Birkenhead Joint Railway
- Post-grouping: Birkenhead Joint Railway

Key dates
- 18 December 1850: Opened as Dunham
- April 1861: Renamed Dunham Hill
- 7 April 1952: Closed
Location

Dunham Hill railway station was a railway station in Dunham-on-the-Hill, Cheshire. It was opened in 1850 and closed in 1952. Near to the station was a branch line leading to the former ROF Dunham on the Hill explosives storage depot. The station buildings were demolished after closure but the platforms remained until the 1970s.

Preceding station	Historical railways	Following station
Mickle Trafford	Birkenhead Joint Railway	Helsby
