= Listed buildings in Guilden Sutton =

Guilden Sutton is a civil parish and village in Cheshire West and Chester, England. It contains three buildings that are recorded in the National Heritage List for England as designated listed buildings, all of which are at Grade II. This is the lowest of the three grades, which contains "buildings of national importance and special interest".

== Buildings ==
Name and location	Photograph	Date	Notes
Sundial, St John's Churchyard, Guilden Sutton; 53.20773°N 2.82661°W	—	1596	The plate of the sundial is dated 1596 and the sandstone baluster on which it is mounted dates from the 18th century. It stands on a square base.
Hill Farmhouse, Guilden Sutton; 53.2087°N 2.8246°W	—	Late 17th century	There have been later additions. It is an L-shaped two-storey house in rendered brick with slate roofs. It has two chimneys, one of which has zigzag tilework between the flues. The windows are casements.
St John the Baptist's Church, Guilden Sutton; 53.2078°N 2.8265°W		1802–10	Built in brick with Welsh slate roofs, the church incorporates some 16th-century fabric. It has a south porch and bellcote. The interior of the church was restored in 2001. The font is dated 1635 and the doorway 1698.

== See also ==
- Listed buildings in Barrow
- Listed buildings in Christleton
- Listed buildings in Great Boughton
- Listed buildings in Mickle Trafford
