= Bridge Trafford =

Hamlet in Cheshire, England

Coordinates: 53.235°N 2.825°W

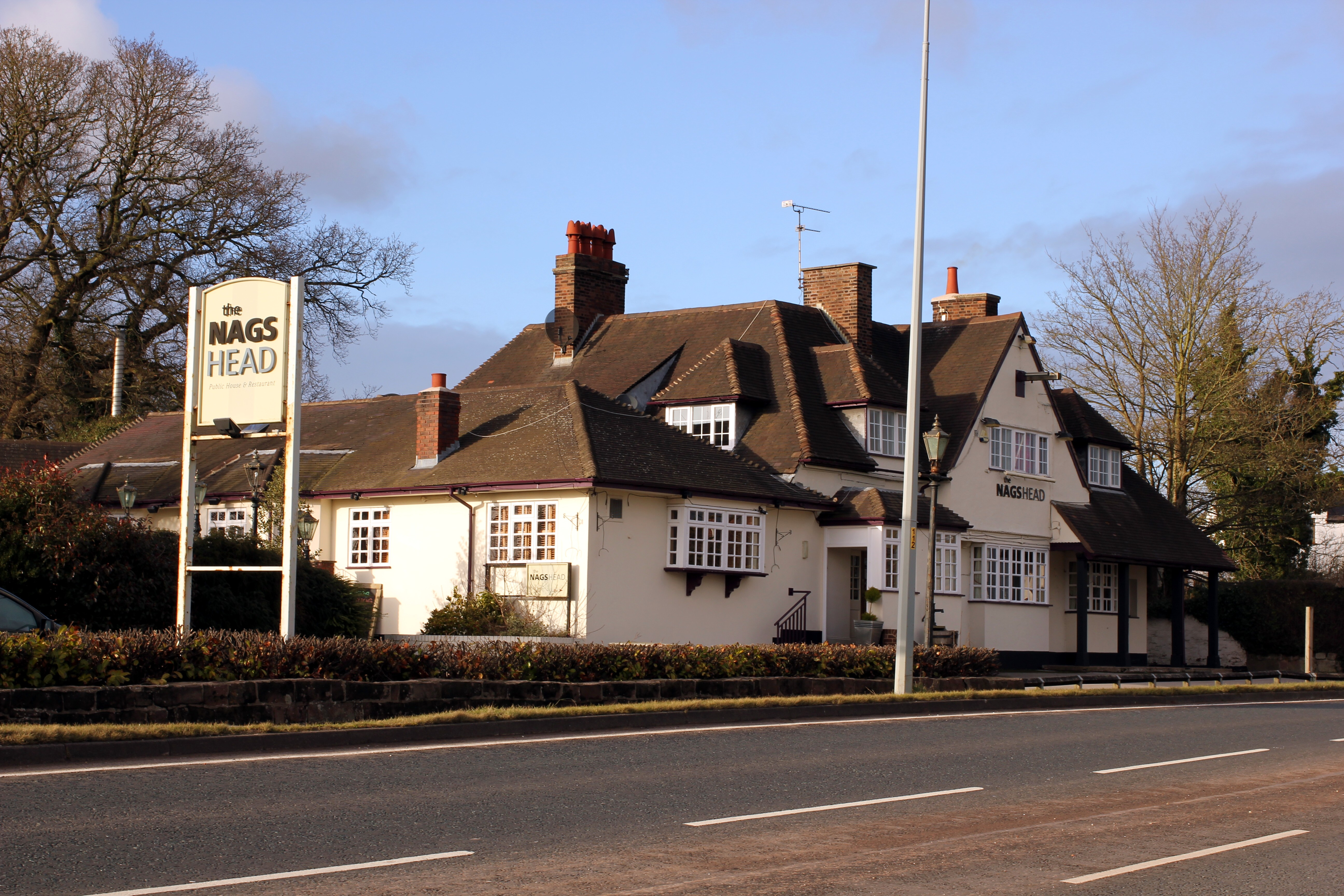
- The Nags Head public house, Bridge Trafford

- Location within Cheshire
- Population: 33 (2001 census)
- OS grid reference: SJ449713
- Civil parish: Mickle Trafford and District
- Unitary authority: Cheshire West and Chester
- Ceremonial county: Cheshire
- Region: North West
- Country: England
- Sovereign state: United Kingdom
- Post town: CHESTER
- Postcode district: CH2
- Dialling code: 01244
- Police: Cheshire
- Fire: Cheshire
- Ambulance: North West
- UK Parliament: Runcorn and Helsby

Bridge Trafford is a hamlet in the civil parish of Mickle Trafford and District, in Cheshire West and Chester, Cheshire, England. It lies 2 miles (3 km) to the north of Mickle Trafford on the A56 road, and is 4 miles (6 km) north-east of Chester. Bridge Trafford was formerly a separate civil parish until 2015.

== History ==
It is believed that the Roman road from Chester to Wilderspool (now part of Warrington) passed through the parish. In 1991 a Roman bronze brooch was found in the parish.

Immediately to the south of the hamlet the River Gowy is crossed by Trafford Bridge. A stone bridge was first built here in 1410 and there was probably a wooden bridge before that. After the Civil War the bridge needed repairs and these were carried out in 1648.

== Governance ==
There are two tiers of local government covering Bridge Trafford, at parish and unitary authority level: Mickle Trafford and District Parish Council, and Cheshire West and Chester Council. The parish council generally meets at the village hall in Mickle Trafford.

=== Administrative history ===
Bridge Trafford was historically a township in the ancient parish of Plemstall, which formed part of the Broxton Hundred of Cheshire. From the 17th century onwards, parishes were gradually given various civil functions under the poor laws, in addition to their original ecclesiastical functions. In some cases, including Plemstall, the civil functions were exercised by each township separately rather than the parish as a whole. In 1866, the legal definition of 'parish' was changed to be the areas used for administering the poor laws, and so Bridge Trafford became a civil parish, whilst remaining part of the ecclesiastical parish of Plemstall.

Bridge Trafford was too small to have a parish council, having a parish meeting instead. In 1960, the parish was placed under a grouped parish council with Hoole Village and Mickle Trafford, called the Mickle Trafford and District Parish Council. In 1972, the group of parishes was enlarged to also include Picton and Wimbolds Trafford. On 1 April 2015 the five parishes within the group were merged into a single civil parish called Mickle Trafford and District, subject to some minor adjustments to boundaries with neighbouring parishes.

At the 2001 census (the last census which published statistics for the parish of Bridge Trafford) it had a population of 33. From 1974 to 2009 it was in Chester district.
