= Mickle Trafford =

Village in Cheshire, England

Coordinates: 53.22101°N 2.83293°W

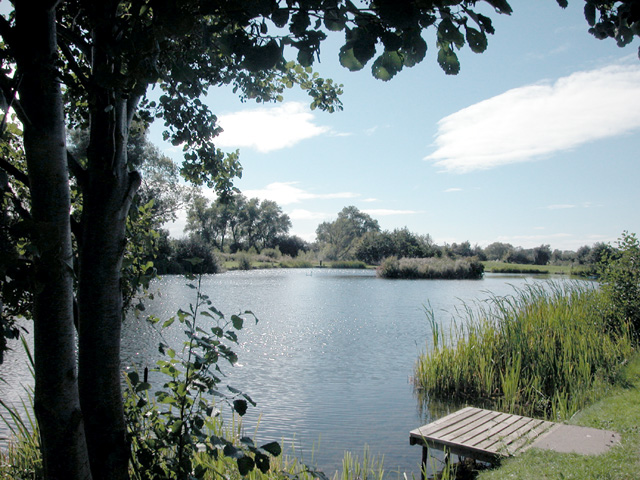
- One of three fishing lakes at Meadow Fishery, Mickle Trafford

- Location within Cheshire
- Population: 2,390 (Mickle Trafford and District parish, 2021)
- OS grid reference: SJ444696
- Civil parish: Mickle Trafford and District
- Unitary authority: Cheshire West and Chester
- Ceremonial county: Cheshire
- Region: North West
- Country: England
- Sovereign state: United Kingdom
- Post town: CHESTER
- Postcode district: CH2
- Dialling code: 01244
- Police: Cheshire
- Fire: Cheshire
- Ambulance: North West
- UK Parliament: Runcorn and Helsby

Mickle Trafford is a village in Cheshire West and Chester, Cheshire, England. It is the main village in the civil parish of Mickle Trafford and District. The A56 road from Chester to Warrington passes through the village and the Chester-Warrington railway line passes immediately to its east. In 2011, the parish of Mickle Trafford had a population of 1,822.

== Toponymy ==
The name is derived from the Old Norse word mikill (meaning big or great) and the Old English words trog (a trough) and ford.

== History ==
The only artefacts found from the prehistoric period are an arrowhead and a worked flake which were found in the nearby settlement of Hoole Village. The arrowhead is dated from the Early Bronze to the Early Iron Age (2350 BC to 701 BC). The Roman road from Chester to Wilderspool (near the present town of Warrington) passed through or near the village. It is likely that the road known as The Street, which passes to the northwest of the village, was the route of the Roman road. Finds of Roman coins, jewellery and pottery have been found in the village and nearby. There is also evidence of Roman practice camps in the nearby settlements of Hoole Village and Picton. Mickle Trafford is not mentioned in the Anglo-Saxon Chronicle, but a raised area in a marsh by the River Gowy to the northeast of the present village, was known as the "Isle of Chester". Here lived a hermit called Plegmund, who was later to become the Archbishop of Canterbury, and the area is now known as Plemstall, which means "Plegmund's holy place".

The village was previously served by two railway stations: Mickle Trafford and Mickle Trafford East. Although the stations have been demolished, both lines remain operational.

== Governance ==
There are two tiers of local government covering Mickle Trafford, at parish and unitary authority level: Mickle Trafford and District Parish Council, and Cheshire West and Chester Council. The parish council generally meets at the village hall in Mickle Trafford.

=== Administrative history ===
Mickle Trafford was historically one of four township in the ancient parish of Plemstall, which formed part of the Broxton Hundred of Cheshire. The other hamlets in Plemstall parish were Bridge Trafford, Hoole and Picton. The small hamlet of Plemstall itself, around St Peter's Church, was within the boundaries of the Mickle Trafford township. From the 17th century onwards, parishes were gradually given various civil functions under the poor laws, in addition to their original ecclesiastical functions. In some cases, including Plemstall, the civil functions were exercised by each township separately rather than the parish as a whole. In 1866, the legal definition of 'parish' was changed to be the areas used for administering the poor laws, and so Mickle Trafford became a civil parish, whilst remaining part of the ecclesiastical parish of Plemstall.

The population of the Mickle Trafford township or civil parish was 247 in 1801, 303 in 1851, 268 in 1901 and 348 in 1951. In 1960, the parish was placed under a grouped parish council with Bridge Trafford and Hoole Village, called the Mickle Trafford and District Parish Council. In 1972, the group of parishes was enlarged to also include Picton and Wimbolds Trafford. On 1 April 2015 the five parishes within the group were merged into a single civil parish called Mickle Trafford and District, subject to some minor adjustments to boundaries with neighbouring parishes.

== Landmarks and places of interest ==
St Peter's Church, Plemstall is located to the northeast of the village and is a Grade I listed building On the lane leading to the church is St Plegmund's well. Other buildings in and around the village are listed at Grade II. To the north of the village is Trafford Mill. The other listed buildings are Mickle Trafford Manor, Windsor Lodge, Ivy Bank Farmhouse, and a farm building associated with Ivy Bank Farmhouse.

== Notable people ==
- Matilda Freeman (born 2004), actress (Coronation Street, Alma's Not Normal)

== See also ==
- Listed buildings in Mickle Trafford
