= Picton, Cheshire =

Hamlet in Cheshire, England

Coordinates: 53.23°N 2.85°W

Picton
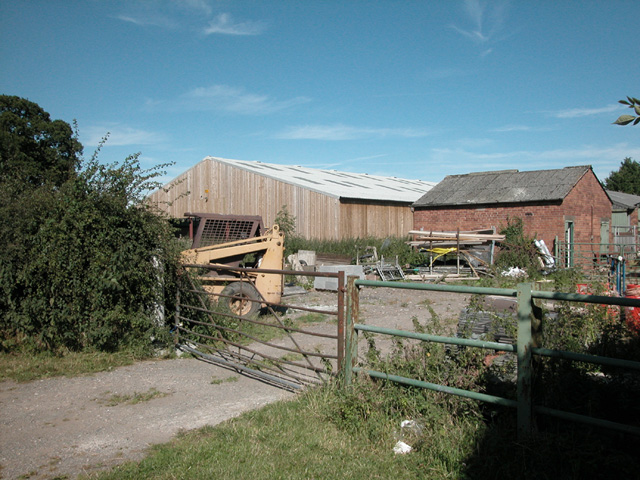
- Picton Gorse

- Location within Cheshire
- Population: 58 (2001 census)
- OS grid reference: SJ432710
- Civil parish: Mickle Trafford and District
- Unitary authority: Cheshire West and Chester
- Ceremonial county: Cheshire
- Region: North West
- Country: England
- Sovereign state: United Kingdom
- Post town: CHESTER
- Postcode district: CH2
- Dialling code: 01244
- Police: Cheshire
- Fire: Cheshire
- Ambulance: North West
- UK Parliament: Runcorn and Helsby

Picton is a hamlet in the civil parish of Mickle Trafford and District, in Cheshire West and Chester, Cheshire, England. It lies 4 miles (6.4 km) north-east of Chester. Picton was formerly a separate civil parish until 2015.

== Toponymy ==
The name derives partly from a personal noun, with Pica's-tūn, meaning Pica's settlement or farmstead.

== History ==
Evidence of a Roman practice fort was found in 1995 through aerial photography.

Picton Hall and Picton Hall Farmhouse are designated by English Heritage as a Grade II listed building.

== Governance ==
There are two tiers of local government covering Picton, at parish and unitary authority level: Mickle Trafford and District Parish Council, and Cheshire West and Chester Council. The parish council generally meets at the village hall in Mickle Trafford.

=== Administrative history ===
Picton was historically a township in the ancient parish of Plemstall, which formed part of the Broxton Hundred of Cheshire. From the 17th century onwards, parishes were gradually given various civil functions under the poor laws, in addition to their original ecclesiastical functions. In some cases, including Plemstall, the civil functions were exercised by each township separately rather than the parish as a whole. In 1866, the legal definition of 'parish' was changed to be the areas used for administering the poor laws, and so Picton became a civil parish, whilst remaining part of the ecclesiastical parish of Plemstall.

The population of the township or civil parish was 138 in 1801, 155 in 1851, 141 in 1901, 119 in 1951, and 58 in the 2001 census, which was the last census to report a population for the parish.

From 1972 the parish was placed under a grouped parish council called the Mickle Trafford and District Parish Council, which also covered Bridge Trafford, Mickle Trafford, Hoole Village, and Wimbolds Trafford. On 1 April 2015 the five parishes within the group were merged into a single civil parish called Mickle Trafford and District, subject to some minor adjustments to boundaries with neighbouring parishes.
