= Listed buildings in Wimbolds Trafford =

Wimbolds Trafford is a former civil parish, now in the parish of Mickle Trafford and District, in Cheshire West and Chester, England. It contains five buildings that are recorded in the National Heritage List for England as designated listed buildings. Of these, one is listed at Grade II*, the middle grade, and the others are at Grade II. The parish is entirely rural. Its listed buildings consist of a former country house and its lodge, a cottage, a farmhouse, and farm buildings.

== Key ==
Grade	Criteria
II*	Particularly important buildings of more than special interest
II	Buildings of national importance and special interest

== Buildings ==
Name and location	Photograph	Date	Notes	Grade
Barn, Manor Farm; 53.24931°N 2.82551°W	—	Late 16th or early 17th century	The barn is partly timber-framed with brick nogging on a stone plinth, and partly in brick. It has a tiled roof and a two-bay front. It contains a central entrance, two rectangular openings, and air vents in the gable.	II
Park Farm and farm buildings 53.24128°N 2.82766°W	—	Early 18th century	The buildings are rendered and have slate roofs. The farmhouse is in two storeys and has a two-bay front with casement windows. Attached to each side of the farmhouse are farm buildings, one of which has been converted into a dwelling. These form long wings, and are slightly canted back from the house.	II
Trafford Hall; 53.24363°N 2.82390°W		1756	A country house with later additions. It is in brick with stone dressings and has a slate roof. The house is in three storeys, with a five-bay front, the central bay protruding slightly forward and containing a four-column Doric porch. At the top of the house is a cornice and a brick parapet with stone piers. The windows at the front are sashes, and on the right side is a Venetian window and a Diocletian window. Attached to the left side are a service wing and a former carriage house.	II*
Windsor Cottage; 53.24968°N 2.82781°W	—	Early 19th century	A house in two storeys with a front containing three windows in each floor. The windows have pointed heads and iron frames.	II
Lodge, Trafford Hall; 53.24076°N 2.82646°W	—	Mid 19th century	The lodge is rendered on a stone plinth, and has a slate roof. It is in a single storey, and has a cruciform plan, with gabled single bays. An additional wing has been added to the rear. The windows contain Gothic tracery.	II
