= Administrative county of Cornwall =

The Administrative county of Cornwall was created by the Local Government Act 1888. The act created a system of local government, and as part of this new structure of government, Cornwall and the Isles of Scilly were split into different administrative areas.
