= Hoole Hall =

Country house in Cheshire, England

Coordinates: 53.20629°N 2.85447°W

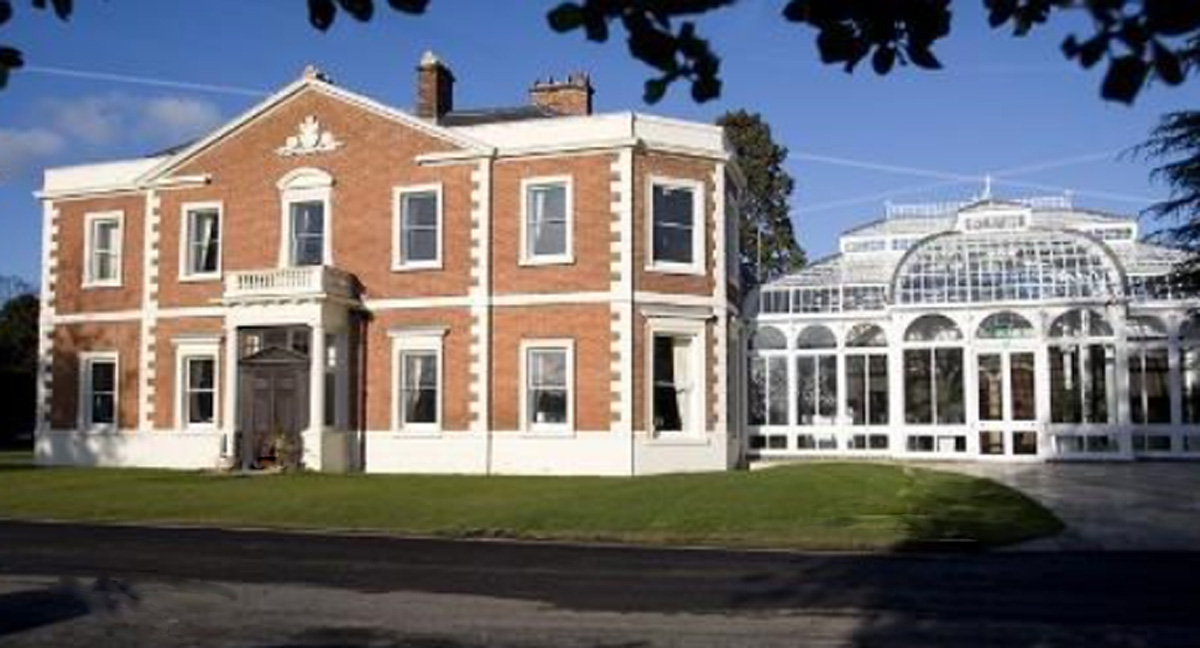
Hoole Hall, Chester

Hoole Hall is a former country house located to the north of Chester, Cheshire, England. It originated as a small house in about 1760, built for the Rev John Baldwin. After Rev Baldwin's death in 1793, the house passed to his eldest son, Thomas Baldwin, who then sold the house and surrounding land in 1800.

Extensive additions were made to it in the 19th century including an elaborate cast iron conservatory. The conservatory was not designed by Thomas Harrison in about 1820, as some have stated. He in fact designed the one at Hoole House. The Hoole Hall conservatory does not appear in illustrations until after 1850. During the 20th century it was used by Western Command Army Division to house the Pay Corps and later abandoned and became derelict, but was then converted into a hotel. It is constructed in plum-coloured brick, with stone dressings and a Welsh slate roof. Its plan is square, plus a servants' wing. The west wing has two storeys, is symmetrical, sits on a stone plinth, and has rusticated quoins. Figueirdo and Treuherz describe it as "a miniature astylar Palladian villa of brick with stucco dressings". The house is recorded in the National Heritage List for England as a designated Grade II listed building.

== The Reverend John Baldwin ==
The Reverend John Baldwin built Hoole Hall in about 1760. He was born in 1710 and was the son of Rev. Thomas Baldwin of Leyland; his mother was Anne Rigbye the daughter of Nicholas Rigbye of Harrock Hall who died in 1740. When Anne's two brothers died without issue Harrock Hall was passed to their sister Eleanor for her life and when she died in 1787 it was passed to her nephew (Anne's son) Rev John Baldwin; he was obliged to change his name to Rigbye. He moved with his wife to Harrock Hall where he died in 1793. He left Hoole Hall to his eldest son Thomas Baldwin, a balloonist who wrote a 1785 book about his experiences. He sold the house to a Mrs Fairfax, who in turn sold it to John Oliver.

== The Oliver family ==
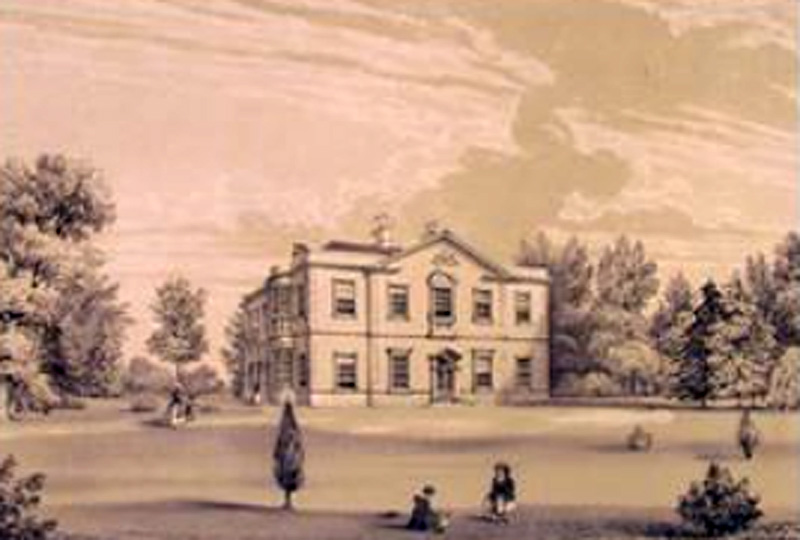
Hoole Hall in 1846

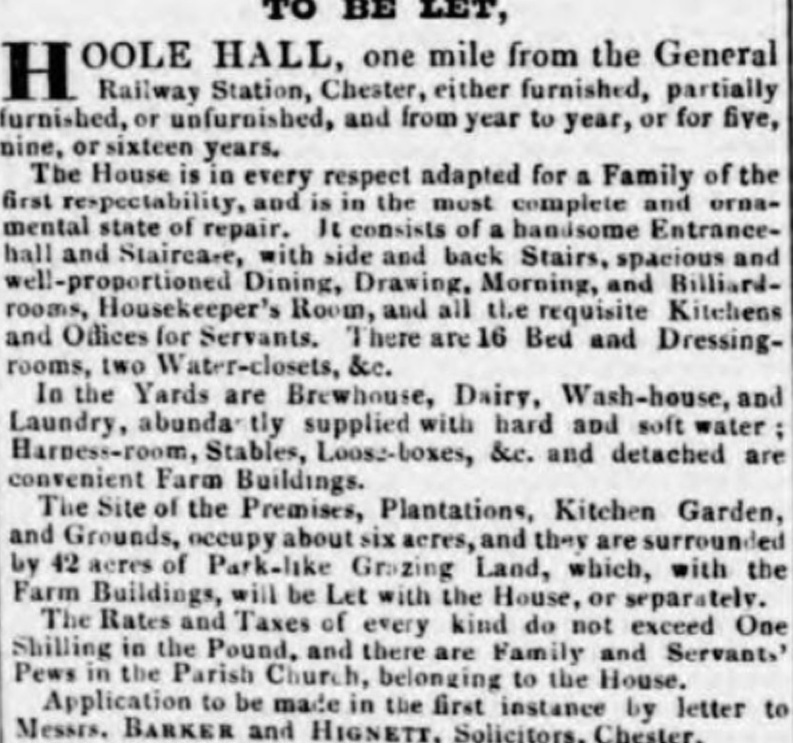
To let notice for Hoole Hall 1852

John Oliver bought Hoole Hall in about 1795 as his eldest son Thomas Long Oliver was baptised at Thornton-le-Moors at this time. He remained at Hoole for the next twelve years and during this time he and his wife Jane had seven more children two more boys and five girls. In 1817 he moved to Harley Street London but retained ownership of Hoole Hall. He rented it to James Sedgwick for the next 17 years.

John Oliver died in 1832 and his eldest son Thomas Long Oliver inherited the property. Thomas lived in France so Hoole Hall was continually rented until his death in 1855. After James Sedgwick left William Yates rented the house with his mother Elizabeth Yates and two sisters Jane and Harriet. William died in 1839 while he was holidaying in Rome and his mother died the following year. The 1841 Census shows the two sisters still living there. They left in 1846 and John Lister became the next tenant. A picture of the house in this year is shown. John Lister left in 1852 and one of the rental advertisements for the Hall is shown at this time. After the death of Thomas Long Oliver, the owner, in 1855 the property was sold to Arthur Potts.

== The Potts family ==
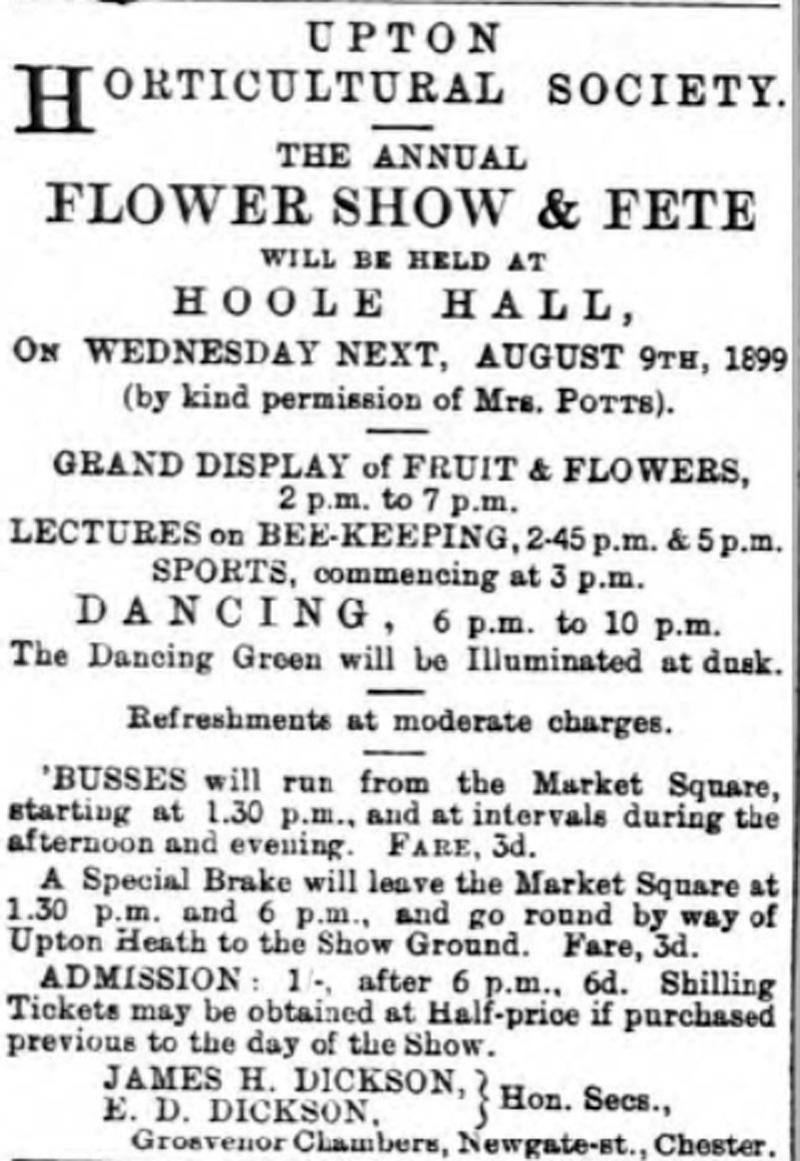
Flower show notice at Hoole Hall in 1899

Arthur Potts bought Hoole Hall in about 1857 and he and his family lived here for the next 55 years. Arthur Potts was born in 1814 in Denbighshire. He became an apprentice engineer and was known to Robert Stephenson, the famous locomotive designer. He also became interested in locomotives and with his partner John Jones established the firm called Jones and Potts which built engines for various railways and employed 800 men.

He retired in about 1853 with a large fortune and several years later bought Hoole Hall where he amused himself in the horticultural pursuits of growing orchids and collecting alpine plants. He is mentioned frequently in the gardening magazines of the time. They had only one child, Edith, who was born in 1859. Arthur died in 1888 and his wife Elizabeth (née Wardell) continued to live at Hoole Hall.

Elizabeth was born in 1829 in Chester. She was the only child of William Wardell a very wealthy banker. When he died in 1864 she inherited a large amount of money. She had a strong interest in gardening and won many prizes for her flowers. In 1899 a large flower show was held at Hoole Hall. The advertisement for this occasion is shown. She died in 1911 and her daughter Edith, who had married the Reverend Oswald Pryor Wardell-Yerburgh in 1889, inherited the property. Her husband died in 1913 and Edith lived at Hoole Hall with her daughter Hilda until 1924 when she sold it to Sir Alexander Maguire. He then sold it in 1929 to Charles Edward Holmes.

== The Holmes family ==
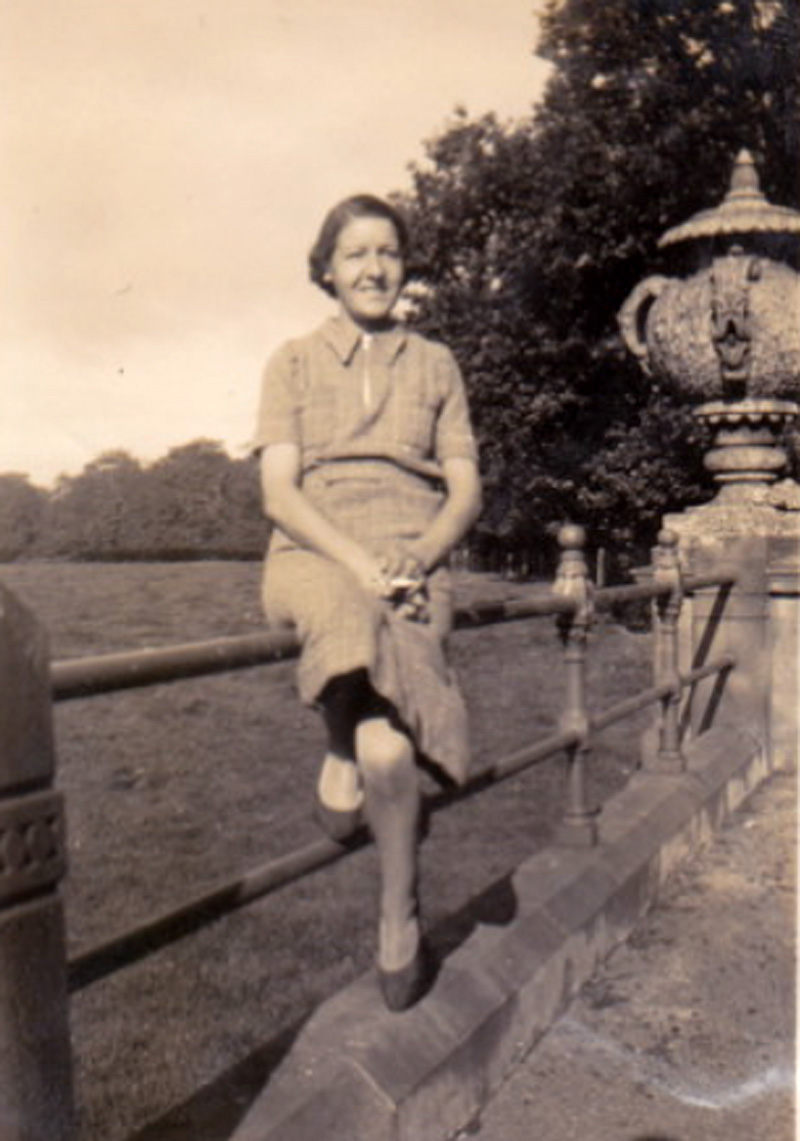
Rosie Holmes at Hoole Hall circa 1930

Charles Edward Holmes was born in 1875 in Tipton, Staffordshire. His father Edward was a railway pointman and Charles became a solicitor. He was the Secretary of Garden City Tenants Ltd which was a building society founded to raise capital for workers' housing. In 1902 he married Rose Hannah Barnett, the daughter of Samuel Barnett who owned the Barnett Brickworks in Tividale. The couple had four children the youngest of whom was Rosie Holmes who is shown at Hoole Hall in about 1930.

Charles died in 1930 and his wife died ten years later in 1940. The family appears to have retained ownership of the Hall as the British Phone Books show that there was a Holmes living at Hoole Hall until about 1970.

== See also ==
- Listed buildings in Hoole Village
- List of works by Thomas Harrison
