= Great Boughton =

Civil parish in Cheshire, England

Coordinates: 53.183°N 2.866°W

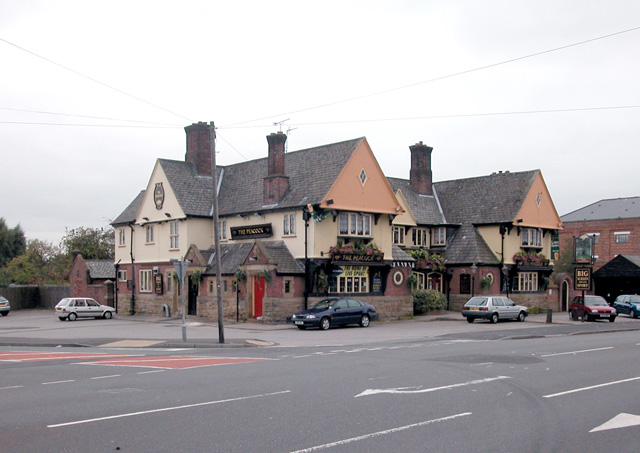
- The Peacock public house, Great Boughton

- Location within Cheshire
- Population: 2,627 (2011)
- OS grid reference: SJ421654
- Civil parish: Great Boughton
- Unitary authority: Cheshire West and Chester
- Ceremonial county: Cheshire
- Region: North West
- Country: England
- Sovereign state: United Kingdom
- Post town: CHESTER
- Postcode district: CH3
- Dialling code: 01244
- Police: Cheshire
- Fire: Cheshire
- Ambulance: North West
- UK Parliament: Chester North and Neston

Great Boughton is a civil parish in the unitary authority of Cheshire West and Chester and the ceremonial county of Cheshire, England. It includes the villages of Boughton Heath and Vicars Cross. It had a population of 2,627 according to the 2011 census.

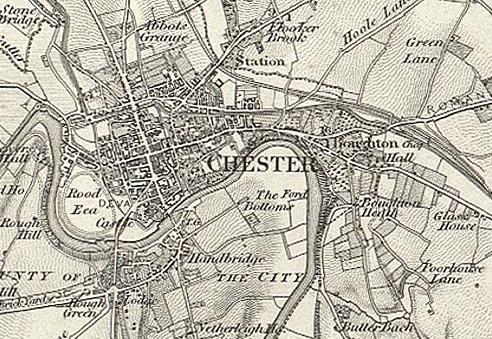
This early Ordnance Survey map shows Great Boughton as being a much smaller settlement just to the east of the city of Chester.

It is sometimes confused with the separate settlement of Boughton, which lies just to the west, within the boundaries of the city of Chester.

In the 1870s, Great Boughton was described as:

a township and a district in Cheshire. The township is in St. Oswald parish, and partly within Chester city; and lies on the Chester and Crewe railway, 1 mile E of Chester.

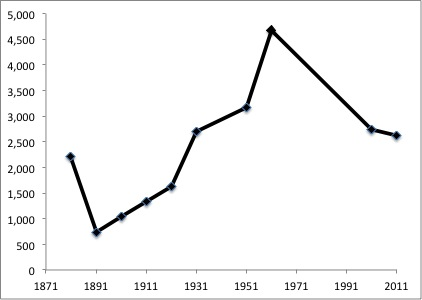
The total population of Great Boughton, Cheshire, as reported by the Census of Population from 1881 to 2011

Great Boughton is a parish that comprises the villages of Boughton Heath, Caldy Valley, Vicars Cross and a section of Huntington. Attractions include the Sandy Lane Aqua Park with ferry to Meadows, Caldy Nature Reserve and Boughton Hall Cricket Club. Great Boughton came into the news when a controversial development at the disused Saighton Camp caused the remodelling of a roundabout. The new design features a hamburger roundabout which has also proved controversial and the roundabout now creates delays especially on the A41 where tailbacks frequently reach 2 miles.

== Governance ==
An electoral ward of the same name exists. This ward had a population of 8,984 at the 2011 census.

== See also ==
- Listed buildings in Great Boughton
