= St Peter's Church, Plemstall =

Coordinates: 53.2251°N 2.8147°W

- St Peter's Church, Plemstall, from the northwest in 2026

- Location in Cheshire
- OS grid reference: SJ 456 701
- Location: Mickle Trafford, Cheshire
- Country: England
- Denomination: Anglican
- Website: https://www.guildensutton-plemstall.church/

History
- Status: Parish church
- Dedication: St Peter

Architecture
- Functional status: Active
- Heritage designation: Grade I
- Designated: 1 June 1967
- Architectural type: Church
- Style: Perpendicular, Gothic Revival

Specifications
- Materials: Red sandstone Welsh slate roof

Administration
- Province: York
- Diocese: Chester
- Archdeaconry: Chester
- Deanery: Chester
- Parish: Plemstall

Clergy
- Rector: currently vacant

St Peter's Church, Plemstall stands in an isolated position at the end of a country lane near the village of Mickle Trafford, Cheshire, England. It is recorded in the National Heritage List for England as a designated Grade I listed building. It is an active Anglican parish church in the diocese of Chester, the archdeaconry of Chester and the deanery of Chester. Its benefice is combined with that of St John the Baptist's Church, Guilden Sutton.

== History ==
The recorded history of the church goes back to the 7th century. The present church is believed to be built on the site where Plegmund, later Archbishop of Canterbury, lived as a hermit in the 9th century. The surrounding land used to be a marsh and the church stands in a slightly elevated area which was known as "The Isle of Chester". The original church was built in the 12th century but the present building dates mostly from the 15th century. This was financed by the Trafford family who lived locally. A tower was added at the west end in 1826. Inscriptions in the church show that there were restorations in 1684, 1711, 1802–03 and 1819. Death watch beetle was found in some roof rafters and the church was re-roofed in 1958. Electric light was installed in the church in 1966 and central hearing was installed in 1968. Since then a toilet and an entrance for disabled people have been built on to the vestry on the north side. In 2006 new lighting was fitted in the church. The pews were removed from the Barnston Chapel and replaced by modern chairs.

== Architecture ==
=== Exterior ===
The church is built in red sandstone with a roof of Welsh slate in late Perpendicular style. The plan consists of a five-bay nave and a chancel in one range, a north aisle with a chapel at its east end, and a south porch. The tower has two bands and a cornice with a castellated parapet and crocketed finials. The porch, which was added in the 16th century, has grooves into which barriers could be inserted to prevent livestock from entering the church.

=== Interior ===
Internally there is a much-restored hammerbeam roof. Rev. Joseph Hooker Toogood, who was the incumbent from 1907 to 1946, was responsible for much of the woodwork in the church. Richards quotes a letter from him dated 1946 in which Rev Toogood stated that he made improvements to the chancel screen. He then made a new altar, the reredos and panelling for the sanctuary. Subsequently he made the lectern, refurnished much of the north chapel and improved the baptistry, including a new cover for the font. He worked on the choirstalls and their canopy and made figures for the sanctuary niches and an alms box. In addition he carved a list of sidesmen on the west wall and a war memorial on the north wall.

The chapel at the east end of the north aisle is known as the Barnston Chapel. It was originally called the Trafford Chapel and was the burial place of the Traffords of Bridge Trafford. The lower part of the chapel screen was carved as a memorial to William de Trafford who was the vicar from 1403 to 1422. The altar in the chapel is Elizabethan in style and was originally the main altar. On the north wall of the chapel are the crests of the Trafford, Barnston and Savage families. It is possible to gain access to the Hurleston family tomb under the altar steps.

The baluster altar rails date from the 18th century and the lower panelling of the chancel from the 15th century. To the right of the altar is a carved list of the rectors from 1291. The font dates possibly from the 16th century and its cover has a carving of the Madonna and Child made by Rev Toogood. In the north aisle is a three-decker pulpit with an adjacent two-decker reader's desk dated 1722. The churchwarden's pew is dated 1697; it is over 7 feet (2 m) in height, has a panelled back and a canopy supported by twisted columns. The organ dates from 1873 and was made by the Chester firm of Charles Whiteley. It was restored in 2003 by David Wells of Liverpool. A gold-painted inscription to the memory of Rev. Toogood hangs on a wooden plaque to the left of the church door. Fragments of glass dating as far back to the 14th century exist in some windows.

There is a ring of three bells, one dated 1635 and the others 1663. The parish registers begin in 1558 and the churchwardens' accounts in 1749. In 1945 the historian Raymond Richards presented to the church five bibles which are kept in a display case in the north aisle. These are a "Breeches" Bible dated 1608, a King James Bible of 1611, a folio edition of the bible printed by Edward Whitchurche in 1549, a black letter bible of 1549 and a King James Bible of 1623.

== External features ==
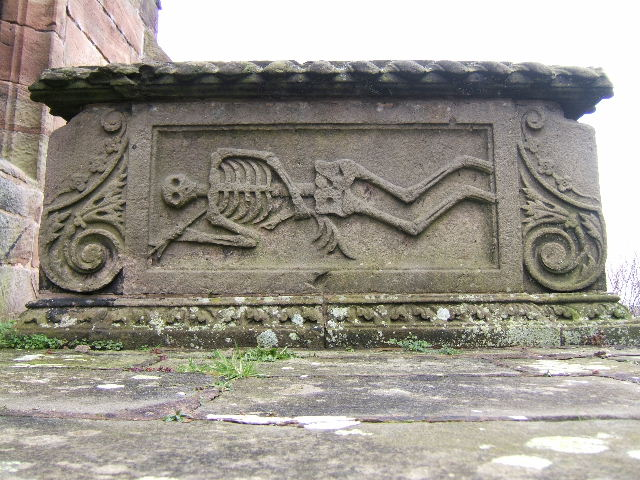
The Hurleston tomb

Attached to east end of church are the vault, the tombchest of and a memorial to the Hurleston family. They date from about 1670 and attached is a memorial plaque dated 1727. The vault cover carries a baroque tombchest on an acanthus plinth in ashlar buff sandstone. The long sides have carved recumbent skeletons, one male and one female, with scrolls at the corners. It is listed at Grade II*. Also in the churchyard are three other items which are listed Grade II. A pedestal cenotaph to the memory of Thomas Cawley and others stands by the chancel door. It is built of ashlar buff sandstone and is dated 1795. An 18th-century baluster sundial in buff sandstone is dated 1730. The west wall and the gate of the churchyard are built respectively from ashlar buff sandstone and wrought iron and date from the 19th century.

== See also ==
- St Plegmund's well
- Grade I listed buildings in Cheshire West and Chester
- Grade I listed churches in Cheshire
- Listed buildings in Mickle Trafford
