= St. Plegmund's well =

Well in Plemstall, Cheshire, England

Coordinates: 53.225317°N 2.817526°W

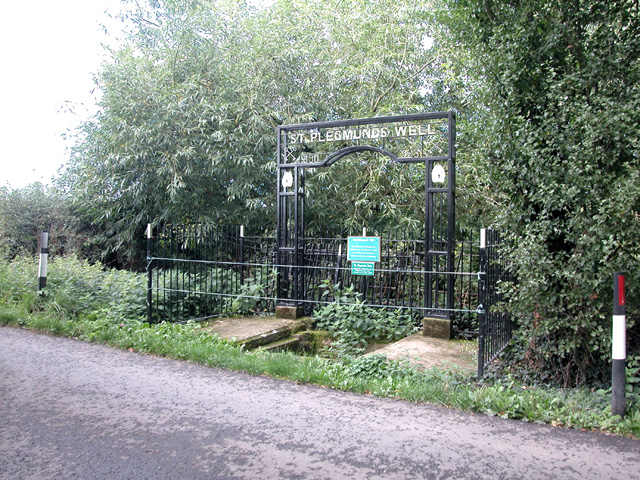
St Plegmund's well

St. Plegmund's well is about 220 yards (201 m) west of St Peter's Church, Plemstall, near the village of Mickle Trafford, Cheshire, England (grid reference SJ454701). It is named after Plegmund, who later became Archbishop of Canterbury and is believed to have lived as a hermit nearby. The earliest documentary evidence of the well is in a quitclaim dated 1301. The well is on the edge of a low rise, to the east of which is one of the channels of the River Gowy. It is one of two holy wells in west Cheshire.

An inscribed sandstone kerb was added in 1907 and dedicated by the Venerable E. Barber, Archdeacon of Chester, on 11 November of that year. A survey of the well carried out in 1995 described it as a square stone-lined pit with two large slabs on either side and two steps down from the southern side beside the road. In the bottom of the well is a ceramic pipe, which has been inserted at a later date. At the time of the survey there was water present up to the level of the first step. The cover slabs show some signs of damage but there was no sign of the kerbs added in 1907.

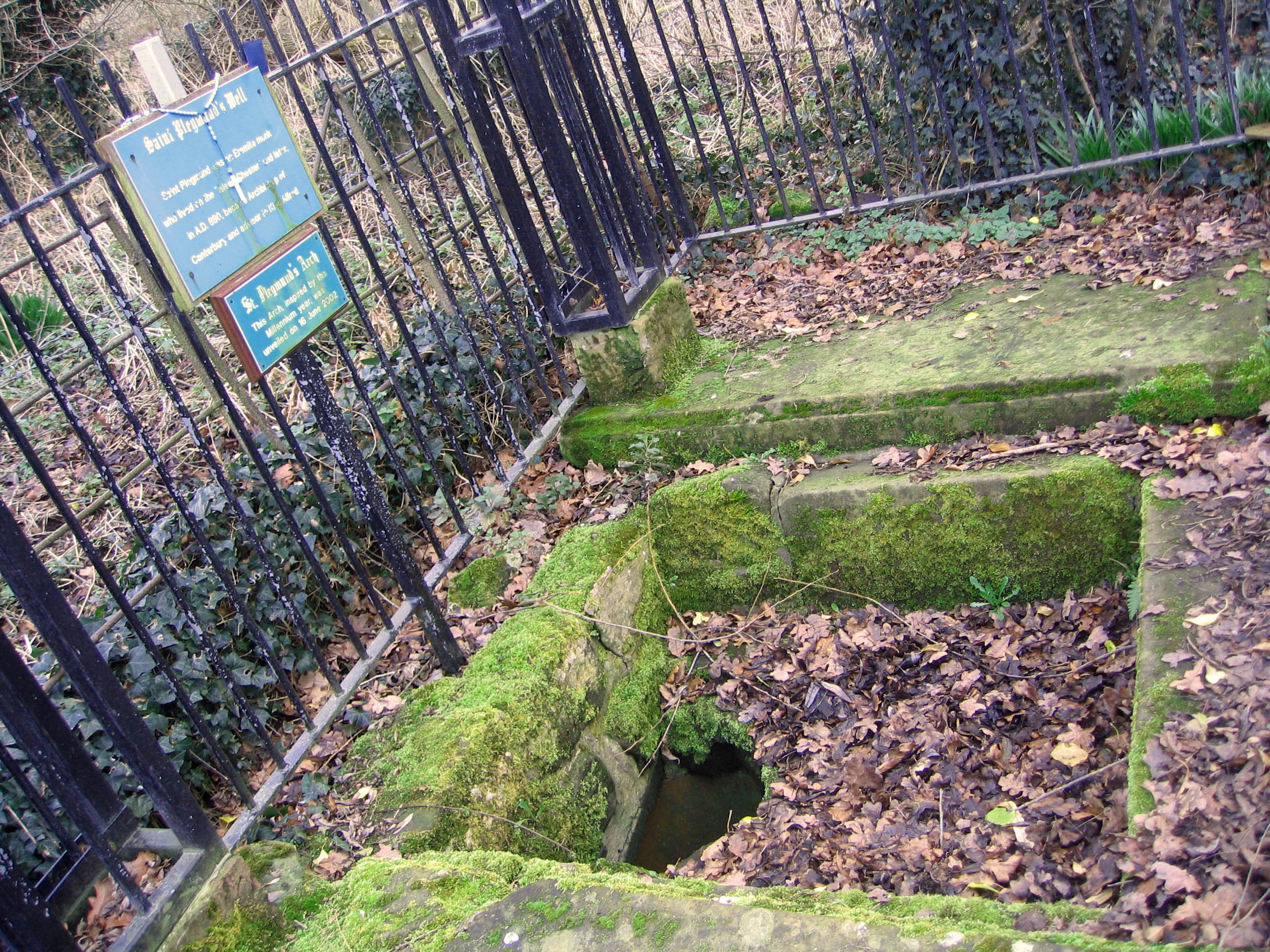
Looking down the well

It is said to have been used for baptisms up to the 20th century. In the 1990s, it was noticed that the hawthorn tree overhanging the well was dressed periodically, and during the later 1990s archaeologists from Chester City Council led local children on a well-dressing walk on St Plegmund's feast day (2 August). This continued until 2000, when a more formal annual well-dressing event was revived.

The well is a scheduled monument.

== See also ==
- Scheduled Monuments in Cheshire (pre-1066)
