= National Communities Resource Centre =

British charity

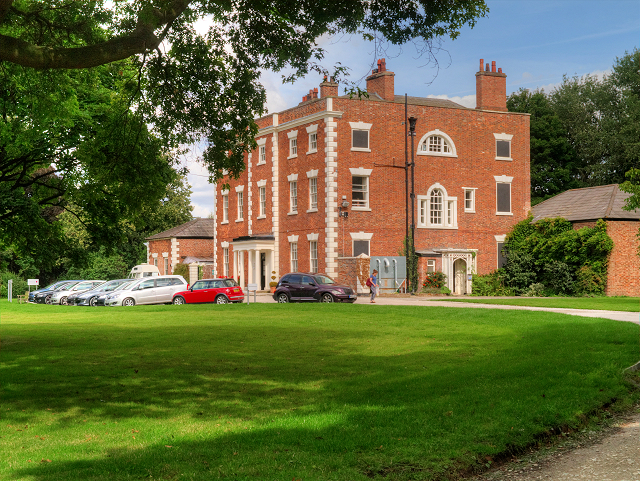
- Founded: 1991
- Founded at: Near Chester, England
- Type: Charity
- Purpose: Community outreach, Education
- Headquarters: Trafford Hall, Wimbolds Trafford, Cheshire, United Kingdom
- Region served: United Kingdom
- Chair of board of trustees: Professor Anne Power
- Website: www.traffordhall.com

The National Tenants Resource Centre (NTR ) is a British charity which was set up in 1991 to offer support and training to residents in low-income areas. It runs courses for tenants and community groups from its premises near Chester. Since 2020 it has been part of Regenda Group, a company which provides and operates affordable housing.

== History ==
The organisation was founded in 1991 by Professor Brian Able-Smith, Professor Anne Power and Lord Richard Rogers as a registered charity and a company limited by guarantee (named National Tenants Resource Centre Ltd until 2006).

In 1995 the charity acquired, with the help of Grand Metropolitan Estates, the 18th-century country house known as Trafford Hall, in extensive grounds some 4 1/2 miles (7 km) northeast of Chester. The house was turned into a training and conference centre, officially opened on 6 December 1995 by Prince Charles, and used by tenants' groups and community organisations.

After the 2011 riots in England, the charity was tasked by the Department for Communities and Local Government to train tenants in an effort to enable the formation of local 'tenant panels' which could tackle problems that arise at a local level such as repairs, estate management and anti-social behaviour.

The NCRC also helped create the Housing Plus Academy alongside the London School of Economics. In partnership with leading social housing providers, the National Housing Federation and the Chartered Institute of Housing, the academy offers information and knowledge exchange for staff and tenants of social landlords.

== Key people ==
Professor Anne Power chairs the NCRC's board of trustees. She is emeritus Professor of Social Policy at the London School of Economics and head of Housing and Communities, a research group there. Lord Richard Rogers was the charity's president until September 2019.

== 2019–2020 restructure ==
In February 2019, the charity's trading company, Trafford Trading Company Limited, ceased to trade and began a winding-up process, with its staff and chief executive made redundant. This resulted in suspension of most of the charity's work except for Housing Plus Academy events which relocated to the London School of Economics. The charity's board sought a restructure, and in December 2020 (after delays caused by the COVID-19 pandemic) the NCRC entered into partnership with Regenda Group, a company providing and operating low-cost housing in north-west England, which has its origins in several housing associations.

In April 2021, Trafford Hall opened as a 53-bed youth hostel managed on behalf of Regenda by the Youth Hostels Association. The NCRC continues to have offices there, and runs a number of residential courses each year.
