= Listed buildings in Great Boughton =

Great Boughton is a former civil parish in Cheshire West and Chester, England. It contained seven buildings that are recorded in the National Heritage List for England as designated listed buildings, all of which are at Grade II. This grade is the lowest of the three gradings given to listed buildings and is applied to "buildings of national importance and special interest". The parish was mainly residential, forming a suburb to the east of Chester, and two of the listed buildings are houses dating from the 18th century. Running through the parish is the Shropshire Union Canal (originally the Chester Canal); associated with this are three listed buildings, two locks and a cottage. The other listed structures are two boundary stones.

Name and location	Photograph	Date	Notes
The Old Glass House; 53.1865°N 2.8502°W	—	Early 18th century	The house was extended and altered in the 19th century. It is built in brick with a slate roof. The house has two storeys, and a four-bay front. It has a two-storey gabled porch with a pointed finial. The windows are sashes, and the chimney pots are in Tudor style.
Woodbank; 53.1882°N 2.8552°W	—	18th century	This originated as a farmhouse and an attached farm building, later converted into two houses and a garage. The façade was added in the 19th century. It is built in stuccoed brick, with slate roofs, and has a rectangular plan. The building is in two storeys, it has a seven-bay front, and a castellated parapet. The windows are sashes, and in the garage is a blocked pitch hole.
Greenfield Lock; 53.18922°N 2.85134°W		c. 1775	The lock was designed by Samuel Weston for the Chester Canal Company. It is built in brick, with red sandstone copings, quoins, and piers. The gates at the west end are wooden, and at the east end are steel gates. There is also a concrete bridge and a slipway.
Tarvin Road Lock; 53.19219°N 2.85959°W		c. 1775	The lock was designed by Samuel Weston for the Chester Canal Company. It is built in brick, with stone copings, quoins, and piers. The gates at the west end are wooden, and at the east end are steel gates from a later date. There is also a 20th-century concrete bridge.
Tarvin Road Lock Cottage; 53.19227°N 2.85953°W		Late 18th century	This originated as a lock keeper's cottage for the Chester Canal Company, and later used as a house. It is built in brick with a slate roof. The house has two storeys, and a three-bay front. The windows are sashes, other than a 20th-century casement window in the right hand bay.
Boundary stone 53.18681°N 2.85027°W	—	1848	The parish boundary stone is located in front of No 127 Whitchurch Road. It consists of a red sandstone block set into the pavement. It is inscribed with the letters C. P., and the year 1848.
Boundary stone 53.18638°N 2.85003°W	—	Mid 19th century	The parish boundary stone is located against the wall of the Old Glass House (No 60 Whitchurch Road). It consists of a semi-cylindrical sandstone block inscribed with the word "Boughton".

== See also ==
- Grade I listed buildings in Cheshire West and Chester
- Grade II* listed buildings in Cheshire West and Chester
- Grade II listed buildings in Chester (east)
- Listed buildings in Christleton
- Listed buildings in Guilden Sutton
- Listed buildings in Huntington
