= Guilden Sutton =

Coordinates: 53.208127°N 2.827048°W

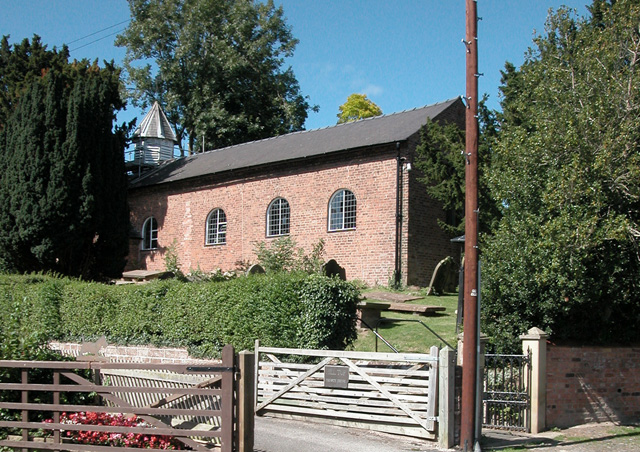
- St John's Church, Guilden Sutton

- Location within Cheshire
- Population: 1,467 (2011 census)
- OS grid reference: SJ448682
- Civil parish: Guilden Sutton
- Unitary authority: Cheshire West and Chester
- Ceremonial county: Cheshire
- Region: North West
- Country: England
- Sovereign state: United Kingdom
- Post town: CHESTER
- Postcode district: CH3
- Dialling code: 01244
- Police: Cheshire
- Fire: Cheshire
- Ambulance: North West
- UK Parliament: Runcorn and Helsby

Guilden Sutton is a civil parish and village in the unitary authority of Cheshire West and Chester and the ceremonial county of Cheshire, England. The village lies approximately 3 miles (5 km) to the east of Chester and is south of the village of Mickle Trafford. The community consists of a church, a primary school, a post office, a pub, a village hall and several local businesses.

The 2001 census recorded the population at 1,525, reducing to 1,467 at the 2011 census.

== History ==
The likely meaning of the name Guilden Sutton is "golden south farm or settlement", derived from the Old English gylden (golden, rich) - sūð (south/southern) - tūn (a settlement, enclosure or farmstead). This could perhaps be in reference to being at the southern extremity of the then Wilaveston Hundred. Since the twelfth century, across a period of five hundred years, the name of the village has been spelt in different ways; such as Guldesocton, Guyldenesutton, Sutton-Gelders and Gilen Sutton.

Guilden Sutton was mentioned in the Domesday Book as Sudtone, under the ownership of the Bishop of Chester and Robert FitzHugh.

Several archaeological artefacts have been found in the vicinity of the village: a bronze coin of Licinius I (AD 307–324) was discovered behind the 'Bird in Hand' public house, a mediaeval lead spindle whorl, four 17th-century swords found in a house cellar, and a cannonball.

Always an agricultural community, the parish even employed the services of a man to prevent cattle straying in the eighteenth century. Although electricity was available from 1925, other essential utilities such as a piped water supply did not extend to the main part of the village until 1945 and gas did not arrive until as late as 1968.

The population of the parish grew considerably in the latter part of the twentieth century, from 442 in 1951 to 1,525 by 2001, due to boundary changes and significant residential development, such as the Oaklands estate by 1970. In the 1950s a large part of the neighbouring civil parish of Hoole was transferred to Guilden Sutton, adding another 209 inhabitants. More boundary changes occurred in 2015, further enlarging the Guilden Sutton civil parish.

== Landmarks ==
The original St John the Baptist's Church was probably built circa 1105. The earliest register of births, marriages and deaths dates back to 1595. The church was damaged in a storm in 1802 and had been rebuilt by 1810. The present church is a designated Grade II listed building.

The former Methodist Chapel was built in 1873; it ceased use as a church in 2010 and is now a house. The original village school was built in 1891 and the present church hall in 1916. The Bird in Hand public house has existed more or less in its present form since 1844, although it is believed to be much older.

== Demography ==
Historical census statistics
Year	1801	1841	1851	1871	1881	1901	1921	1931	1951	1961	2001	2011
Population	158	180	221	234	187	347	368	404	442	718	1,525	1,467

== Governance ==
=== Parish Council ===
Guilden Sutton has an eight-member elected parish council. Elections were contested for the first time in recent history in May 2011 and most recently in May 2019. None of the parish councillors in Guilden Sutton is affiliated with a political party.

=== Cheshire West and Chester Council ===
The unitary authority of Cheshire West and Chester Council replaced Chester City Council and Cheshire County Council on 1 April 2009. Shadow elections to the new unitary authority were held on 1 May 2008, in which Guilden Sutton was part of the Gowy Ward (based on the old Cheshire County Council division of the same name). In May 2011, the ward was renamed 'Chester Villages' and representation was reduced to two councillors. The election was won by Margaret and Stuart Parker for the Conservative Party. In May 2015 the Parish of Guilden Sutton was enlarged to include that portion of Pipers Ash to the east of the A41 road largely bordering Hare Lane and extending to the A51 road at Chester Rugby Club. Local government boundaries were changed again in June 2018, following recommendations from the Local Government Boundary Commission for England. Guilden Sutton became part of the Gowy Rural ward supporting two councillors.

Cheshire West and Cheshire Councillors
Name	Party
Margaret Parker	Conservative
Graham Heatley	Conservative

Six candidates contested the new Gowy Rural ward, of which Guilden Sutton is a part, on 2 May 2019.

Gowy Rural (Great Barrow, Guilden Sutton, Mickle Trafford, Picton and Ellesmere Port east), (2 vacancies)
Party	Candidate	Votes	%	±%
Conservative	Graham Heatley	1262	26.78	
Labour	John Heffernan	668	14.18	
Liberal Democrats	Glyn Jones	355	7.53	
Conservative	Margaret Parker	1272	26.99	
Labour	Jean Hardiman Smith	649	13.77	
Green	Jackie Tait	506	10.74	
Majority				
Turnout				

=== Member of Parliament ===
Guilden Sutton is part of the Runcorn and Helsby constituency, which has been represented by Sarah Pochin of Reform UK since the 2025 Runcorn and Helsby by-election.

== See also ==
- Listed buildings in Guilden Sutton
