= Hoole =

Suburb of Chester, Cheshire, England

Coordinates: 53.197°N 2.862°W

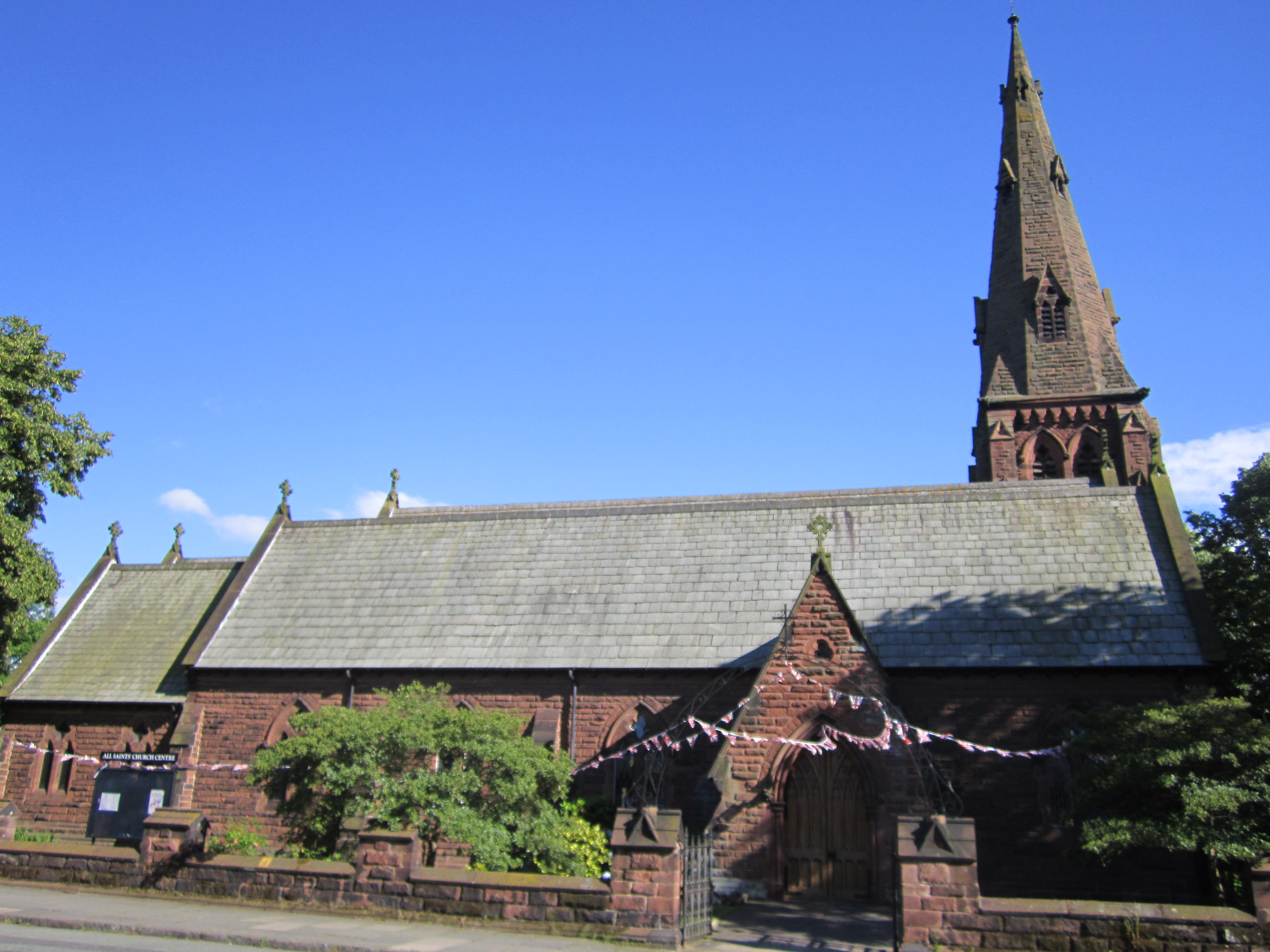
- All Saints' Church, Hoole

- Location within Cheshire
- OS grid reference: SJ425671
- Unitary authority: Cheshire West and Chester
- Ceremonial county: Cheshire
- Region: North West
- Country: England
- Sovereign state: United Kingdom
- Post town: CHESTER
- Postcode district: CH2
- Dialling code: 01244
- Police: Cheshire
- Fire: Cheshire
- Ambulance: North West
- UK Parliament: Chester North and Neston

Hoole is a suburban area to the east of the city of Chester, in Cheshire West and Chester, Cheshire, England. It lies immediately outside the historic city boundary and is contiguous with Newton to the north and Vicars Cross to the south. The suburb is bounded to the east by the A41 road, beyond which lies the separate civil parish of Hoole Village.

Hoole developed largely during the 19th and early 20th centuries and is characterised by Victorian and interwar housing, local shopping streets, and public green spaces.

== History ==
The settlement of Hoole is first recorded in 1119 in the Register of the Abbey of Saint Werburgh. The name derives from the Old English word hol, meaning “hollow”, and is thought to refer to a sunken routeway or “hollow way”, possibly associated with a former Roman road through the area.

On 17 July 2009, an explosion destroyed sixteen flats at Wharton Court on Hoole Lane. More than thirty firefighters attended the incident, which caused extensive damage to the two-storey building.

== Community ==
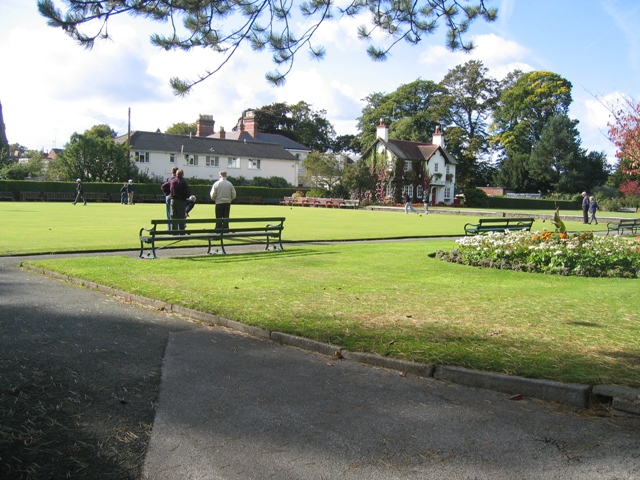
The bowling green and lodge at Alexandra Park in 2008

Hoole is predominantly residential, consisting mainly of Victorian terraced houses and semi-detached homes built during the 1930s. Hoole Road is designated as a conservation area.

Its proximity to Chester city centre, Chester railway station, and the M53 motorway has resulted in a concentration of hotels, guest houses, and bed and breakfast accommodation.

The principal shopping streets are Faulkner Street and Charles Street. Hoole contains a Post Office branch with cash machine facilities. Public open spaces include Alexandra Park, which provides tennis courts, bowling greens, and a children’s play area, and the Coronation Playing Fields. A large area of allotments is accessible from Canadian Avenue and Hoole Lane.

An annual Christmas lights switch-on event is held on Faulkner Street and attracts large crowds. The event celebrated its 20th anniversary in 2019.

== Governance ==
Hoole is administered by Cheshire West and Chester Council as part of the unitary authority area.

=== Administrative history ===
Historically, Hoole was a township. Most of the township lay within the ancient parish of Plemstall in the Broxton Hundred. A small area in the southern corner formed part of the parish of St John the Baptist, Chester, though it lay outside the city’s municipal boundary.

From the 17th century, parishes acquired civil administrative functions under the poor laws. In Hoole, these functions were exercised at township level. In 1866 Hoole became a civil parish following reforms to the legal definition of parishes.

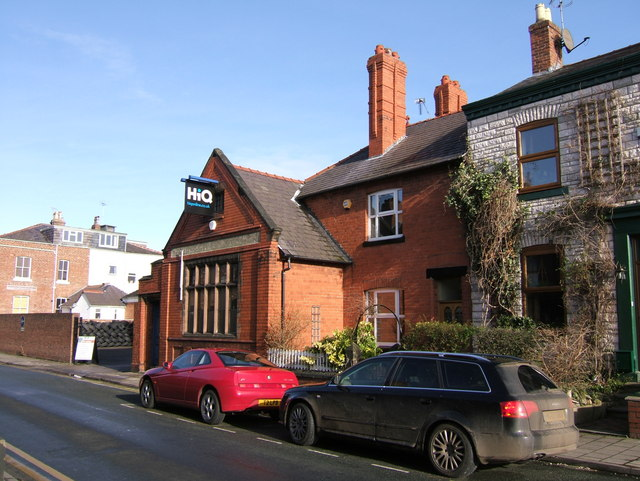
2A Westminster Road, built in 1893 as headquarters of Hoole Local Board

In 1864 a local government district was established for the south-western part of the township, administered by an elected local board. The district did not include the entire township following objections from residents in the more rural north-eastern area. In 1893 the local board constructed new offices at 2A Westminster Road.

Under the Local Government Act 1894, the district became Hoole Urban District. Civil parish boundaries were adjusted to match the district, and the remaining rural area became a separate parish named Hoole Village.

The population of Hoole rose from 177 in 1801 to 9,056 by 1951. Boundary changes in 1936 saw the urban district absorb parts of neighbouring Newton parish and transfer land to the city of Chester.

Hoole Urban District was abolished in 1954. The area west of the A41 was absorbed into Chester, while most of the land east of the road was transferred to Hoole Village, with a smaller section added to Guilden Sutton.

== Places of worship ==
Hoole contains four churches: Anglican (All Saints' Church), Baptist, Methodist and United Reformed. The churches have jointly hosted community events, including the annual “Funday on a Sunday”, which attracted more than 6,000 people in 2006.

== Transport ==
The A56 Hoole Road is the main route through the suburb, linking Chester city centre with the A41, A55 and the M53 motorway. The Millennium Greenway footpath and cycle route follows a former railway trackbed. Chester railway station lies less than 1 mile (1.6 km) from Hoole.

== Notable residents ==
RAF pilot and charity founder Leonard Cheshire was born at 65 Hoole Road on 7 September 1917.

Comedian and musician Russ Abbot (born Russell Allan Roberts, 18 September 1947) was the lead singer of the band Black Abbots before establishing a solo comedy career.

Television chef Ainsley Harriott has been reported to spend time in Hoole, where his partner lives.
