= Tatton =

Tatton may refer to:

- Tatton (UK Parliament constituency), a constituency in Cheshire, England, represented in the United Kingdom House of Commons
- Tatton Park, a country estate in Cheshire, which includes
  - Tatton Hall
  - Tatton Old Hall
  - Tatton Park Gardens
- Tatton, Cheshire, a former civil parish in Cheshire East, largely contained within Tatton Park
- Tatton, New South Wales, a suburb of Wagga Wagga, New South Wales, Australia
- Tatton Park Flower Show, an annual flower show held by the Royal Horticultural Society

== People ==
- Abbi Tatton (born 1975), former Internet reporter
- Arthur Tatton (1811–1885), Irish Anglican priest
- James Tatton (born 1978), English snooker player
- Robert Tatton (1606–1669), High Sheriff of Chester
- Robert Henry Grenville Tatton (1883–1962), High Sheriff of Chester
- William Tatton (disambiguation)
- Tatton Brinton (1916–1985), British politician
- Tatton Sykes (disambiguation)
- William Tatton Brown (1910–1997), English architect
