= Listed buildings in Tatton, Cheshire =

Tatton is a former civil parish in Cheshire East, England. It contained 26 buildings that are recorded in the National Heritage List for England as designated listed buildings. Of these, one is listed at Grade I, the highest grade, two are listed at Grade II*, the middle grade, and the others are at Grade II. The major building in the parish was Tatton Hall, and all the listed buildings in the parish are related to it. These include the hall itself, Tatton Old Hall, the Home Farm, structures in the gardens and park, and lodges at the entrances to Tatton Park.

== Key ==
Grade	Criteria
I	Buildings of exceptional interest, sometimes considered to be internationally important
II*	Particularly important buildings of more than special interest
II	Buildings of national importance and special interest

== Buildings ==
Name and location	Photograph	Date	Notes	Grade
Tatton Old Hall; 53.32790°N 2.36740°W		Early 15th century	This originated as a manor house, and a second wing was added at right angles by 1585. At first it was timber-framed on a stone plinth, but it was later encased in brick, and it has stone-slate roofs. The building has an L-shaped plan. The original wing is in a single storey and contains a medieval hall, and the later wing is in two storeys.	II*
Cruck barn, Tatton Old Hall; 53.32850°N 2.36761°W		Early 17th century	The cruck barn was originally on a farm near Frodsham and was moved here in 1976. Its structure is based on four crucks standing on a sandstone plinth. The walls are timber-framed with brick infill, and the roof is thatched. In the walls are doorways, ventilation slits, and a square pitch hole.	II
North and east walls, eastern kitchen garden, Tatton Hall; 53.33010°N 2.38648°W		Early 18th century	The walls are in brick with stone dressings. The oldest is the east wall, with the north wall dating from the mid-18th and the 19th centuries. The walls are about 10 feet (3.0 m) to 11 feet (3.4 m) high and form an approximately rectangular enclosure. The north wall has ¾ height buttresses.	II
Stable block, Tatton Hall; 53.33065°N 2.38645°W		Late 18th century	The stable block was designed by Samuel Wyatt. It is in brick on a stone base with stone dressings and has a slate roof. The front is in eleven bays. The central three bays and the two end bays are in two storeys, each forming a pavilion with a pyramidal roof. Between these the building is in a single storey. The central pavilion has two pediments, and a lunette, and on the top is a clock and bellcote with a weathervane. The windows are sashes.	II
Stable block and barn, Home Farm, Tatton Hall; 53.33601°N 2.38836°W		Late 18th century	The farm buildings are in brick with stone dressings and a slate roof, and are in two storeys. The stables form an east wing and the barn a south wing at right angles, creating an L-shaped plan. Both have fronts of five bays. The central bay of the stables projects slightly and contains an archway over which is an entablature, a round window, and a cornice. On the ridge is a wooden octagonal dovecote with a weathercock. Elsewhere are mullioned windows and round windows. The barn contains doorways, pitch holes, and ventilation slits.	II
Pigeon loft, Home Farm, Tatton Hall; 53.33606°N 2.38879°W		Late 18th century	The former pigeon loft is a hexagonal structure that has been converted for other uses. It is built in brick with stone dressings, and has a roof of lead and slate. The building is in two storeys and contains a door on the south side. Below the eaves is a ledge and openings for the birds to enter.	II
Tatton Hall; 53.33042°N 2.38349°W		1791	A large country house designed in Neoclassical style by Samuel Wyatt. When Wyatt died in 1807 the building was not finished, and it was completed on a less grand scale by his nephew Lewis Wyatt. An upper storey was added to the family wing in 1860 by G. H. Stokes, and there were further alterations in 1884. The house is built in Runcorn sandstone, has roofs of slate and lead, and parts are faced in yellow terracotta. It consists of a main block, and a family wing to the west. The south front is in seven bays and contains a large Corinthian portico with four monolithic columns. The house is financed on behalf of the National Trust by Cheshire East Council.	I
Orangery, Tatton Hall; 53.32993°N 2.38544°W		1818	The orangery is a conservatory designed by Lewis Wyatt. It is built in sandstone on a stone plinth and has a glass roof. The orangery has a cross-plan, and a front of seven bays, the outer bays being angled. The central three bays project forward, and have monolithic pilasters, over which is an entablature.	II
Mere Lodge; 53.32958°N 2.39685°W		1822	An entrance lodge to Tatton Hall designed by Lewis Wyatt. It is an octagonal structure, built in brick and stone, and with a roof in lead and slate. It is in two storeys, and around it is a colonnade carried on Tuscan columns. The doorway and the ground floor windows have arched heads; the windows in the upper floor are rectangular. To the north is a later single-storey extension.	II
Walls, western kitchen garden, Tatton Hall; 53.32903°N 2.38815°W		Early 19th century	The walls are in brick with stone capping. They are between 7 feet (2.1 m) and 10 feet (3.0 m) high, and form a rectangular shape. The gates and gate piers date from the late 19th century. The piers are in brick on stone bases, and the gates, with an overthrow, are in iron.	II
Temple, Tatton Hall; 53.32605°N 2.38395°W		1830s	This is a garden ornament at the end of the Broad Walk. It was designed by William Cole, and based on the Choragic Monument of Lysicrates. It is a circular stone structure standing on a square stepped base. On a circular plinth there are six Corinthian columns that carry an entablature, and at the apex is a floral decoration.	II
South Lodge; 53.32563°N 2.39118°W		c. 1830–40	An entrance lodge to Tatton Hall, it is built in brick with a slate roof. It is in two storeys, and has a rectangular plan with a half-hexagon bay at the southeast end. The windows on the long sides are casements, and in the bay are sashes. There is also a verandah carried on wooden posts.	II
Stove wall and hothouses, Tatton Hall; 53.32923°N 2.38761°W		Mid-19th century	The wall is in brick and is surmounted by chimney pots. There are two lean-to hothouses on the south face of the wall; they are in timber and glass.	II
South wall, eastern kitchen garden, Tatton Hall; 53.32955°N 2.38693°W		19th century	The kitchen garden wall is built in brick with stone dressings. Along its south face are 13 buttresses on which are urns with stout stems and gadrooned lower bodies. The gateway has rusticated quoins and a wrought iron gate.	II
Walls to service court, Tatton Hall; 53.33069°N 2.38557°W		19th century	The wall is in brick with stone capping, and is curved at the ends. It is about 12 feet (3.7 m) high, and along it are buttresses. There are two gateways, the one at the west end is without piers, the other has plain piers with domed tops.	II
Shinto Temple, Tatton Hall; 53.32642°N 2.38530°W		19th century	This is a structure in the Japanese Garden that was brought from Japan when the garden was created in 1910. It is built in wood with dressings in stone and bronze and with a shingle roof. The temple is square, in a single storey, on a raised platform approached by seven steps. Across the front are four posts between which are screens with rectangular holes, behind which was two more screens. Around the base of the roof are round bronze bolt plates, and the roof has a decorated ridge.	II
Birkin Bridge North Lodge; 53.35058°N 2.35574°W	—	19th century	An entrance lodge to Tatton Hall built in brick on a stone plinth. It has a slate roof, and is in two storeys. On the drive front is a gabled porch, and the gables at the sides are pedimented. The windows are casements. By the porch is a low stone wall with a pier at both ends.	II
Birkin Bridge South Lodge; 53.35052°N 2.35599°W	—	19th century	An entrance lodge to Tatton Hall built in brick on a stone plinth. It has a slate roof, and is in two storeys. On the drive front is a gabled porch, and the gables at the sides are pedimented. The windows are casements. By the porch is a low stone wall with a pier at both ends.	II
Palm house (or fernery), Tatton Hall; 53.32987°N 2.38592°W		1859	This was built to house tree-ferns from New Zealand, and was designed by G. H. Stokes. It is in brick, partly rendered with stone dressings, and has a roof of cast iron and glass. The building has an L-shaped plan, with a square hall at the west, and a wing to the east. There are no windows, and most of the building has a modillion cornice. On the hall are four iron finials.	II*
Upper terrace wall, Tatton Hall; 53.33022°N 2.38333°W		c. 1860	The terrace wall was designed by Joseph Paxton. It is in sandstone and marble, rusticated and with moulded capping stones. There is a central stairway with a landing halfway down. On the terrace wall and on the walls flanking the stairway are piers carrying urns decorated with gadrooning, vine trails, and egg and dart carving.	II
Flight of steps, Tatton Hall; 53.33014°N 2.38327°W		c. 1860	The steps leads down from the intermediate to the lower terrace. They were designed by Joseph Paxton, and are in sandstone. There are three flights of six steps each, with landings between. At the top of the steps is a pair of marble urns with gadrooned bodies.	II
Pool wall and fountain, Tatton Hall; 53.32999°N 2.38318°W		c. 1860	The pool wall is in sandstone and was designed by Joseph Paxton. It is square with bowed centres on each side. The marble statue of Triton was added in 1883 by the 2nd Baron Egerton. Triton has a trail of seaweed over his left shoulder and is holding a shell to his lips.	II
Eastern vase, lower terrace, Tatton Hall; 53.33002°N 2.38299°W		c. 1860	The vase was designed by Joseph Paxton, and is in cement. It stands on a square plinth, and consists of fluted base in the shape of a wine glass, a stem, and a gadrooned bowl, with egg and dart decoration. It has a copper lining.	II
Western vase, lower terrace, Tatton Hall; 53.32995°N 2.38335°W		c. 1860	The vase was designed by Joseph Paxton, and is in cement. It stands on a square plinth, and consists of fluted base in the shape of a wine glass, a stem, and a gadrooned bowl, with egg and dart decoration. It has a copper lining.	II
Lower terrace wall and balustrade, Tatton Hall; 53.32983°N 2.38323°W		c. 1860	The terrace wall was designed by Joseph Paxton. The balustrade dates from 1883 and was designed by the 2nd Baron Egerton. The wall is in rusticated sandstone, and the balustrade in terracotta. They are divided by piers carrying vases with moulded stems, gadrooned lower bodies and leaf carving.	II
Pool and fountain, Tatton Hall; 53.32928°N 2.38572°W		c. 1860	Built in sandstone, the pool is circular and its rim is decorated with a petal motif. In the centre is a pedestal carrying two bowls at different levels. The column has leaf motifs on the base, and its body is spirally fluted. Both bowls are gadrooned with a petal motif at the lip.	II

== See also ==
- Listed buildings in Rostherne
- Listed buildings in Mere
- Listed buildings in Knutsford
- Listed buildings in Mobberley
- Listed buildings in Ashley
