= Tatton, Cheshire =

Former civil parish in Cheshire, England

Coordinates: 53.325°N 2.371°W

Tatton
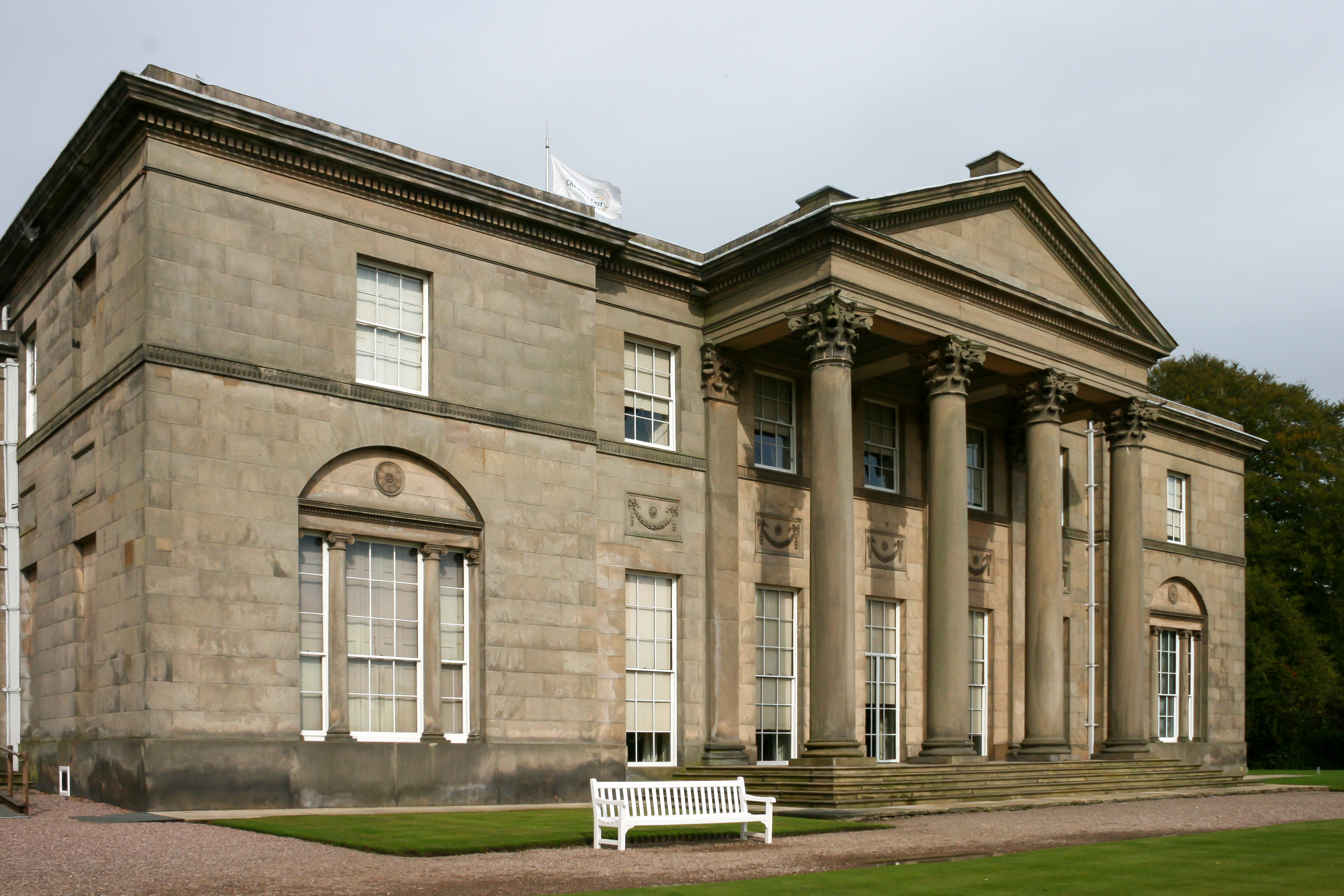
- Tatton Hall

- Location within Cheshire
- Population: 35 (2001)
- OS grid reference: SJ752809
- Civil parish: Millington and Rostherne
- Unitary authority: Cheshire East
- Ceremonial county: Cheshire
- Region: North West
- Country: England
- Sovereign state: United Kingdom
- Post town: KNUTSFORD
- Postcode district: WA16
- Dialling code: 01625
- Police: Cheshire
- Fire: Cheshire
- Ambulance: North West
- UK Parliament: Tatton

Tatton is a former civil parish, now in the parish of Millington and Rostherne, in the Cheshire East district and ceremonial county of Cheshire in England. It lay to the north of Knutsford and mostly covered Tatton Park. At the 2001 census, it had a population of 35. The parish did not have a parish council.

== History ==
Tatton was formerly a township in the parish of Rostherne, from 1866 Tatton was a civil parish in its own right, on 1 April 2023 the parish was abolished to form "Millington and Rostherne".

== See also ==
- Listed buildings in Tatton, Cheshire
- Tatton Park
- Tatton Park Gardens
- Tatton Park Flower Show
