= Tatton Park Gardens =

Gardens in Cheshire, England

Coordinates: 53.329°N 2.385°W

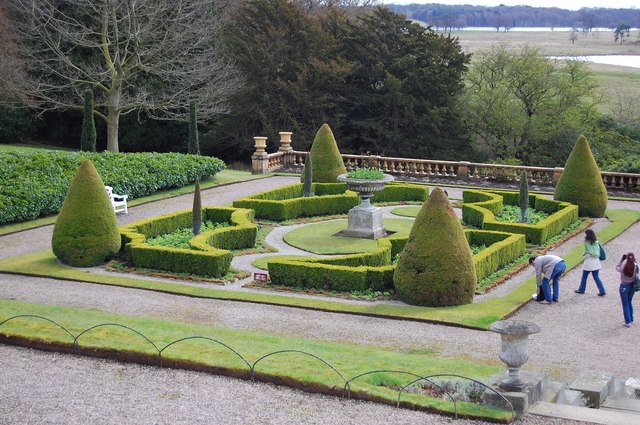
Lower terrace of the Italian Garden

Tatton Park Gardens consist of formal and informal gardens in Tatton Park to the south of Tatton Hall, Cheshire, England (grid reference SJ744814). Included in the gardens are an Italian garden, a walled garden, a rose garden, and the Japanese garden. The buildings in the garden are the Conservatory, the Fernery and the Showhouse. The gardens are owned by the National Trust and administered by Cheshire East Council. They are on the National Register of Historic Parks and Gardens and have been designated at Grade II*. The gardens are open to the public at advertised times.

== History ==
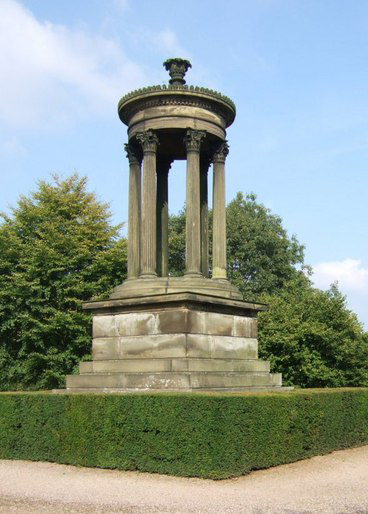
Monument

The first formal gardens were created around the early 18th-century house and consisted of a walled garden to the south of the house, a formal semicircular pond to its north and formal lines of trees to the east and west. Later Samuel Wyatt set out an avenue of beeches to the south, which is now the Broad Walk. An arboretum was created during the 18th century and additions have been made to it since. The earliest reference to the arboretum is in 1795 when between five and ten species were present. The first formal garden to be created for the present house was Charlotte's Garden, designed by Lewis Wyatt in 1814. Lewis also designed the sandstone Conservatory, which was originally joined to the house by a glass passageway. This was also known as the Orangery because for a time it was used for growing oranges. In the 1830s, a copy of the Choragic Monument of Lysicrates in Athens was placed at the end of the Broad Walk. Gardens were established along the sides of the Broad Walk, including the Leech Pool and the area containing the Golden Brook.

In 1847, the terraces to the south of the house were laid out as an Italian Garden by Edward Milner to a design by Joseph Paxton. Later in the century, in 1883, Wilbraham Egerton added the stone balustrade. The statue of Neptune, which came from Venice, was added in 1920. Over the years changes have been made to this garden, and it was restored to its original design in 1986. In 1859, the Fernery had been built to a design by George Stokes, Paxton's assistant and son-in-law, to the west of the Conservatory to house tree ferns from New Zealand. The Fernery was seen in the TV miniseries Brideshead Revisited.

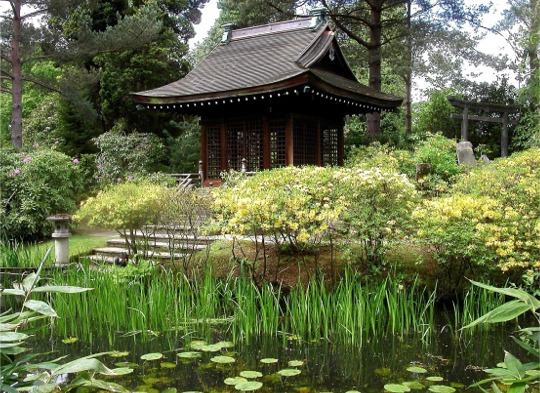
Japanese Garden showing the Shinto Shrine

In 1910, inspired by a visit to the Anglo-Japanese Exhibition in London, Alan Egerton, 3rd Baron Egerton created a Japanese garden with strong western influences, making it a prime example of the Anglo-Japanese style. Artefacts within the garden, including the Shinto shrine, are believed to have been brought from Japan for the construction of the garden.

In 1913, Lord Egerton laid out the Rose Garden for his wife which contained a pool for bathing. Maintenance work in this garden had to be completed by 10.00 am. to allow Lady Egerton to enjoy it without being disturbed. Later in the 20th century, Maurice Egerton, 4th Baron Egerton built the African Hut to the east of the Broad Walk as an association with his visits to Africa. He also planted large numbers of azaleas and rhododendrons.

By the end of the 20th century, the Japanese Garden had become overgrown and it was restored in 2001. Since then the kitchen garden has been restored and the head gardener is planning to construct a new garden to reflect garden design in the 20th and 21st centuries.

== Layout ==
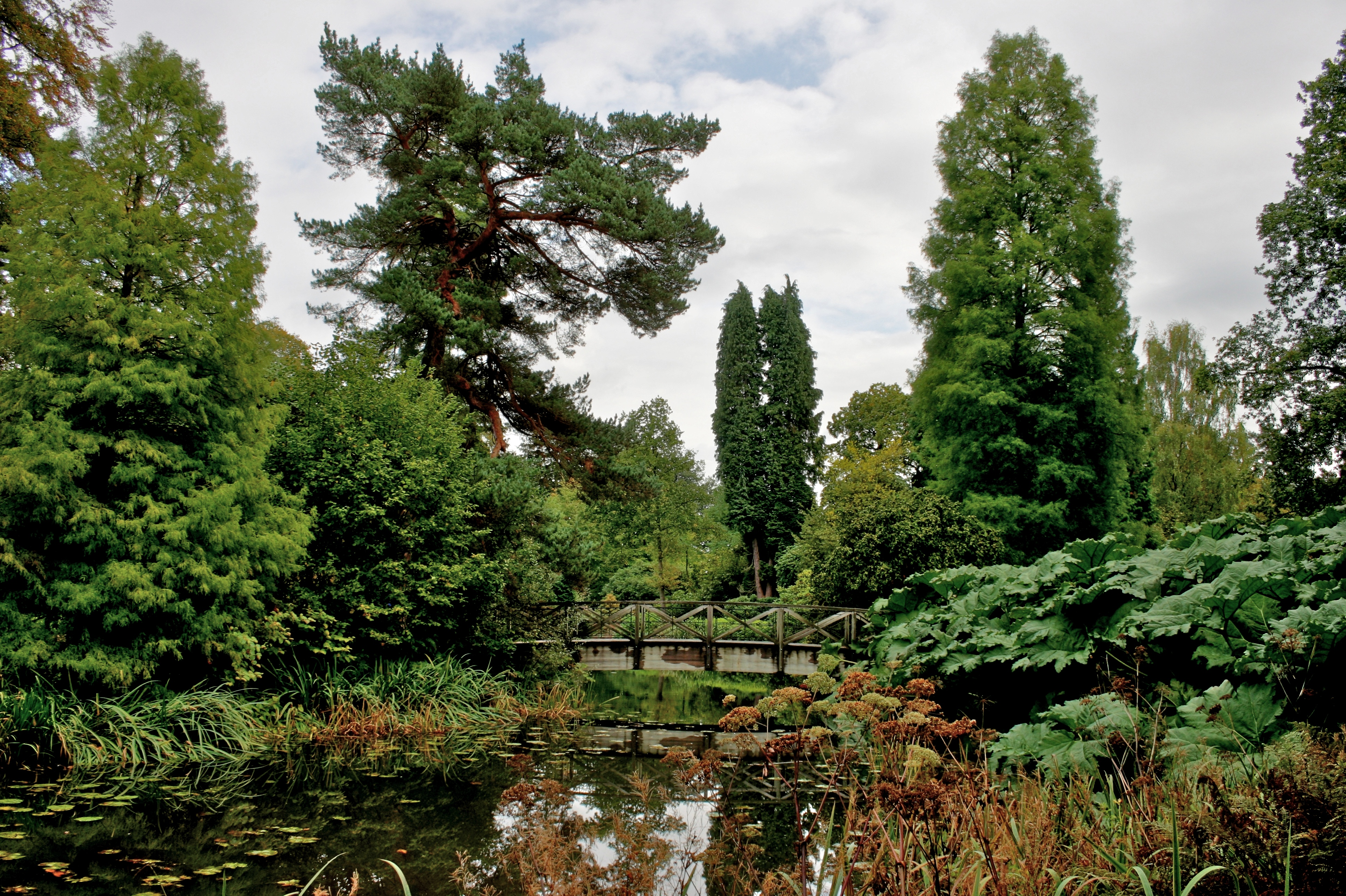
Pond at Tatton Park

The present garden entrance leads from the stable yard into the Walled Garden. On top of the north-facing wall are objects which look like urns, but which are actually chimney pots for what was once a heated wall. The ancillary buildings, including the mushroom sheds, onion stores, barns and glasshouses, have been restored to their former uses. The vegetable garden contains varieties of plants which were known to have been grown at Tatton in the Edwardian era. Some of the fruit in the garden was also grown during that time, while other varieties of fruit had been grown elsewhere in Cheshire. The glasshouses contain a representation of what would have been originally grown in them, including a restored pinery vinery for growing pineapples.

The Walled Garden leads into the "Pleasure Gardens", which were for enjoyment rather than utility. These contain the L Borders which include plants formally arranged to replicate the style of border developed by Gertrude Jekyll. To the south of the L Borders is Charlotte's Garden. This was designed as a Gardenesque type of garden, including a conservatory, an arbour, a fountain, a rockery and a snake path. These five elements can still be found in this garden. The L Border, the Broad Walk and Beech Avenue form the main path through the gardens to the south which lead to the Monument. Opposite Charlotte's Garden is the Topiary which leads to the Rose Garden. This garden contains artefacts, including a Tea House, many of which were taken from the estate of Rostherne Manor. To the south of the Rose Garden is the Tower Garden, which contains a brick tower whose original purpose was to watch for sheep-stealing on the park land. This garden also contains articles from Rostherne Manor. Along the western border of the garden is the Arboretum, which contains 880 plants in 281 species. Its important trees include a Giant Redwood, a Weymouth Pine, a Mexican White Pine, an Ernest's Fir, and a Chilean Incense Cedar.

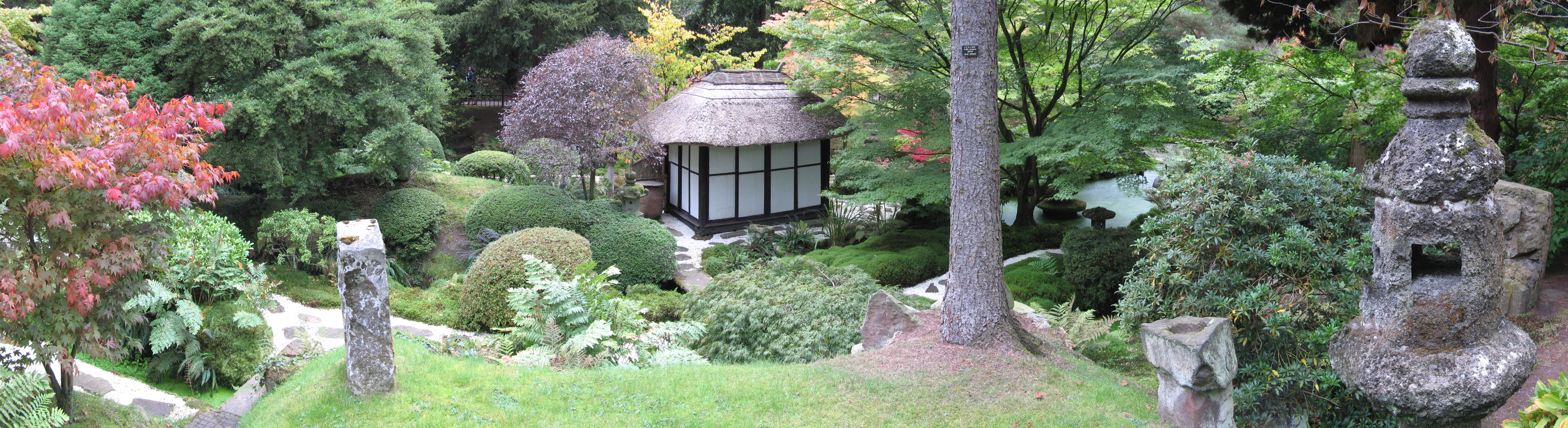
Japanese Garden in the Anglo-Japanese style

The Japanese Garden is to the west of the southern end of the Broad Walk and is considered to be the finest Japanese garden in the United Kingdom, if not in Europe. It is an example of the Anglo-Japanese style. Artefacts in the garden include a Shinto Shrine, a tea house, a bridge over the Golden Brook, and a number of lanterns. The garden contains plants, stones and rocks which have been placed to provide a natural balance. The stones and rocks are selected for their shapes, and a mound has been formed to replicate Mount Fuji with its snow-capped summit. The plants include specimens of Japanese maple and various mosses. To the east of the Broad Walk is Maurice Egerton's African Hut. To the north of this is the Maze, which is planted with hornbeam and beech.

To the southeast of Tatton Hall is the Italian Garden, a formal garden on two terraces. Its centrepiece is the statue of Neptune, which is unusual in that its pipework is visible at the back. To the south of the east end of the family wing are the Conservatory, the Fernery, and the Showhouse.

== Present day ==
The gardens are owned by the National Trust and administered by Cheshire East Council. They are open to the public at advertised times. The Fernery still contains tree ferns and the Showhouse has changing displays of flowering plants. Produce from the Walled Garden can be purchased in the garden shop. A group of volunteers work to maintain the gardens. Courses are held on various aspects of gardening.
