= William Tatton (disambiguation) =

William Tatton (1659–1736) was a British Army general.

William Tatton may also refer to:

- William Egerton (originally named William Tatton; 1749–1806), British politician
- William Tatton Egerton, 1st Baron Egerton (1806–1883), British peer and politician

== See also ==
- Tatton (disambiguation)
- Egerton family
