= Tatton Old Hall =

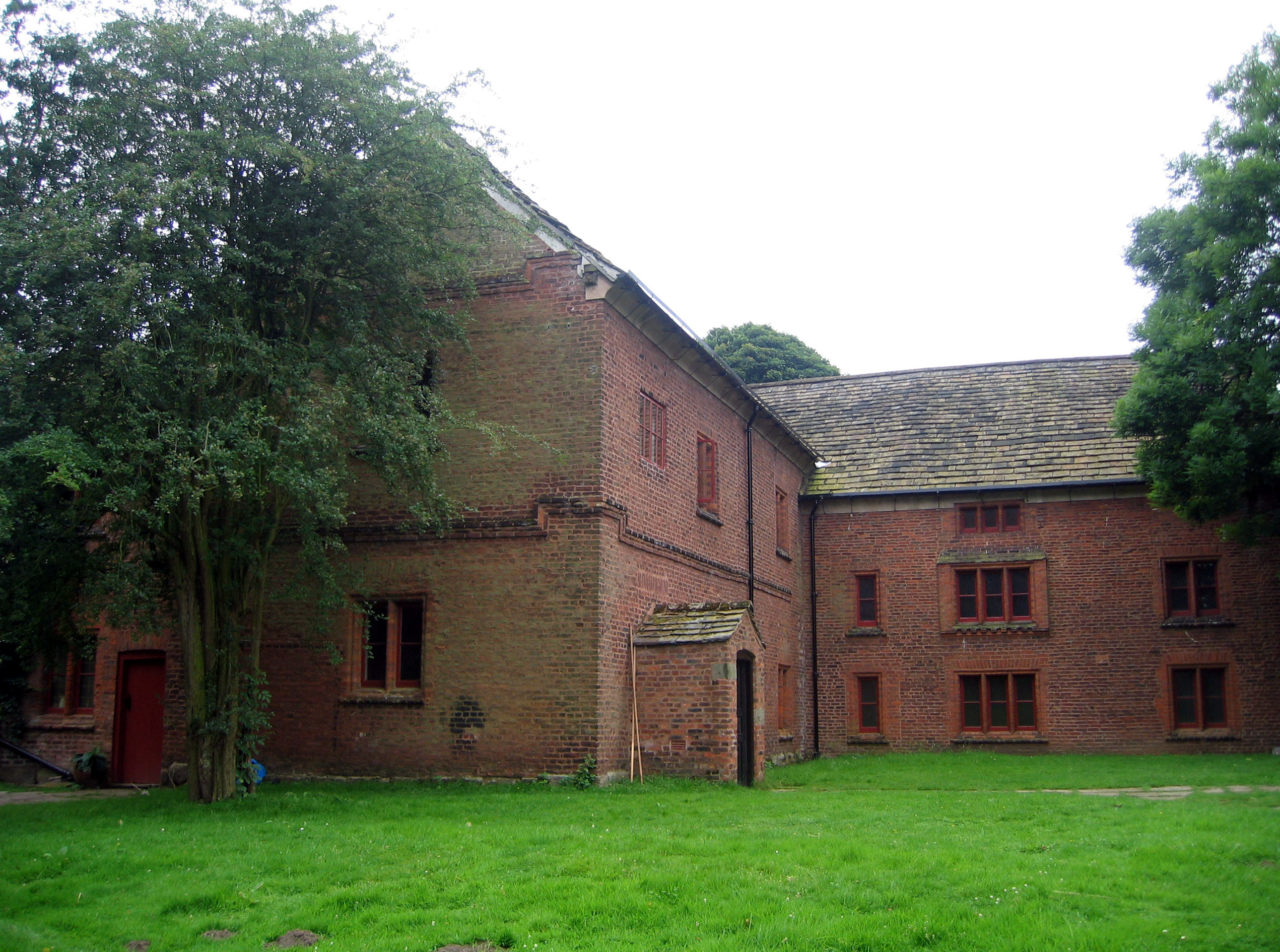
- Tatton Old Hall

- Location in Cheshire
- 53.3279°N 2.3674°W
- Location: Tatton Park near Knutsford, Cheshire, England
- OS grid reference: SJ 756 812

Listed Building – Grade II*
- Designated: 5 March 1959
- Reference no.: 1329674

Tatton Old Hall is a historic building in Tatton Park near Knutsford, Cheshire, England. It is designated by English Heritage as a Grade II* listed building which is owned by the National Trust and administered in conjunction with Cheshire East Council. It is also known as one of the most haunted houses in Britain and is home to The Haunted Hunts official haunted collection. Paranormal investigations take place on a monthly basis under the guidance of The Haunted Hunts team. Its site is a Scheduled Ancient Monument.

== History ==
The hall stands on a site near the village of Tatton, which has since disappeared. It was built as a manor house around the start of the 15th century by either the Stanley family or Sir Richard Brereton. By 1585 a two-storey wing had been added at a right angle to the original house by Sir Thomas Egerton, Lord Chancellor of England, who in 1598 bought it from his half sister Dorothy Brereton. Sir Thomas and his children rarely visited the estate and it was rented to tenants. In the 18th century, a new hall was built on the site of the present Tatton Hall. The old hall was used as a farmhouse, and then a century later converted into three estate cottages. It remained in the possession of the Egerton family until 1958 when it was given to the National Trust.

== Architecture ==
The hall is built in red brick with a stone slate roof. It was originally timber-framed, but this was replaced by brick in the late 17th or early 18th century. The hall is L-shaped and externally appears to have two storeys. Internally the floors which were added to the older hall have been removed, exposing the complex wooden roof. This has a carved wall plate, carved beams and three tiers of quatrefoil wind braces. The hall contains a gallery which was added in the 20th century. The newer wing retains its two floors and is divided into separate rooms.

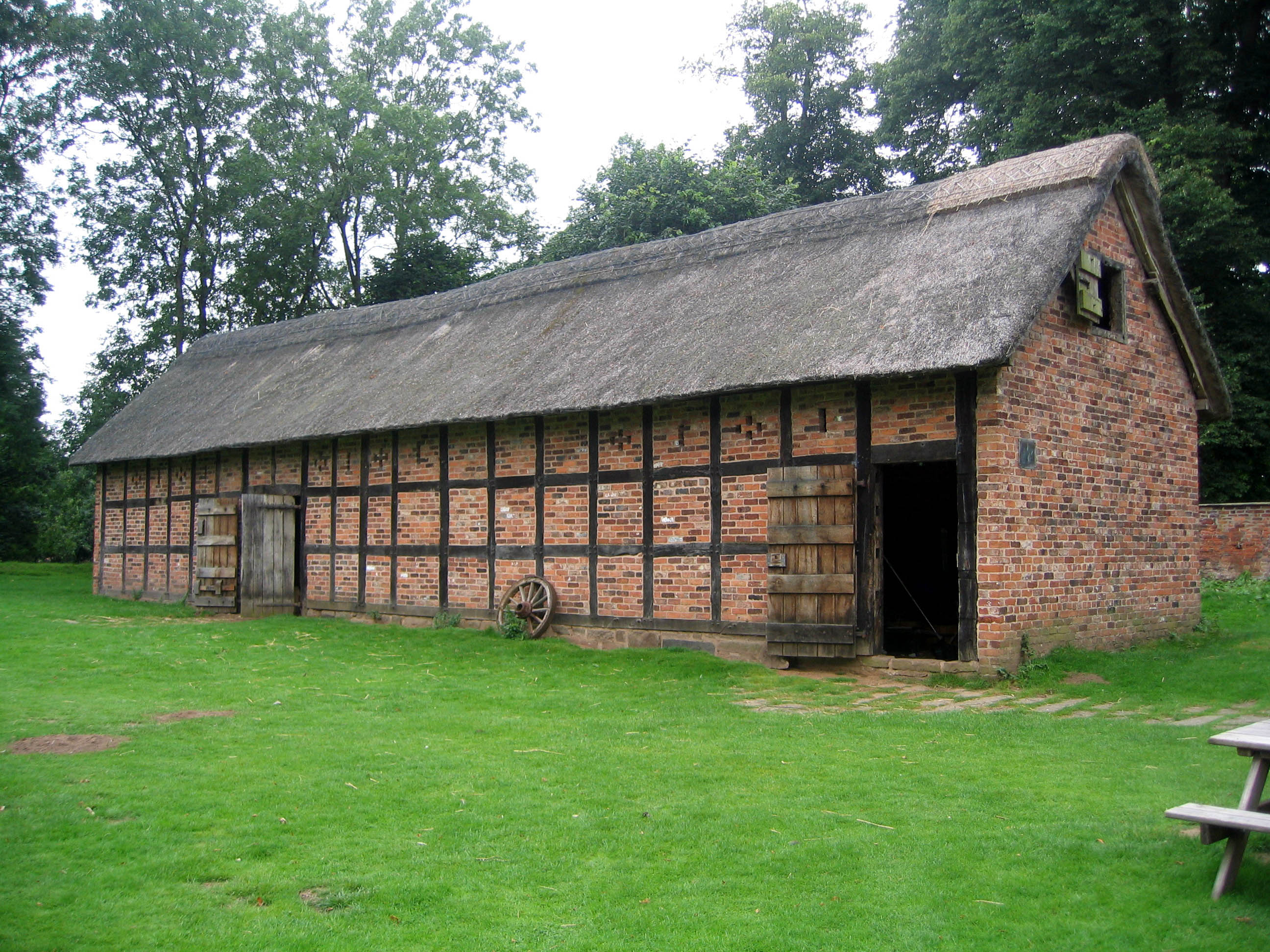
Cruck barn

== Cruck barn ==
In the grounds of the hall is a cruck barn dating from the beginning of the 17th century which was originally in a farm at Frodsham, Cheshire. In a dilapidated state, it was removed from its original site in 1976 and rebuilt and restored at Tatton. The barn is 70 feet (21 m) long and contains four crucks on sandstone plinths. The long walls of the barn are timber-framed with brick infill on a stone base and the short sides are in plain brick. The roof is thatched in Norfolk reed with sedge on the ridge. On the southeast front are two double doors and one single door; on the northwest front is one single door. Internally, cambered ties have been inserted between the crucks. The barn is listed at Grade II.

== See also ==
- Listed buildings in Tatton, Cheshire
