= Tatton Hall =

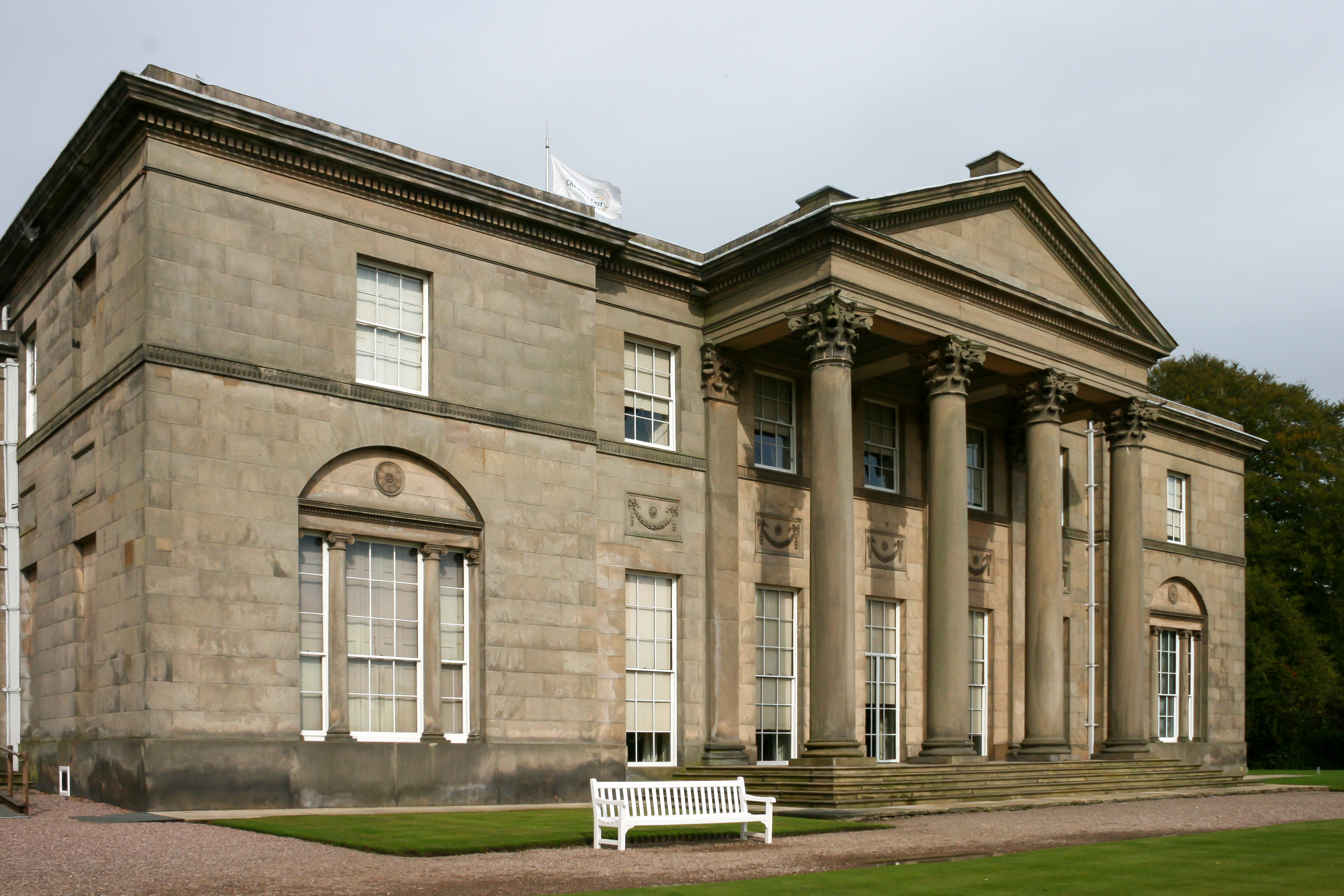
- South face of Tatton Hall

- Location in Cheshire
- 53.3304°N 2.3835°W
- Location: Tatton Park, Cheshire, England
- OS grid reference: SJ 745 815

History
- Built: c. 1716
- Built for: John Egerton
- Rebuilt: 1770s–1810s

Site notes
- Architect(s): Thomas Farnolls Pritchard; Samuel Wyatt; Lewis William Wyatt; G. H. Stokes
- Architectural style: Neoclassical
- Governing body: National Trust; Cheshire East Council

Listed Building – Grade I
- Designated: 5 March 1959
- Reference no.: 1329670

Tatton Hall is a country house in Tatton Park near Knutsford, Cheshire, England. It is designated as a Grade I listed building, owned by the National Trust and managed under lease by Cheshire East Council, and open to the public.

== History ==
The original manor house in Tatton Park was Tatton Old Hall. Around 1716 a new hall was built in a more elevated position on the site of the present mansion some 0.75 miles (1 km) to the west. This house was a rectangular block of seven bays with three storeys. From 1758 the owner Samuel Egerton began to make improvements to the house, in particular a rococo interior to his drawing room (now the dining room), designed by Thomas Farnolls Pritchard.

During the 1770s Samuel Egerton commissioned Samuel Wyatt to design a house in Neoclassical style. Both Samuel Egerton and Samuel Wyatt died before the house was finished, and it was completed (1807–16), on a reduced scale, by Wilbraham Egerton and Lewis William Wyatt, Samuel Wyatt's nephew. Samuel Wyatt had planned a house of eleven bays, but Lewis reduced this to seven. Wilbraham bought a number of fine paintings, and many items of furniture made by Gillows of Lancaster.

In 1861–62 an upper floor was added to the family wing to a design by G. H. Stokes. In 1884 a family entrance hall was added to the north face, and a smoking room to the extreme west of the family wing, and electricity was installed in the hall.

During the later part of the 19th century Wilbraham Egerton, 1st Earl Egerton, hosted large house parties in the hall. Eminent guests included the Prince and Princess of Wales in 1887, and at later dates the Shah of Persia and the Crown Prince of Siam. The last member of the Egerton family to live in the hall was Maurice Egerton. He made a large collection of objects from around the world, some which are on display in the hall. On his death in 1958 Maurice Egerton bequeathed the mansion and gardens to the National Trust.

== Exterior ==
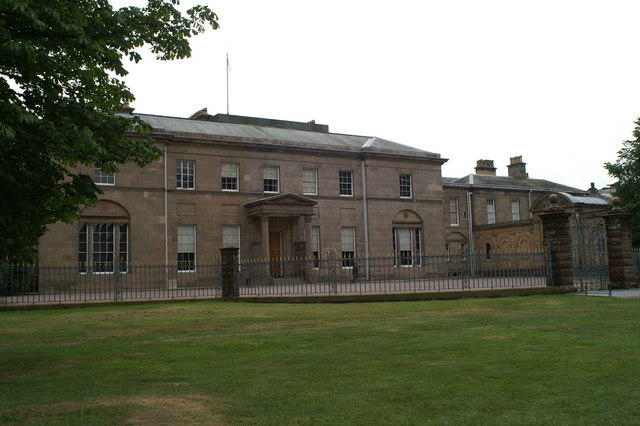
The north face of Tatton Hall.

The main body of the hall and the family wing to the west, both in two storeys, are built in ashlar Runcorn sandstone with slate and lead roofs. The additions of 1884 (family entrance hall and smoking room) are faced in yellow terracotta. The south front of the hall has seven bays. At its centre is a large Corinthian portico with four monolithic columns. The north front is simpler in design, also with seven bays, and it has a pedimented porch with two columns. The east front has five bays with Corinthian pilasters on a slightly projecting plinth and an entablature above. The family wing has seven bays. The south front has a Tuscan colonnade on the lower storey and an Ionic colonnade, verandah and balustrade above.

== Interior ==
Not all of the rooms are open to the public. The major rooms that are open are described below.

=== Hall ===
==== Ground floor ====
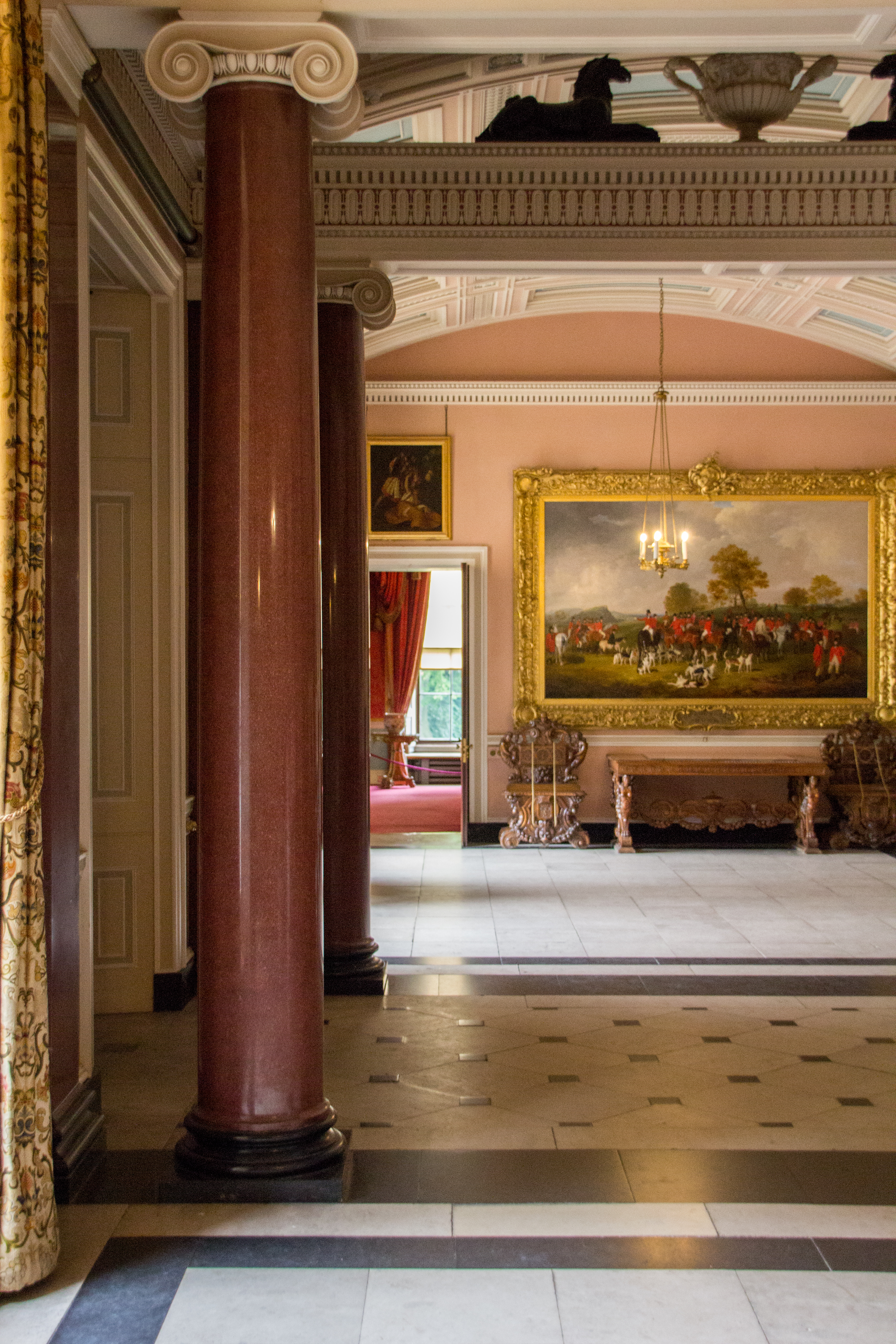
The Entrance Hall

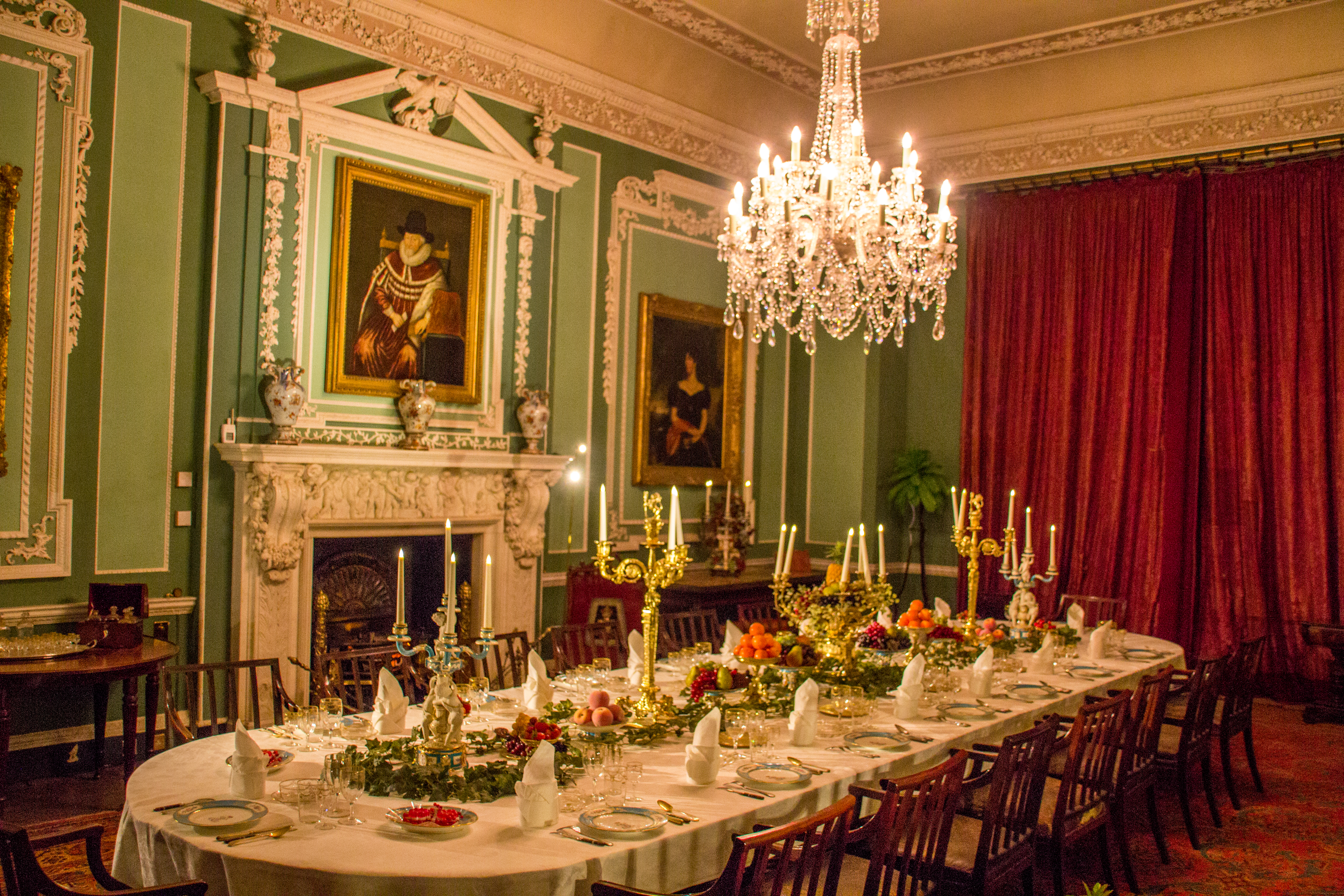
The Dining Room

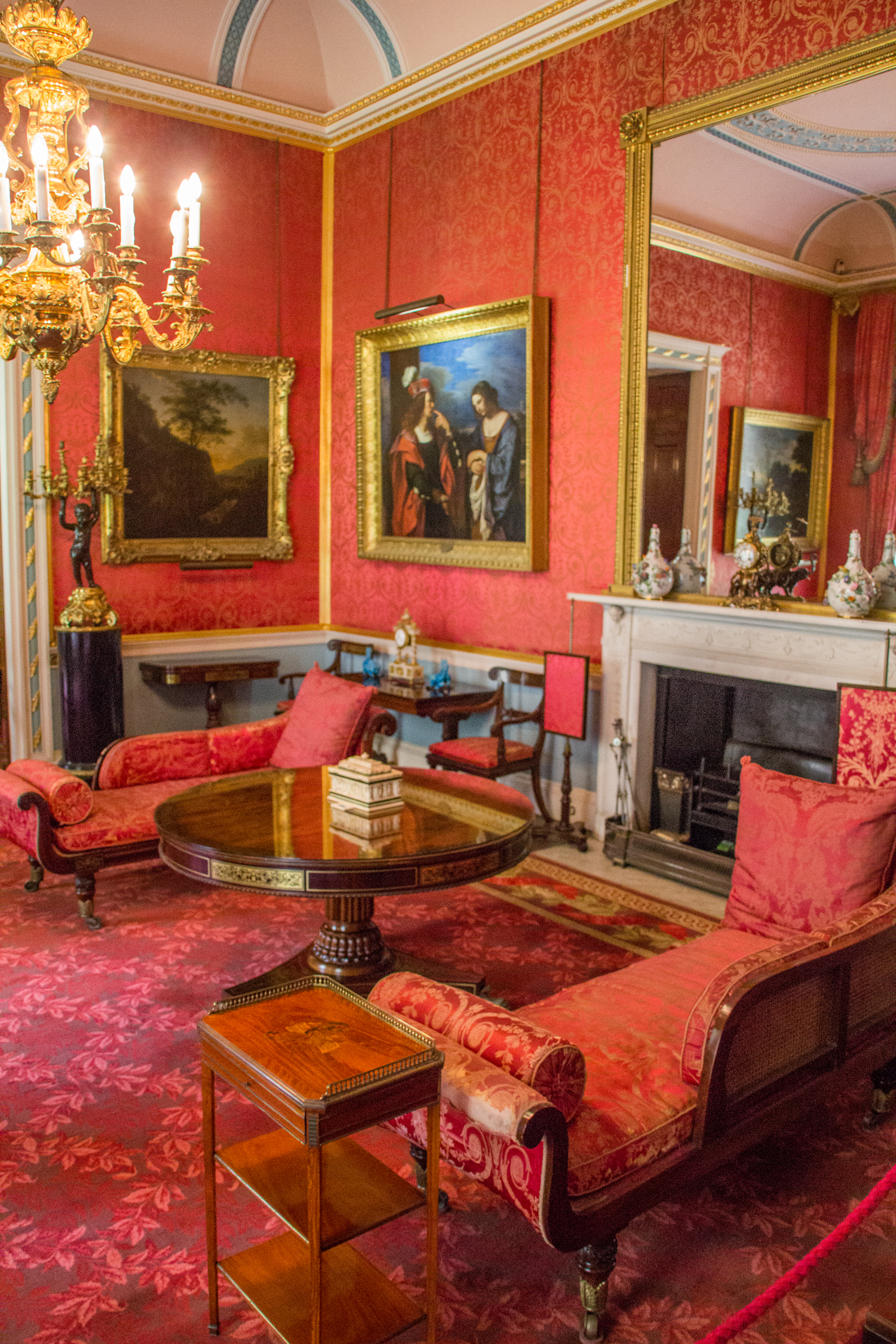
The Music Room

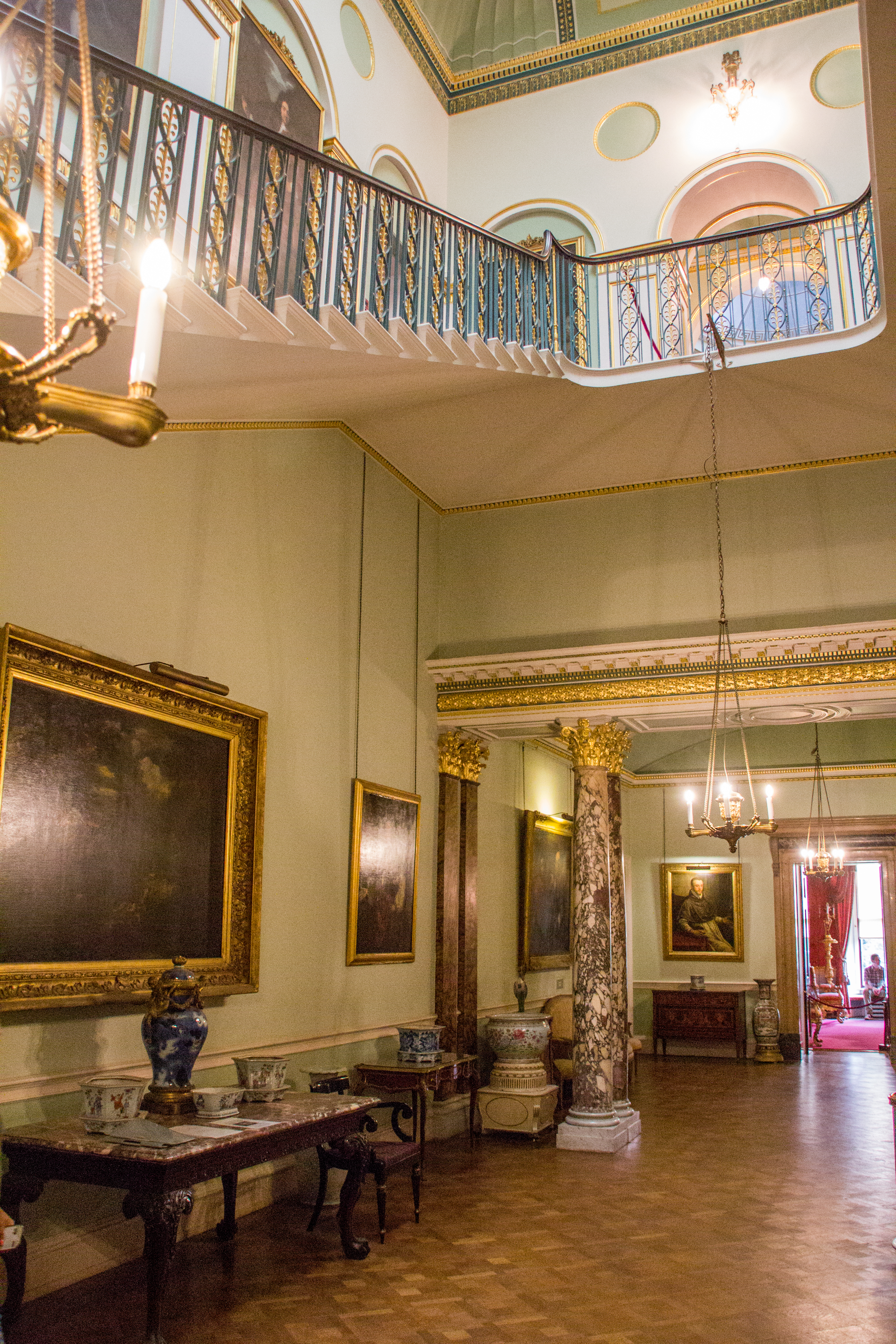
The Main Staircase

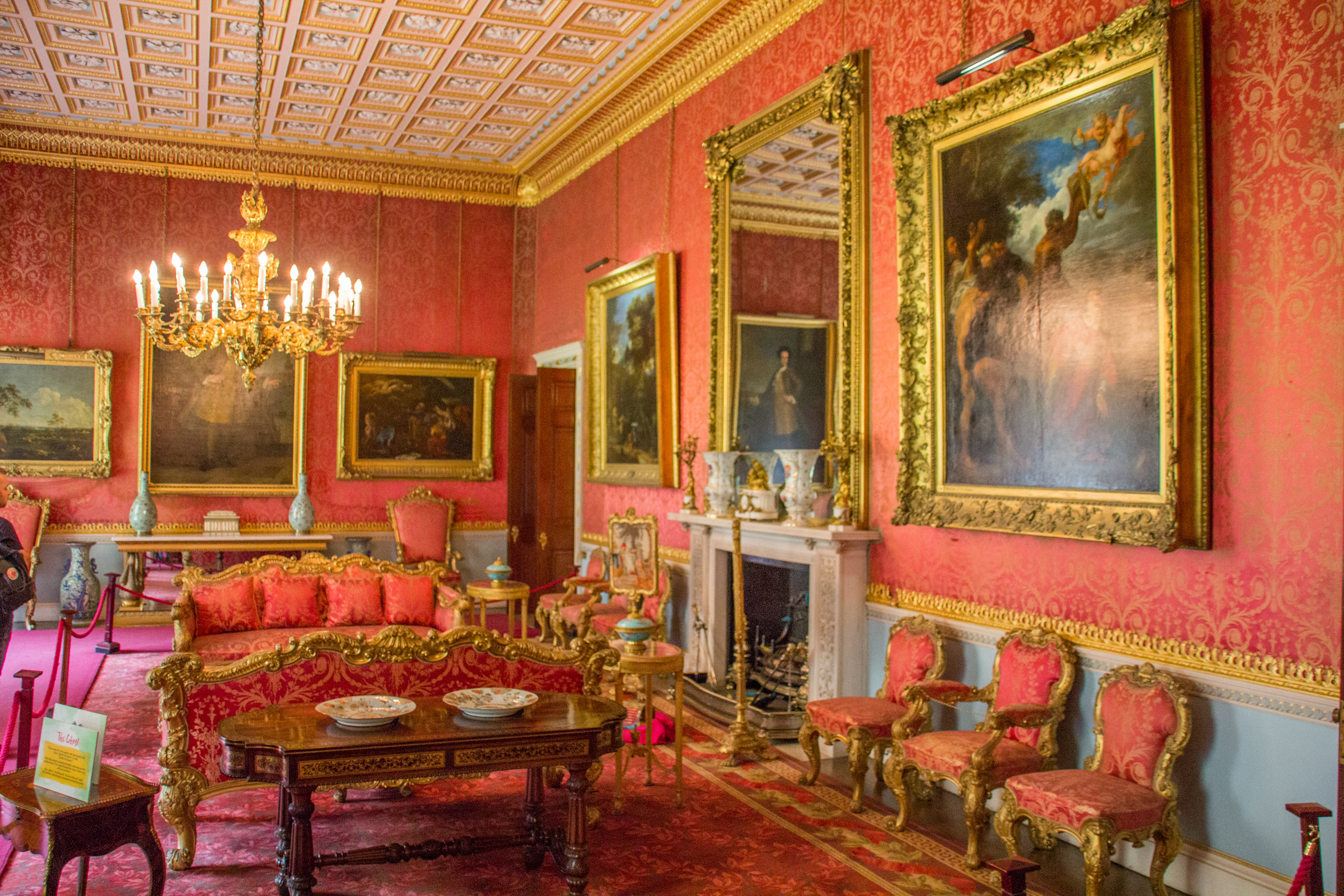
The Drawing Room

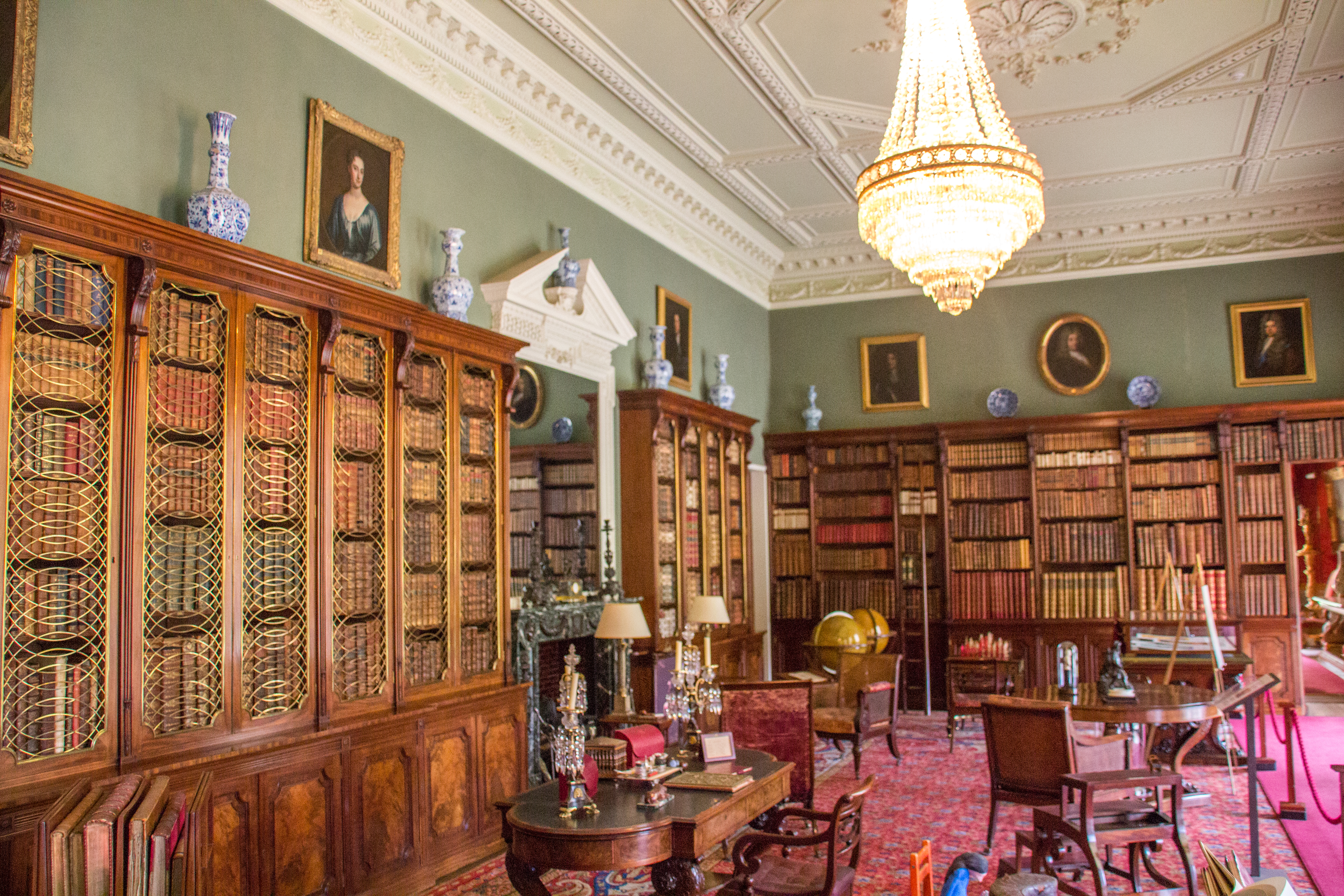
The Library

The Entrance Hall is in three bays. It is decorated in neoclassical style with a marble floor, red porphyry Ionic columns and a geometric coffered, tunnel vaulted ceiling. The furniture includes two late-17th-century Italian chests of drawers and a walnut chest dating from around 1730, and a 19th-century walnut table and chairs. On each side of a central niche are marble busts of the Duke of Wellington and William Pitt the Younger on columns. The largest painting in the entrance hall is The Cheshire Hunt, 1839 by Henry Calvert. To the west of the entrance hall is the Card Room (where calling cards were left – not for playing cards, as in other Card Rooms). This room has a neoclassical cornice and fireplace. A set of open arm chairs are English in the Adam style which date from around 1785. Other furniture dates from the 19th century in Louis XVI style marquetry. In a showcase is a rare silver filigree Horn Book. Paintings in the room include La Gouvernante by Jean-Baptiste-Siméon Chardin, The Head of an Old Man, 1639 by Abraham Bloemaert, A Farrier's by Philips Wouwerman, and Head of Nicodemus after Rogier van der Weyden.

On the other side of the Entrance Hall is the Music Room whose walls are decorated with cherry-coloured silk damask. Much of the furniture is in the French Boulle revival style (with brass inlays in the style of André Charles Boulle). An alcove was intended to be occupied by an organ but it contains a rosewood bookcase in boulle work. The circular table, couches and chairs are also in boulle style, made by Gillows. The fireplace is made from white marble and is decorated with images of musical instruments and motifs. Two vases on the mantelpiece are 19th-century Meissen. The harpsichord was made by Kirckman's and is dated 1789. The paintings include pieces by Gaspard Dughet, Aernout van der Neer, Nicolaes Pieterszoon Berchem, and Guercino, and two still life paintings by Jan Davidszoon de Heem and Cornelis de Heem. To the south of the music room is the Drawing Room which is decorated in a similar style. The ceiling is gilded and coffered and is decorated with rosettes. Together with its elaborate furniture it is the "most impressive and ostentatious room in the house". The paintings include two views of Venice by Canaletto, The Sacrifice of Noah by Nicolas Poussin, The Martyrdom of St. Stephen by Anthony van Dyck, and paintings by Annibale Carracci and Giovanni Battista Cimaroli. A full-length portrait of Samuel Egerton is by Bartolomeo Nazari.

Behind the portico on the south front of the house is the Library. The furniture in this room is practical rather than decorative, most of it again having been made by Gillows. The bookcases date from 1811 to 1812. The pair of globes, terrestrial and celestial, were made by the Cary family. On top of the bookcases are Dutch Delft vases and jars from the 17th–18th centuries. The room contains over 8,000 books, many in their original covers and in mint condition. The earliest book is dated 1513. Some of the books are unbound and in their original paper covers, including first editions of two novels by Jane Austen. Other than a portrait of Charles II, all the paintings in the library are portraits of members of the Egerton family. To the west of the Library is the Dining Room. This is a survival from the original house and is decorated in rococo style designed by Thomas Farnolls Pritchard. The white marble fireplace dates from 1840 and was designed by Richard Westmacott. Most of the furniture in the room is made in mahogany by Gillows. The paintings in the room are all portraits of the Egerton family.

In the centre of the building are the main stairs. These rise from the Staircase Hall which is lit by a domed oval skylight. To east of this hall, through two pairs of marble columns, is the Cupola Hall. On its floor is an Axminster carpet with an unusual design showing celestial objects and the signs of the Zodiac for the winter months. The halls contain English furniture in Adam style and items of oriental ceramics.

==== Upper floor ====
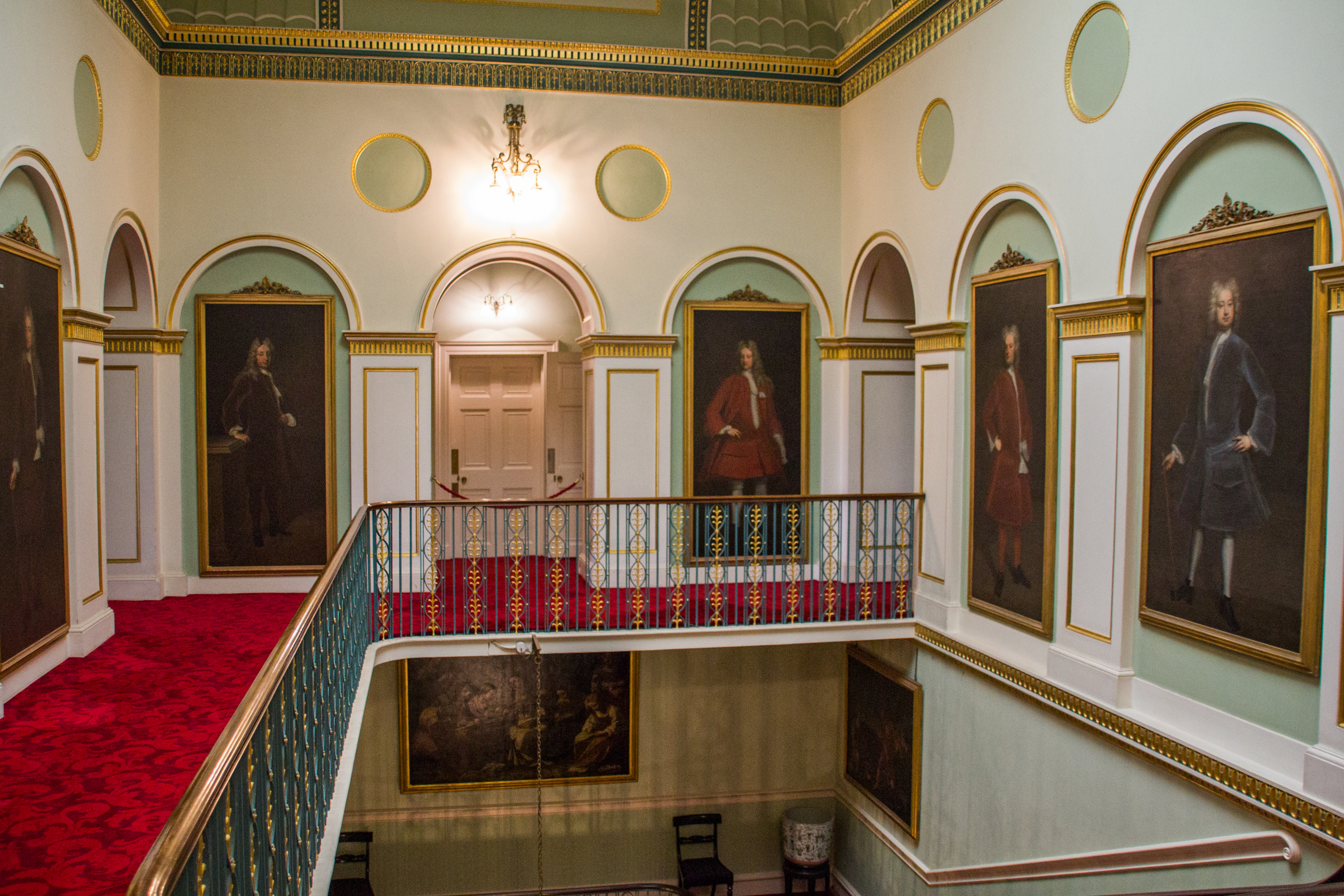
The walls of the Upper Landing

On the walls of the upper landing are ten full-length portraits known as The Cheshire Gentlemen. They portray ten of the leading gentlemen of the county who met together at Ashley Hall to decide whether to support George I or James Stuart in the Jacobite rising of 1715. They decided to support the King, which probably saved their lives and their estates.

The bedrooms are named mainly after the type or colour of the original drapery. All the bedrooms, except the Lemon Room, have adjoining dressing rooms. The furniture in all the rooms was supplied by Gillows. The Silk Bedroom is above the Entrance Hall and was one of the principal guest rooms. It contains furniture of mahogany inlaid with ebony. The bed is a cut-down four poster bed. The Silk Dressing Room contains a large tin bath on castors. The other bedrooms are the Chintz Bedroom, which is furnished as a sitting room, the Lemon Bedroom, and the Amber Bedroom, which is furnished as a Victorian day nursery. Most of the paintings in the bedrooms depict family members. The Egerton Room was originally the Blue Bedroom but, with its dressing room, is now used for an exhibition about the Egerton family. In addition to family portraits, the paintings in these rooms include schemes for the design of the house by the architects, and paintings of architectural features by J. C. Buckler. There are also three paintings of excavations for the Manchester Ship Canal by Benjamin Williams Leader. Wilbraham Egerton, 1st Earl Egerton was the second chairman of the Manchester Ship Canal Company from 1887 to 1894. The dressing room includes paintings by Giorgio Vasari and Michele Tosini.

=== Family wing ===
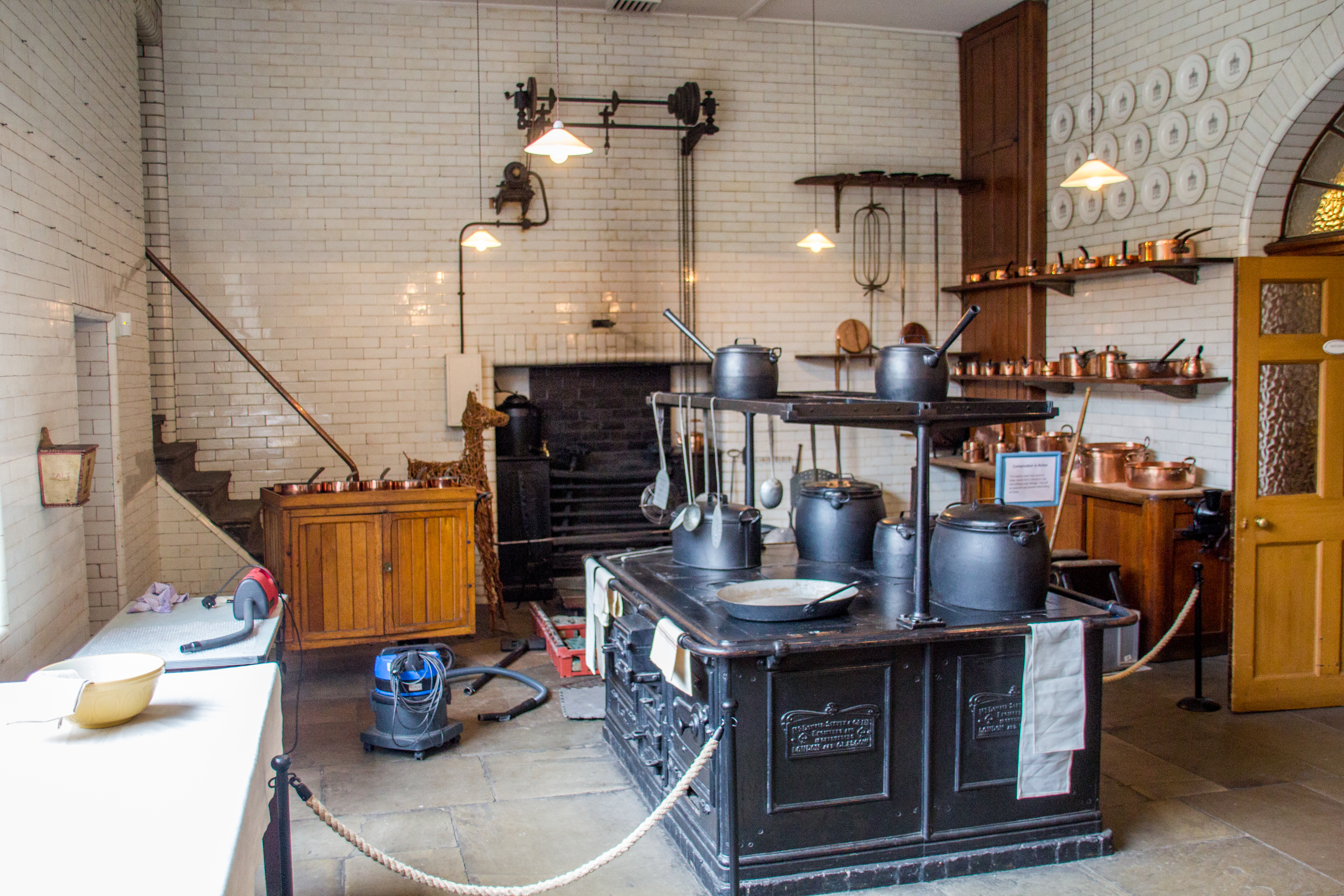
The Kitchen

Entering the family wing from the hall, the first room on the left, beyond the garden entrance, is the Yellow Drawing Room. This has a more intimate atmosphere and contains a collection of satinwood furniture made by Gillows. This includes a bookcase dated 1795 and a pair of cabinets on each side of the fireplace. The paintings are family portraits. Opposite this room is the Family Entrance and opposite the garden entrance is the Oak Staircase which was moved here from Hough End Hall. The Servants' Quarters occupy two floors, the ground floor and basement. These contain the usual rooms required to service a mansion and many of these are furnished with the equipment and utensils formerly in use in the house. One room, known as the Maurice Egerton Exhibition Room, houses a collection of items from around the world which were collected by Maurice Egerton on his travels.

=== Cellar and kitchen ===
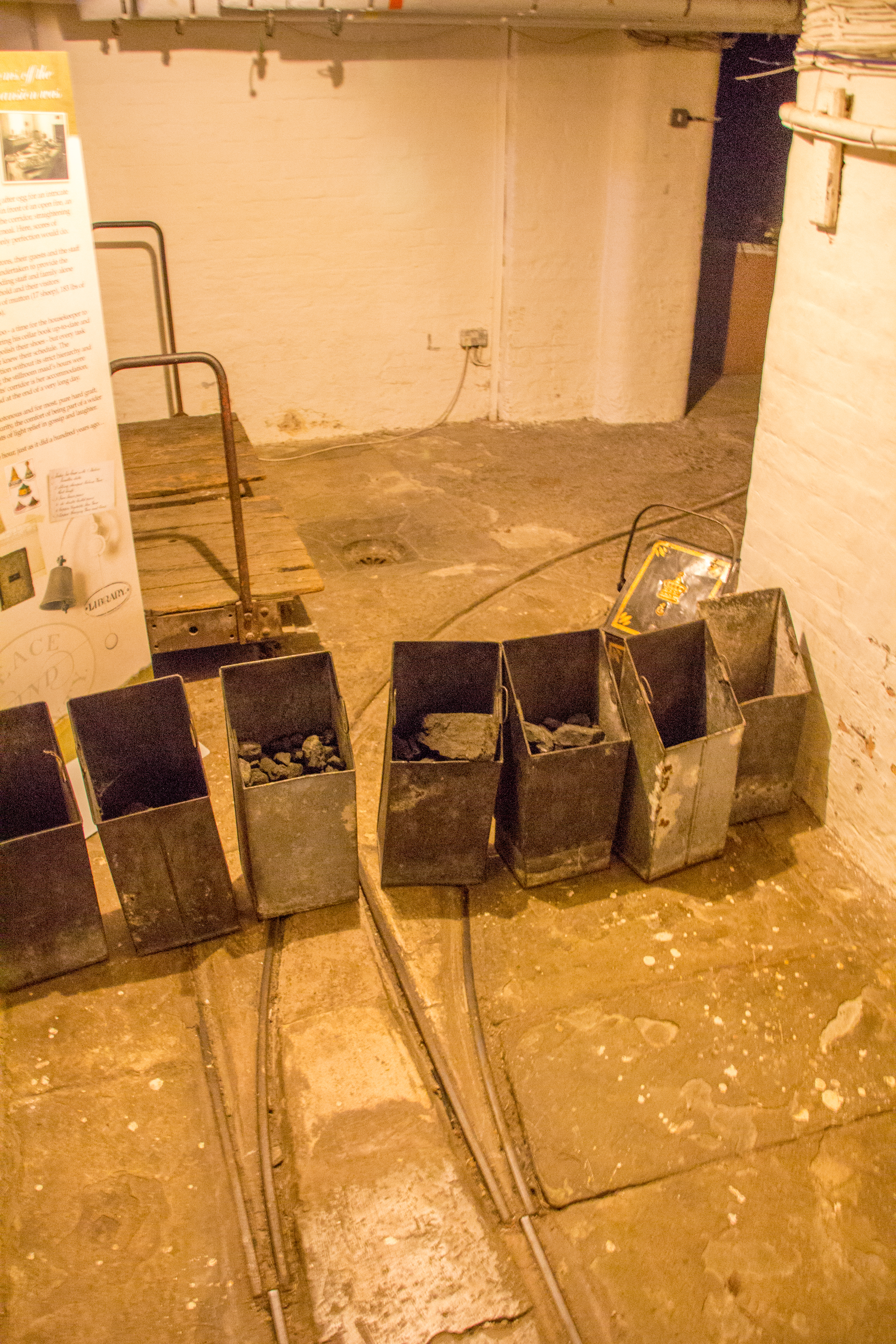
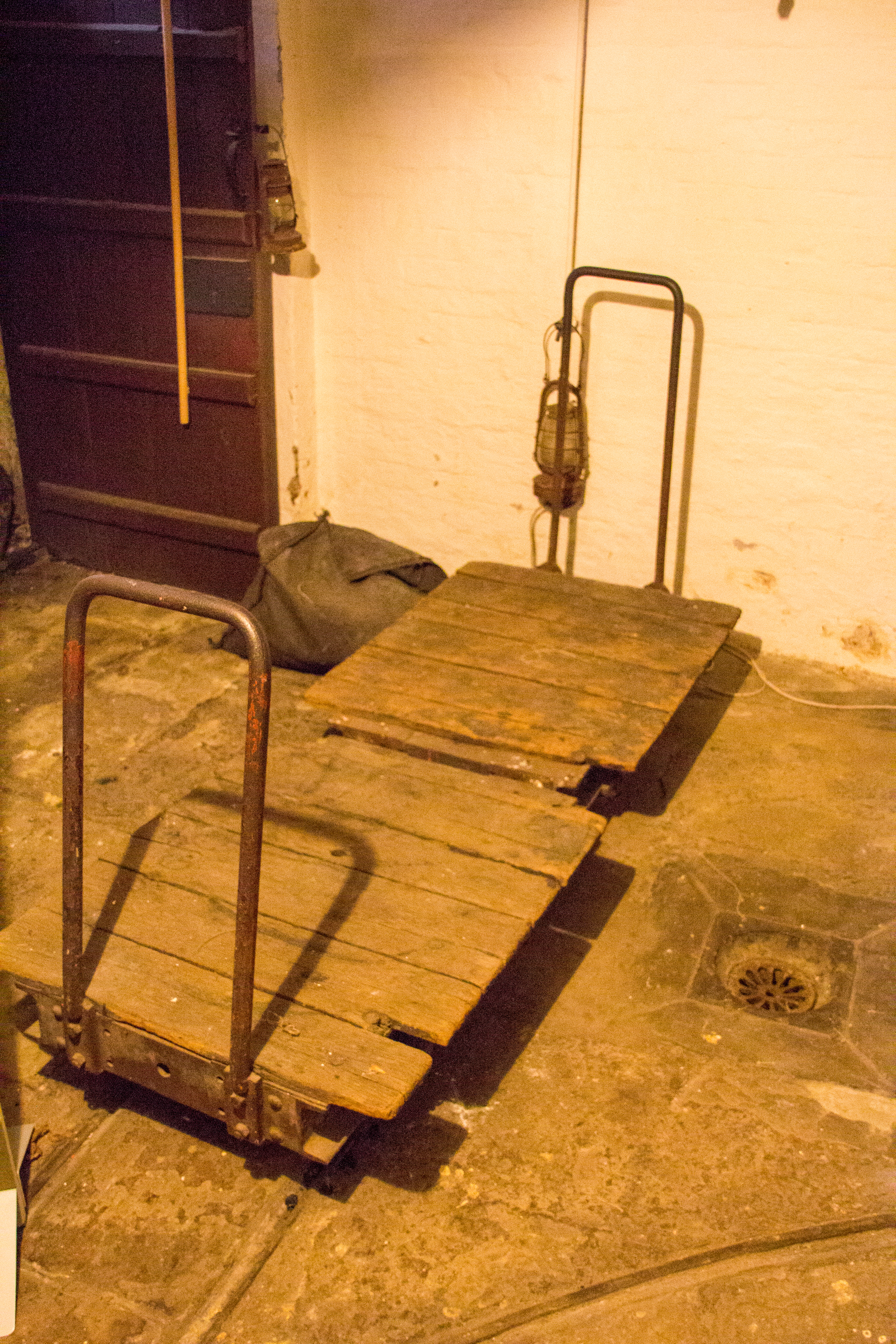
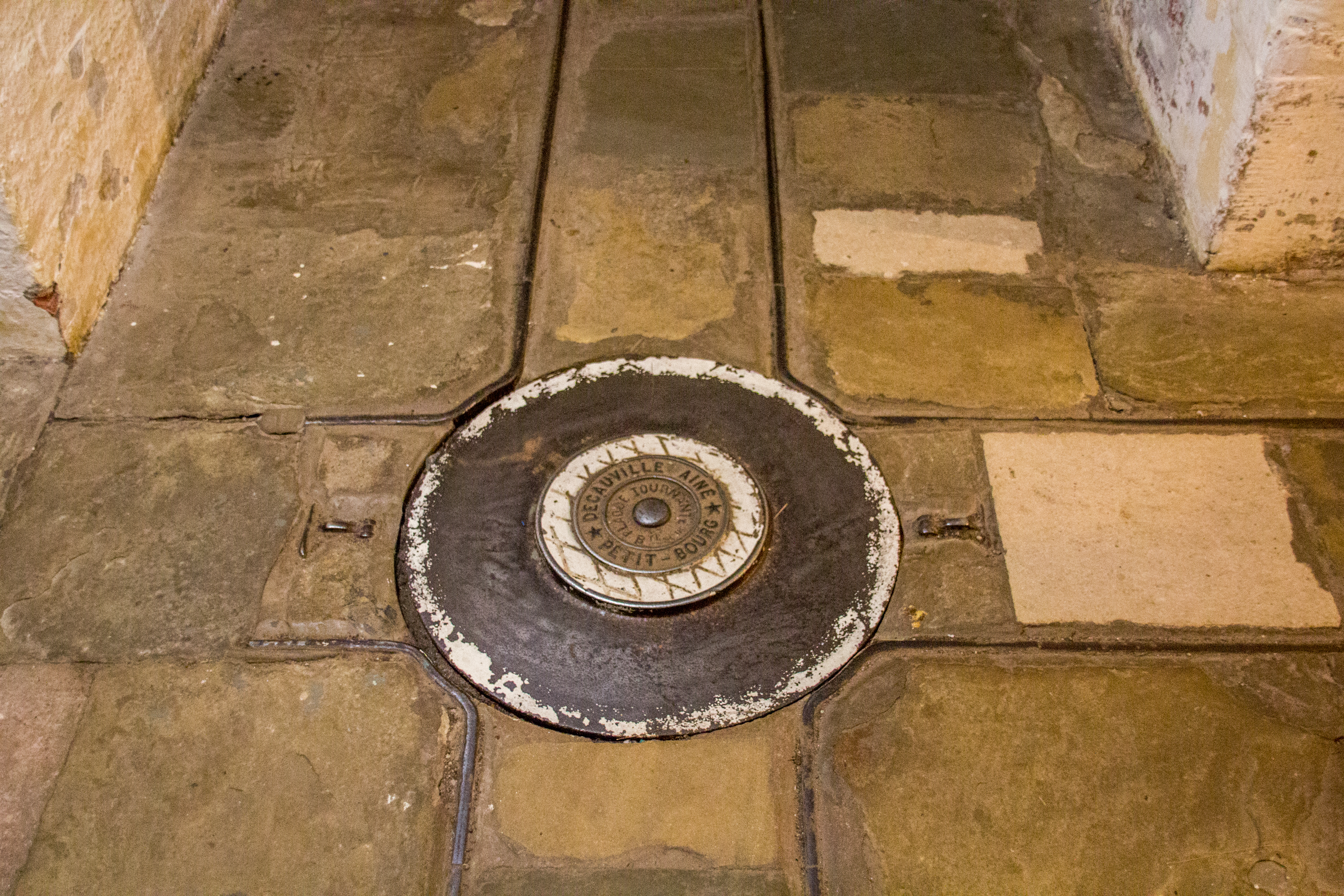
Decauville railway in the cellar of Tatton Hall

Alan de Tatton, a trained engineer, inherited Tatton in 1909, and applied his skills to improving the house. Tatton Hall was one of the first to be electrified and the kitchen range used a coal-fired boiler beneath instead of an open flame in the kitchen. The house also had the first indoor domestic refrigerator.

In the basement of is a 400 mm gauge coal railway supplied by Decauville. It was used to transport coal to the boilers of the heating system. The railway may date from the time of the 1884 conversion, when an entrance hall was added to the north side and a smoking room to the west side.

== Present day ==
Tatton Hall was designated as a Grade I listed building on 5 March 1959. The hall is financed on behalf of the National Trust by Cheshire East Council. The house is open to the public at advertised times.

== See also ==
- Grade I listed buildings in Cheshire
- Listed buildings in Tatton, Cheshire
