= Samuel Wyatt =

English architect and engineer

Samuel Wyatt (8 September 1737 – 8 February 1807) was an English architect and engineer. A member of the Wyatt family, which included several notable 18th- and 19th-century English architects, his work was primarily in a neoclassical style.

== Career ==
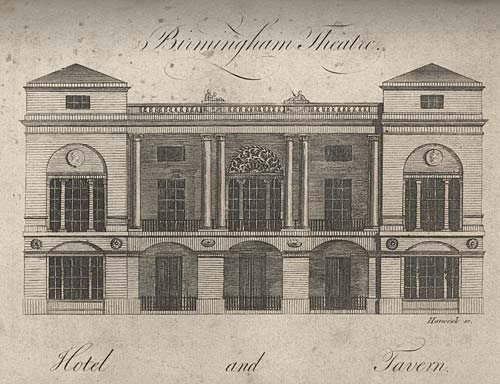
The Theatre Royal, Birmingham in 1780

In his twenties, Wyatt was master carpenter and later Robert Adam's clerk of works at Kedleston Hall in Derbyshire, which was a landmark in English neoclassical architecture. He later worked with his brother James Wyatt on the Pantheon in Oxford Street, London. He designed neoclassical country houses such as Tatton Park in Cheshire, and Trinity House in London and Digswell House in Hertfordshire.

Wyatt's career was diverse. He designed the Albion Mills in London, which was the first in the world to be powered by steam engines, and patented designs for cast iron bridges. He designed model farm buildings, cottages, and several lighthouses, including those at Dungeness, Longships and Flamborough Head.

Between 1784 and 1807 Samuel worked as architect to the Holkham Hall estate, he designed several farms, 'The Great Barn' as well as the new kitchen garden with its hothouses, including 'The Vinery'. He used a simplified new-classical style for these buildings.

In 1791 Samuel was hired by Rev Edward Hughes to design and build an early version of Kinmel Hall in Abergele, Wales, which he completed in 1802 and which is referred to as the Wyatt Kinmel.

Samuel Wyatt developed a friendship with Matthew Boulton, for whom he designed Soho House in the Handsworth Staffordshire (now Birmingham) in 1789. Prior to this, Boulton recommended him to the proprietors of the Theatre Royal on New Street, Birmingham in 1777, and in 1780, a portico of coupled Ionic columns between arched wings was added to the front of the theatre to a design by Wyatt. It is also believed that he was recommended by Boulton to James Watt, for whom Wyatt designed Heathfield House in Handsworth. This was completed in 1790. He was also responsible for work at Moseley Hall in the Moseley area of Birmingham.

Together with Charles Tatham he also designed Dropmore House in Buckinghamshire, which was built in the 1790s for the prime minister at the time, Lord Grenville, who pushed through the law abolishing the slave trade. At the turn of the 19th century, he remodelled and extended Shugborough Hall for Viscount Anson.

In 1790 Wyatt was appointed surveyor of lighthouses to Trinity House, building head quarters for them in London and several lighthouses around the coastline, including one for Ramsgate Harbour. This was his first project for the Board of Trustees, constructed in 1794 and ahead of the build commencing, he was given the role of Engineer to the Harbour, replacing John Smeaton who died in office on 1792. The lighthouse was replaced in 1842 but prior to this was the subject of a painting by J. M. W. Turner in 1823, owned by Tate Britain.

Wyatt designed the buildings in the Pier Yard of Ramsgate Harbour including the Pier House and Harbourmasters House (now lost.) The surviving building, the Clockhouse, shows a strong resemblance to the agricultural buildings created for the Holkham Hall Estate, showing his ability to create utilitarian buildings in the fashionable neoclassical taste.

== Gallery of architectural work ==
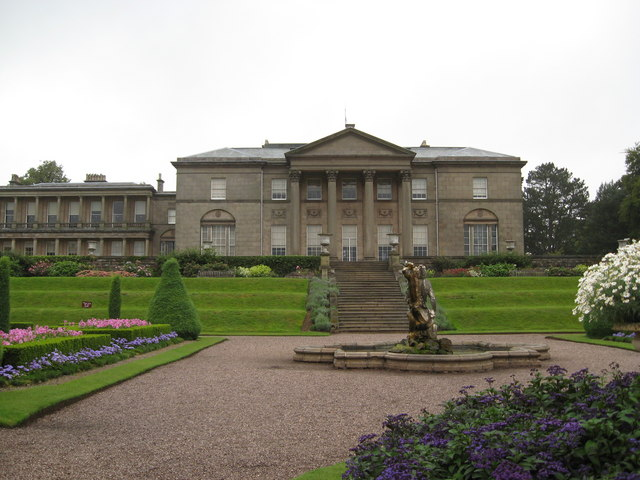
Tatton Hall, Cheshire

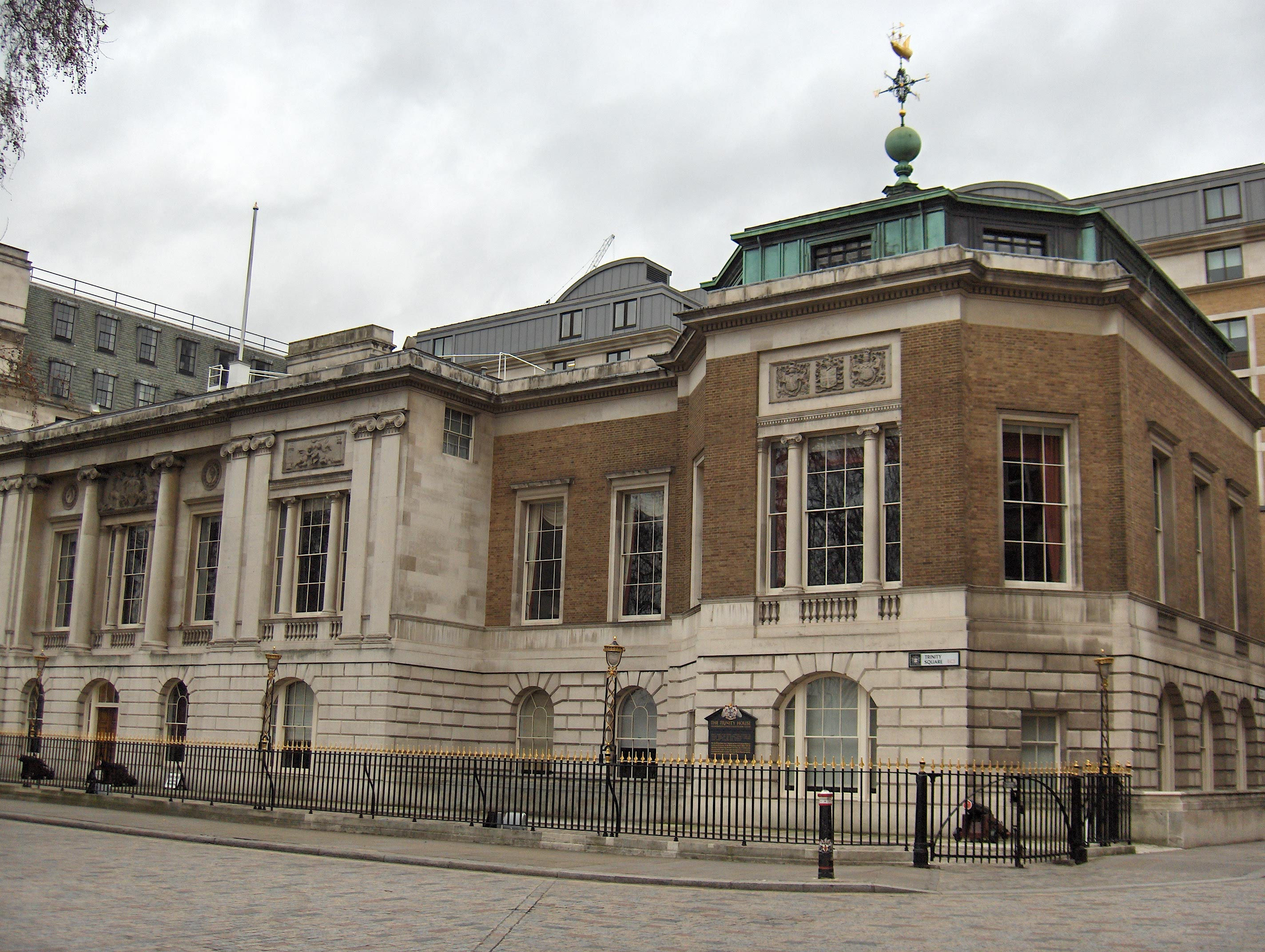
Trinity House, London (Samuel's work is in stone on the left)

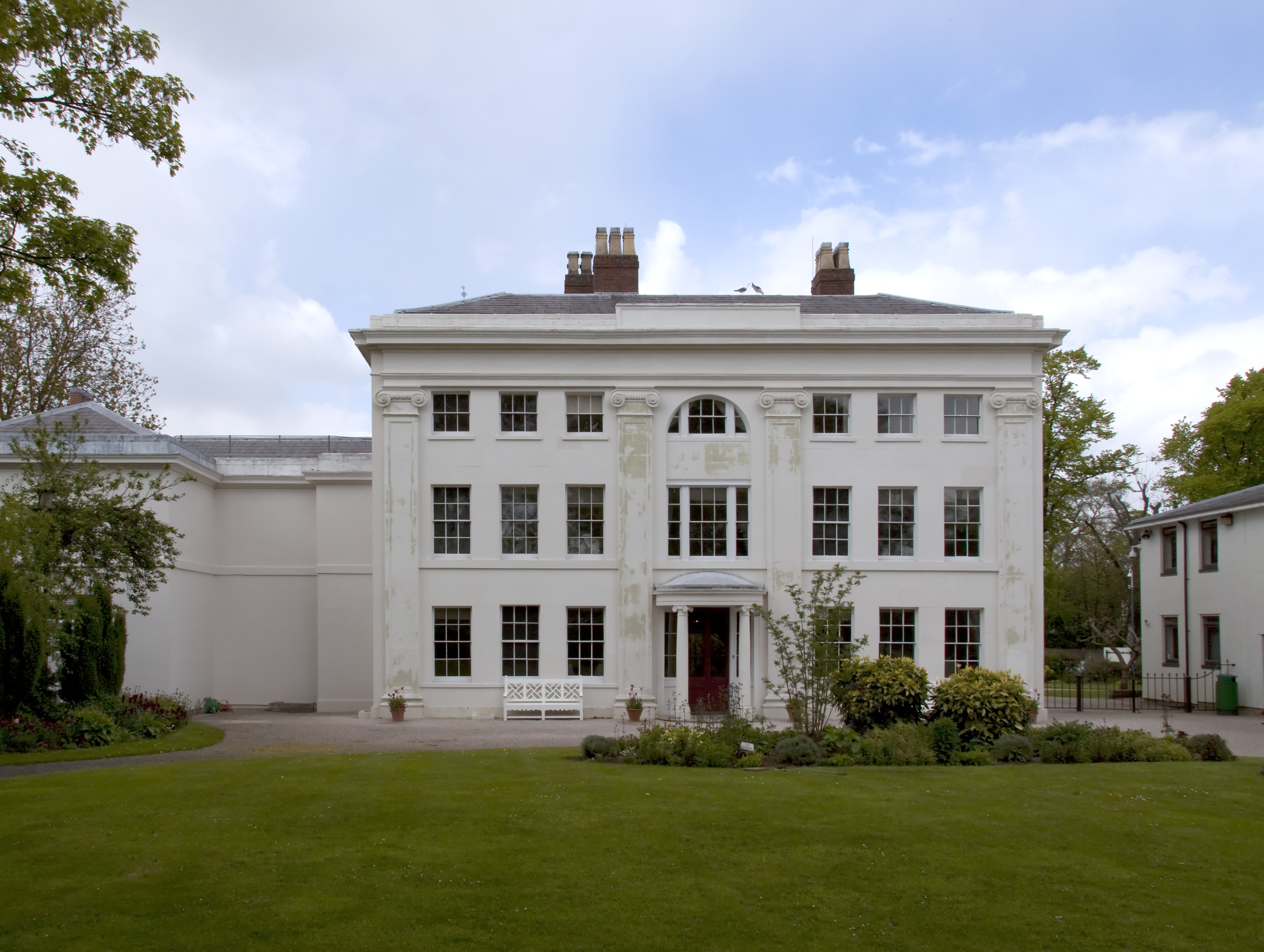
Soho House, Staffordshire

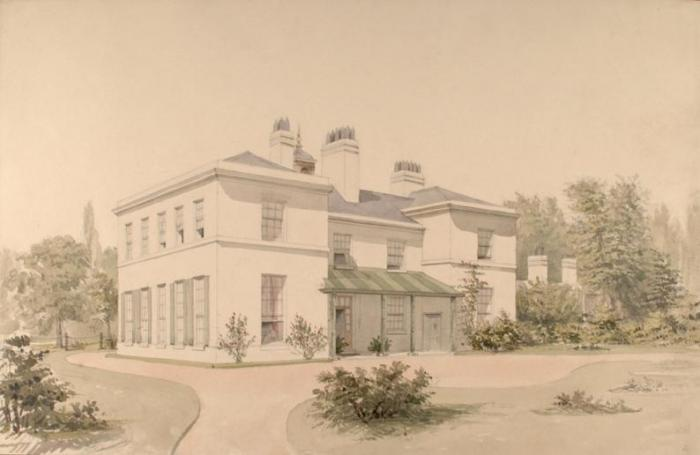
Heathfield Hall - 1835 painting by Allen Edward Everitt

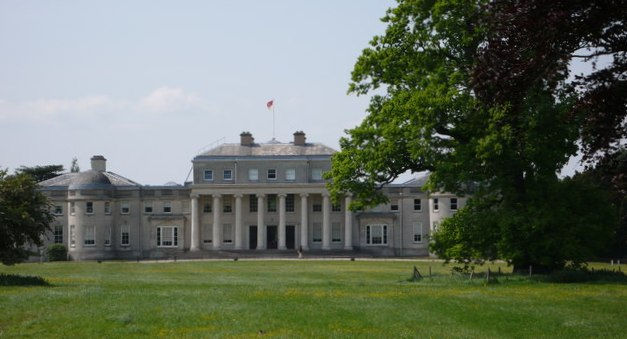
Shugborough Hall, Staffordshire

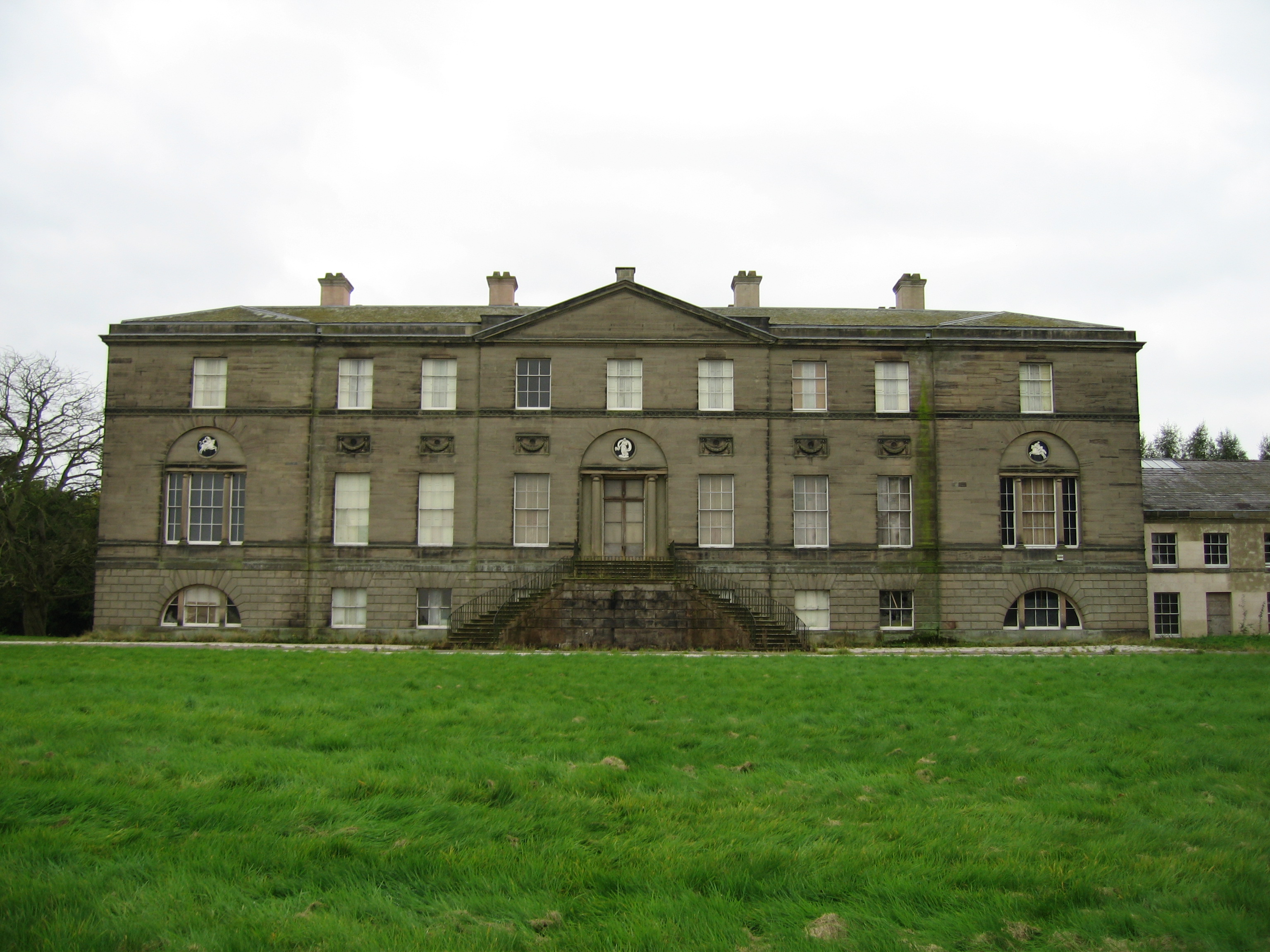
Doddington Hall, Cheshire

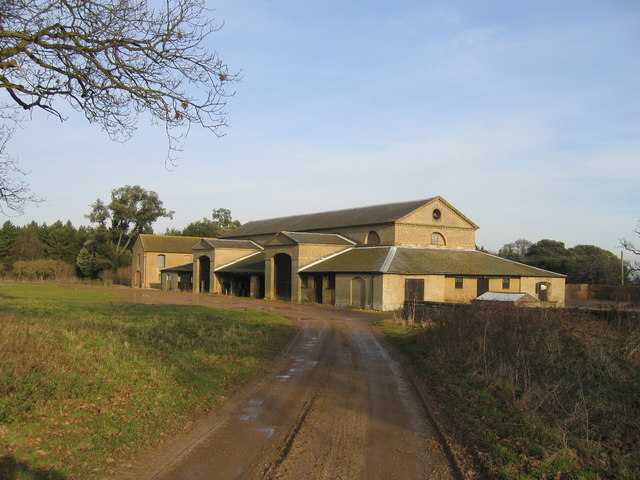
The Great Barn, Holkham estate Norfolk

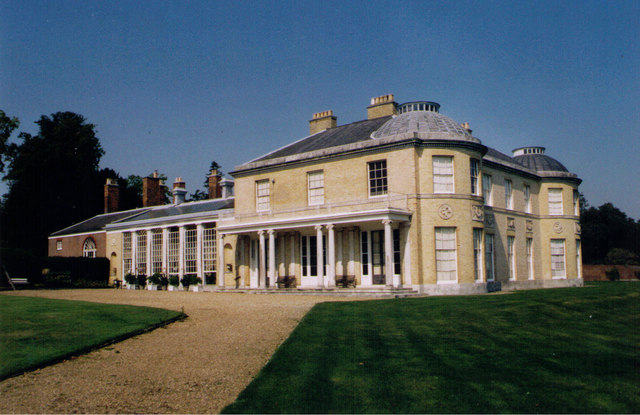
Belmont House, Throwley, Kent, built 1789–1793 for Colonel John Montresor

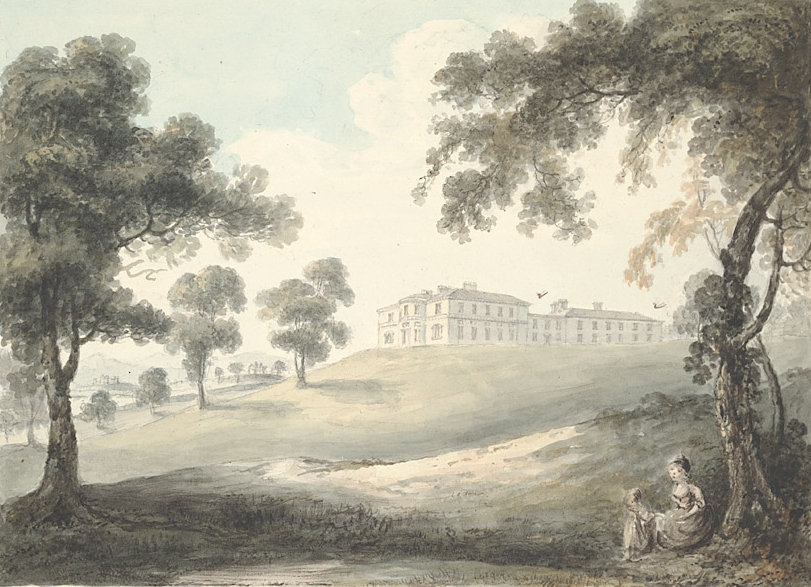
Kinmel Hall, Abergele

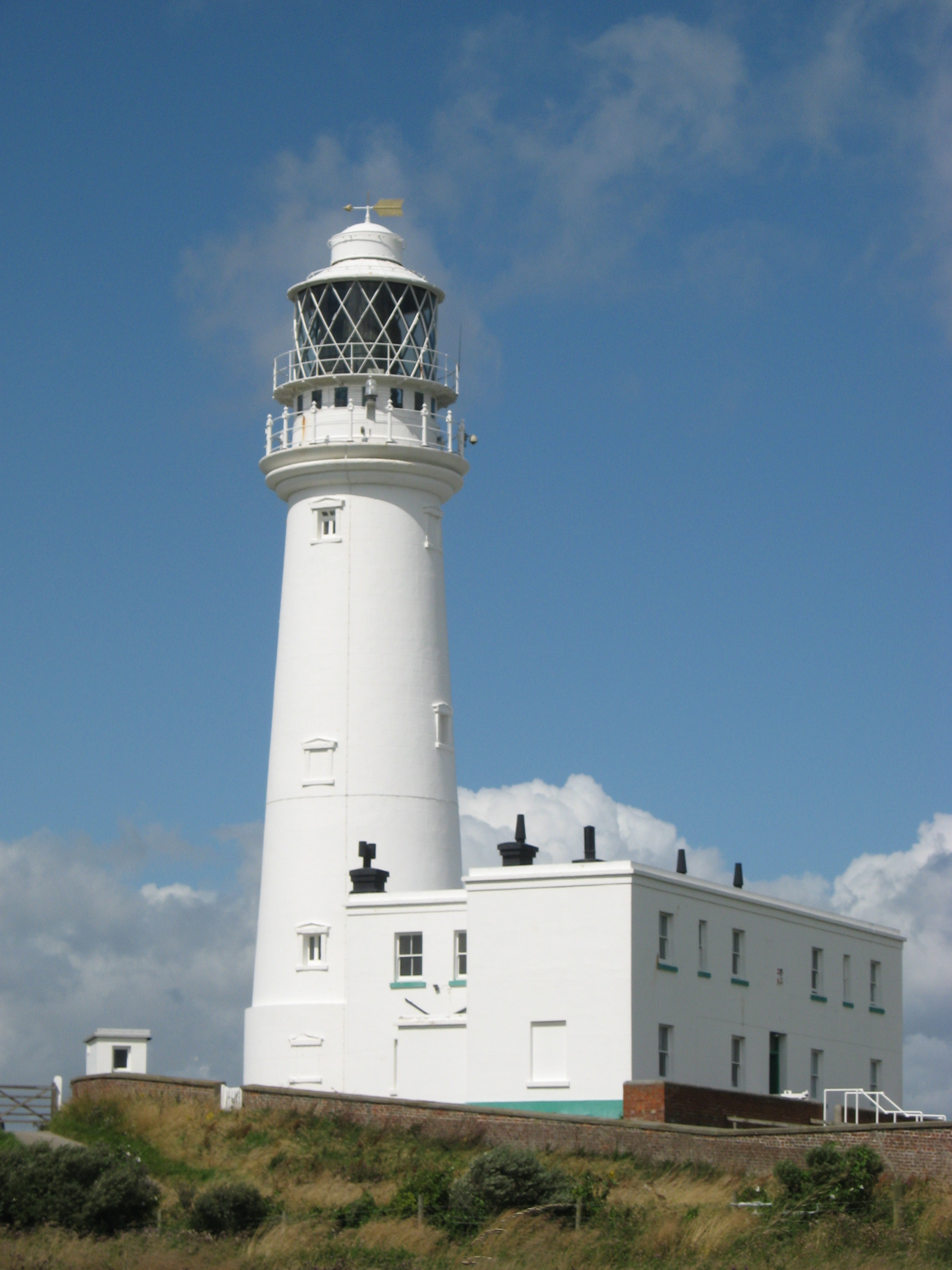
Flamborough Head Lighthouse, Yorkshire

== See also ==
- Wyatt family
