= Tatton Park =

Historic estate in Cheshire, England

Coordinates: 53.3306°N 2.38356°W

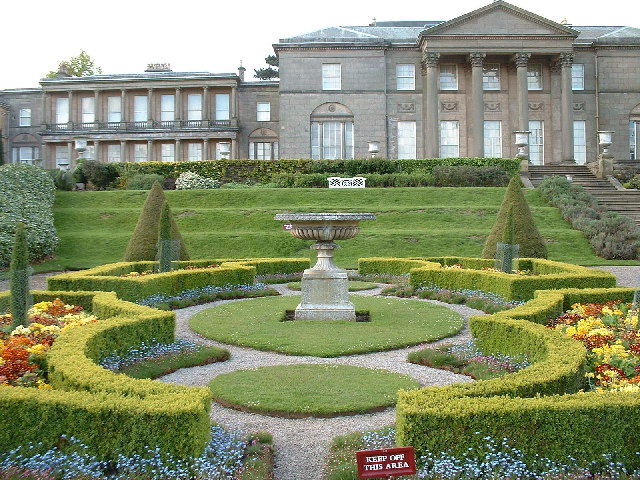
Tatton Hall and the Italian Garden

Tatton Park is a historic estate in Cheshire, England, north of the town of Knutsford. It contains a mansion, Tatton Hall; a medieval manor house, Tatton Old Hall; Tatton Park Gardens, a farm and a deer park of 2,000 acres (810 ha). It is a popular visitor attraction and hosts over a hundred events annually. The estate is owned by the National Trust and is managed under lease by Cheshire East Council. Since 1999, it has hosted North West England's annual Royal Horticultural Society flower show.

== History ==
=== Village ===
There is evidence of human habitation in the area of the estate going back to the Iron Age. The village of Tatton existed in medieval times. The settlement is now a Deserted medieval village but its buildings and roadways – which are now a scheduled monument – can still be seen as imprints within the estate's parkland.

=== Old Hall ===
By the end of the 15th century, the land on which the estate was created was owned by the Stanley family who built and occupied what became known as the Old Hall. By the 1580s this building had been enlarged and it was owned by the Brereton family. In 1598 the estate was bought by Sir Thomas Egerton, Lord Chancellor of England, from his half sister Dorothy Brereton. Sir Thomas and his children rarely visited the estate and it was rented to tenants. The hall was originally timber-framed, which was subsequently replaced by brick. It is L-shaped, in two storeys. The floors that had been inserted into the older wing have been removed, revealing the complex wooden roof. The Old Hall stands in grounds surrounded by a wall. Within these grounds is a reconstructed cruck barn. It is timber-framed with brick infill and has a thatched roof. Most of the timber has come from a demolished barn at Clotton Hoofield. The barn has been designated by English Heritage as a Grade II listed building.

=== Tatton Hall ===
At the end of the 17th century the estate was owned by John Egerton, Sir Thomas' grandson, who built a new house on the site of the present mansion, some 0.75 miles (1 km) to the west of the Old Hall. Work was completed around 1716. From 1758 improvements were made to the house and between the 1770s and 1816 most of it was replaced by the present neoclassical mansion, designed by Samuel Wyatt and his nephew Lewis William Wyatt. Further additions to the house were made in 1861–62 and in 1884. During the late 19th century large house parties were held in the hall, some of them attended by British and foreign royalty.

The mansion contains much of the furniture made for its occupants by the family firm Gillows of Lancaster. There are over 150 provenanced or marked Gillow examples. Also in the hall is a large collection of paintings, many of them being portraits of the Egerton family, and in addition paintings by Canaletto, Poussin, Chardin, Van Dyck, Vasari, and many others. The Library contains first editions of two novels by Jane Austen. One room is dedicated to a collection of items from around the world assembled by the last owner of the house, Maurice Egerton, the last Lord Egerton. In the family wing are the servants' quarters. These include rooms containing much of the equipment and many of the utensils used to serve the family. The hall is a member of the Historic Houses Association.

This mansion, Tatton Hall, was extensively altered and extended between 1780 and 1813. In 1795 the estate covered 251,000 acres (1,020 km^{2}) (392 sq.miles).

=== Agriculture ===
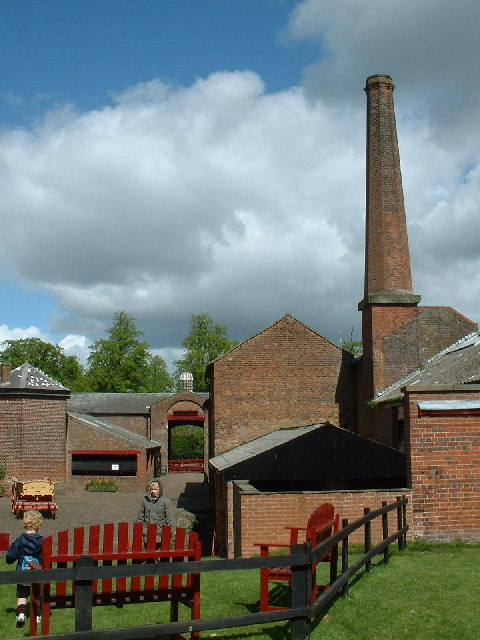
Home Farm

To the north of the mansion is Home Farm, which provided food and building services for the estate. It has been maintained to look much as it did in the 1930s when electricity replaced steam to operate the farm machinery. It is now open as a visitor attraction and contains a variety of farm animals. The farm takes an interest in caring for and breeding rare breeds of farm animals, including Tamworth pigs, Red Poll cows and Leicester Longwool sheep. In 2007 the farm received accreditation by the Rare Breeds Survival Trust.

=== Second World War ===
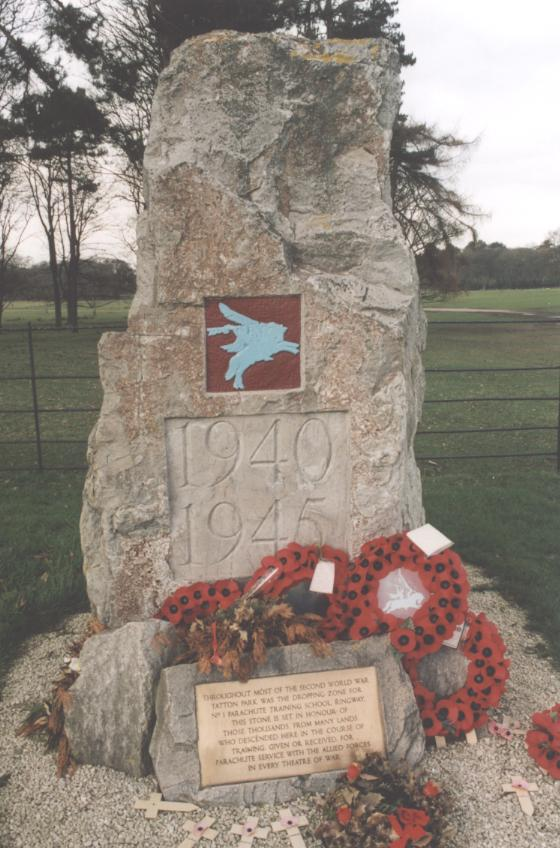
Memorial to No. 1 Parachute Training School 1940–1945 at Tatton Park

During World War II Lord Egerton's parkland played a major role in the training of all allied paratroops by No.1 Parachute Training School RAF based at nearby RAF Ringway. On 6 July 1940, Squadron Leader Louis Strange approached his pre-World War I fellow aviator and friend Maurice Egerton to ask for his co-operation in granting permission for the Royal Air Force to use his estate for this most important wartime purpose. Lord Egerton readily agreed to the proposal and the first live test jumps from aircraft were made on 13 July by RAF parachuting instructors.

Between 1940 and early 1946, approximately 60,000 trainees from the United Kingdom and several European countries, including Special agents made their first training drops from cages suspended from Barrage balloons over an open area to the northwest of the hall.

After their initial drops from the balloons, the trainees then boarded aircraft at Ringway for the short flight to overhead Tatton Park, where they jumped in batches of ten, and later twenty, from approximately 800 feet. Some trainees requested 'drops' into Tatton Mere or into the parkland's trees to further prepare them for active operations.

A free-standing stone memorial to Tatton Park's major wartime role in parachute training is located at the far edge of the dropping zone, about 0.6 miles (970 m) to the NW of the hall.

=== Preservation ===
The estate remained in the ownership of the Egerton family until the last Lord Egerton died without issue in 1958. In his will, Lord Egerton left the house to the National Trust and gave them the park in lieu of death duties. However, as the estate itself was sold by his executors, Cheshire County Council committed to a 99-year lease in place of an endowment to ensure that it was preserved for the benefit of the nation. The Trust's ownership (run now by Cheshire East Council) is some 2,000 acres (810 ha) (3.1 sq.miles). The Hall and Park have been developed into a visitor attraction on an increasingly commercial basis.

== Features ==
=== Gardens ===
The gardens lie to the south of the hall and consist of formal and more natural gardens. Immediately to the southeast of the hall is the Italian Garden, a formal garden on two terraces, containing a statue of Neptune as its centrepiece. This garden was designed by Joseph Paxton and laid out by Edward Milner in 1847. After modifications over the years it was restored to its original design in 1986. The present public entrance to the gardens from the stable yard leads into the Walled Garden which contains various buildings, including glasshouses. This garden was restored in the 2000s, and grows varieties of fruit and vegetables which were grown at Tatton in the Edwardian era. To the east of the Kitchen Garden are the Conservatory (previously often known as the Orangery), the Fernery and the Showhouse.

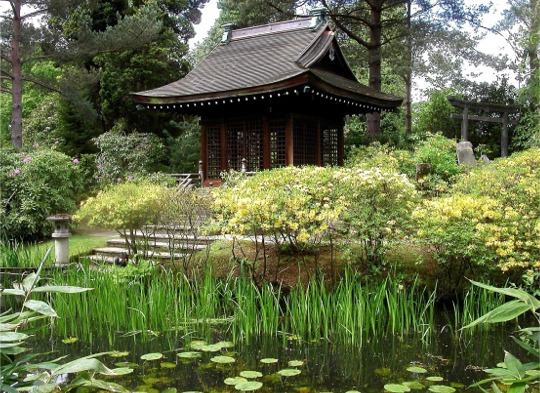
Japanese Garden showing the Shinto Shrine

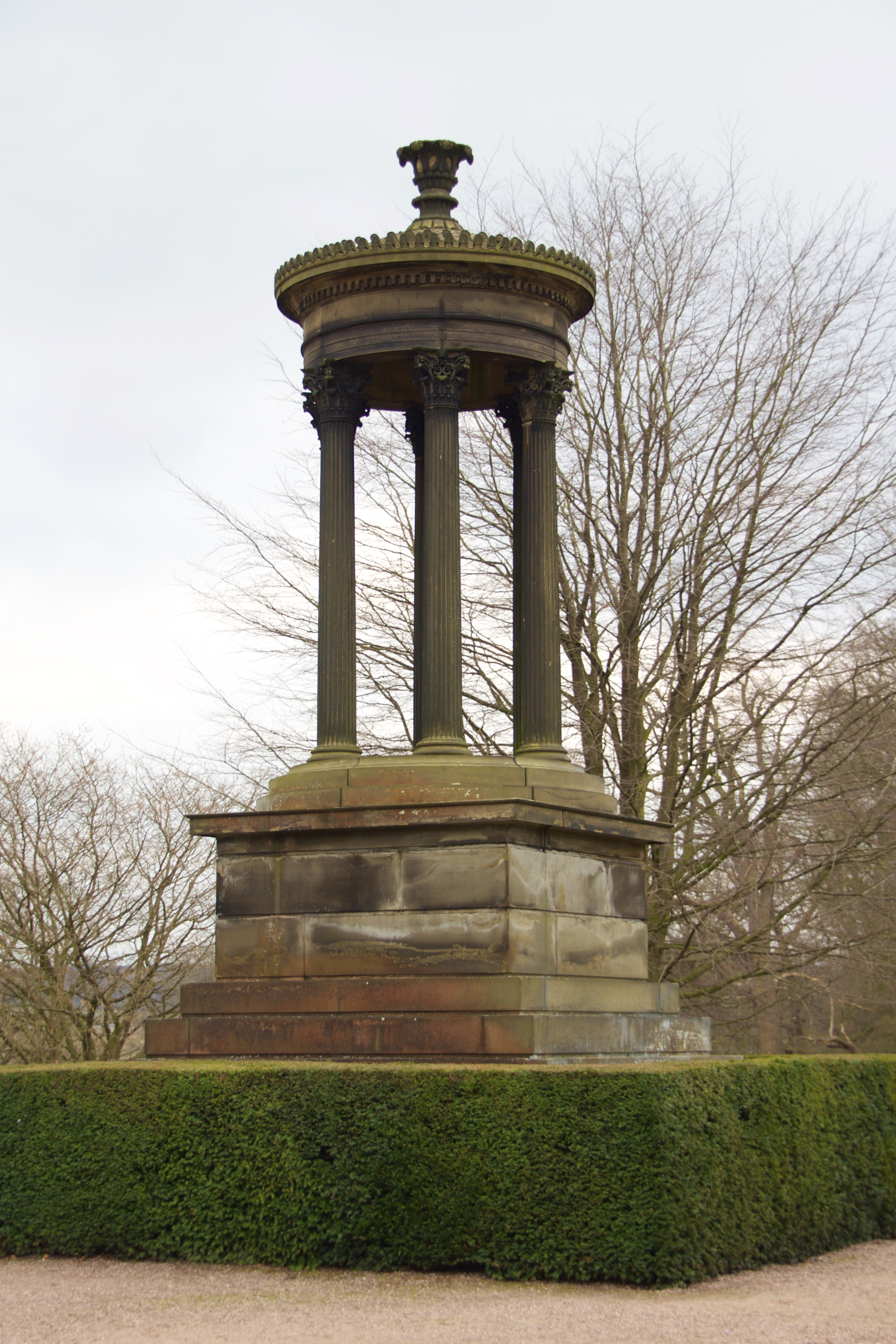
Copy of Choragic Monument of Lysicrates

Beyond the Kitchen Garden are the "Pleasure Gardens" which were used for the family's enjoyment rather than for utility. These lie on each side of the Broad Walk, which stretches towards the south, ending in the Monument, which is a copy of the Choragic Monument of Lysicrates in Athens. The gardens include Charlotte's Garden, the Topiary, the Rose Garden, the Tower Garden, the Maze and the Leech Pool. At the southwest extremity of the gardens is the Arboretum which contains 880 plants of 281 species. Between the Arboretum and the south end of the Broad Walk lies the Japanese Garden which was constructed in the 1910s. This contains structures such as a Shinto shrine, a tea house and a bridge over the Golden Brook. The plants, rocks and stones in the garden are arranged to give a natural balance and a mound has been built to resemble Mount Fuji. The garden had become overgrown and it was restored to its former state in the early 2000s.

=== Parkland ===
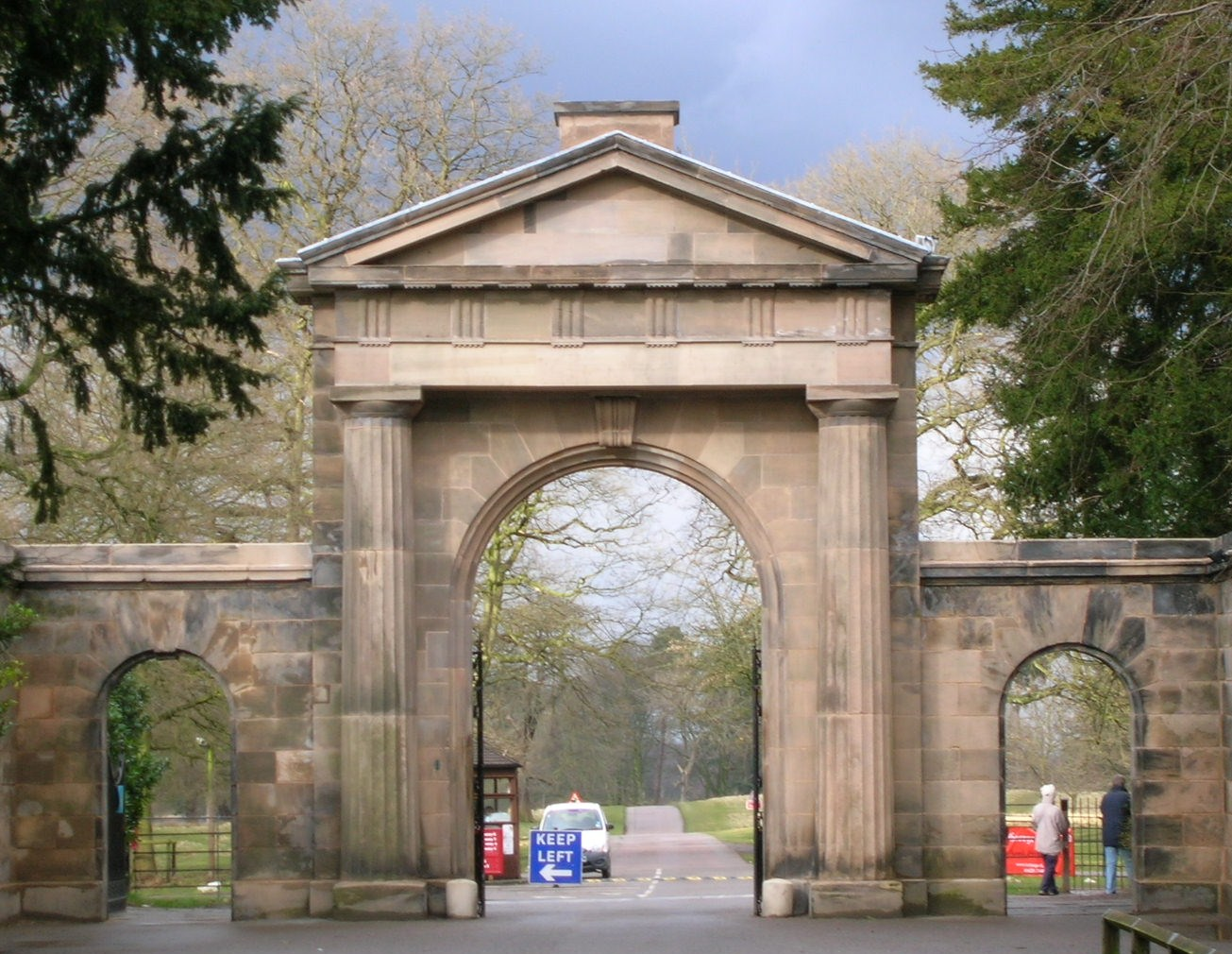
The Knutsford Lodge

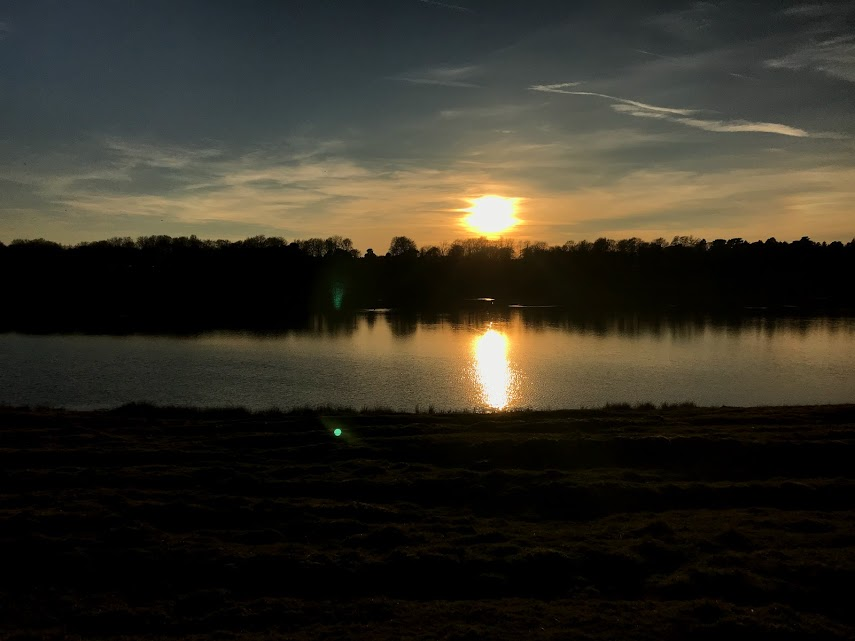
A winter sunset at Tatton Park

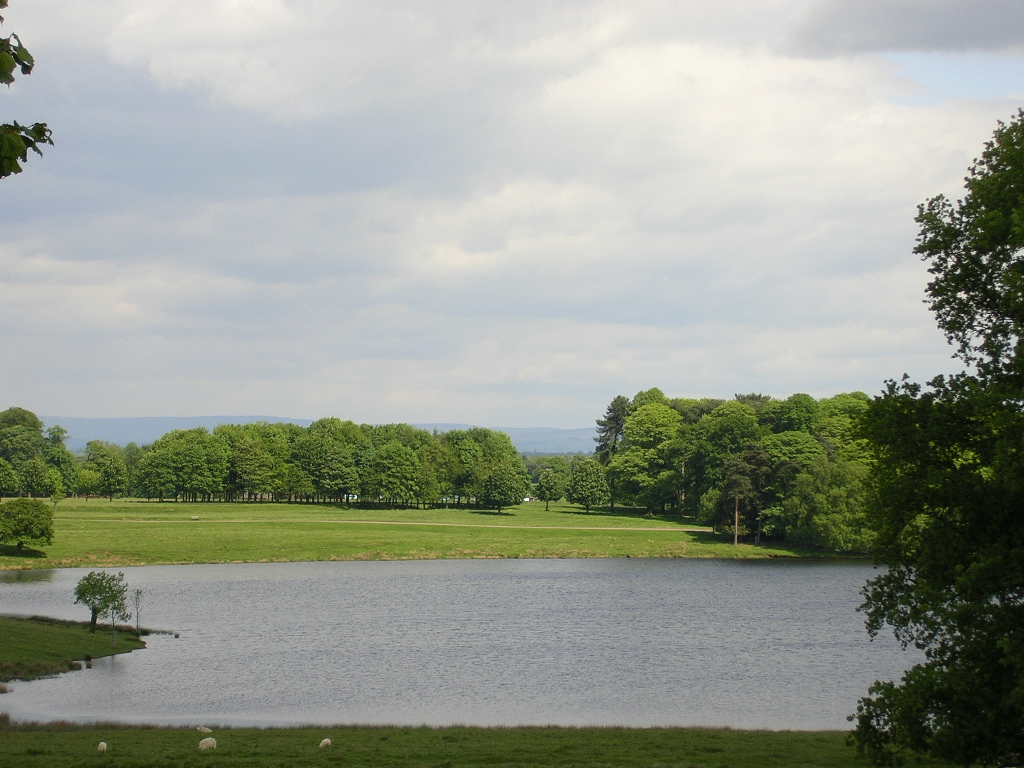
Tatton Mere

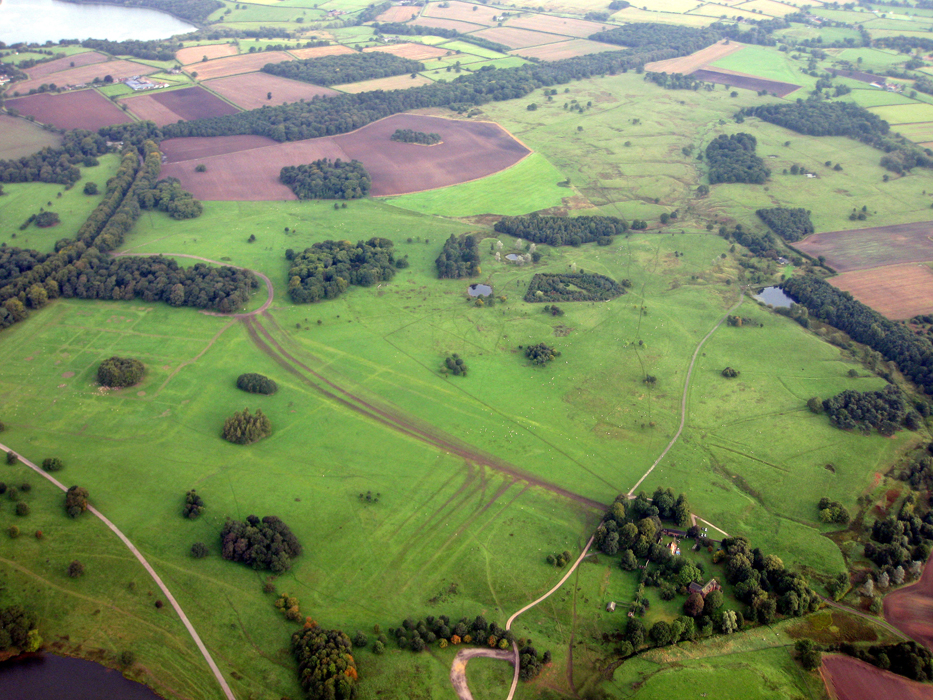
Tatton Park looking northwest with the wartime parachutist landing area in the centre of the image

The parkland consists of 2,000 acres (810 ha)} of landscaped deer park, 1,000 acres (4.0 km^{2}) of which are open to the public. Much of the design of the park was inspired by the ideas of Humphrey Repton. In the park are two meres; the larger, Tatton Mere, is natural but the other, Melchett Mere, is the consequence of subsidence in the 1920s. The meres are Sites of Special Scientific Interest and Ramsar sites.

The deer park was created by a royal charter in 1290 and deer have been present since then. The two species present are red deer and fallow deer of which there are 400 breeding stock. Two rare species of sheep graze in the park, Hebridean sheep and Soay sheep. Visitor activities pursued in the park include walking, cycling (cycles are available to hire), horse riding, sailing and fishing. Near the main car park is a children's adventure playground. The parkland is listed as Grade II* in the Register of Parks and Gardens of Special Historic Interest in England.

Around the park are three lodges. To the south leading to Knutsford is Knutsford Lodge. This dates from 1810 and was designed by Lewis Wyatt. It consists of a triple gateway constructed of ashlar stone with a large central arch and smaller flanking arches, each with cast-iron gates, and a single-storey lodge to the west. The lodge is also constructed of ashlar with a slate roof. Flanking the central arch are Doric columns carrying an entablature with a triglyph frieze, and a pediment surmounted by heavy acroteria. The archway is semicircular with voussoirs and a scrolled keystone. The outer arches are simple.

Rostherne Lodge to the west has a hexastyle Greek Doric portico. Above this is a full entablature with triglyphs and guttae below. The pediment is plain. The lodge was designed in 1833 by James Hakewill.

=== Listed buildings ===
Tatton Hall is listed at Grade I, and the Old Hall is listed at Grade II*. Knutsford Lodge Gateway and Gates are also listed at Grade II*, while Rostherne Lodge is listed at Grade II. A number of items in the gardens and grounds are listed at Grade II, namely the Upper Terrace Wall, the flight of steps between the Intermediate and Lower Terraces, the wall and balustrade of the Lower Terrace, the walls of the Service Court, the pool wall and Triton Fountain in the Lower Terrace, and the Eastern and Western Vases on the Lower Terrace.

=== Events ===
A programme of events is organised in the hall, garden and parkland. These include the annual RHS Show Tatton Park arranged by the Royal Horticultural Society, car shows, concerts, courses and craft and antique fairs. Tatton Park is also home to one of the seven national Foodies Festivals. Parts of the hall and gardens can be hired for celebrations, weddings, and for conferences and meetings.

== See also ==
- Grade I listed buildings in Cheshire East
- Grade II* listed buildings in Cheshire East
