= Maurice Egerton, 4th Baron Egerton =

British Baron (1874–1958)

- Maurice Egerton, 4th Baron Egerton, in Royal Navy uniform
- Tenure: 1920 – 1958
- Predecessor: Alan Egerton, 3rd Baron Egerton
- Successor: barony became extinct
- Born: 4 August 1874
- Died: 30 January 1958 (aged 83)
- Noble family: Egerton family Wilbraham Egerton, 1st Earl Egerton (uncle); Beatrix Lucia Catherine Tollemache (aunt); William Egerton, 1st Baron Egerton (grandfather)
- Father: Alan Egerton, 3rd Baron Egerton

Maurice Egerton, 4th Baron Egerton (4 August 1874 – 30 January 1958) was a member of the Egerton family and was the only son of Alan de Tatton Egerton, 3rd Baron Egerton and his wife Lady Anna Louisa.

== Biography ==
Egerton was known as an aviation and motor car enthusiast, a friend to the Wright brothers. His name is listed on the Memorial to the Home of Aviation on the Isle of Sheppey, marking him out as a pioneering early aviator.

Egerton served as lieutenant in the Royal Naval Volunteer Reserve during the First World War after which he was granted some land in Ngata area near Nakuru in Kenya under the Soldier Settlement Scheme. He later purchased a further 21,000 acres around the same area from Lord Delamere. On this land, Egerton founded a school in 1939 named Egerton Farm School (now Egerton University). The school was meant to prepare white European youth for careers in agriculture. Also on his land he built Lord Egerton Castle from 1938 to 1954.

Egerton did not marry and on his death in 1958 the barony became extinct, and Tatton Park was given to the National Trust while Lord Egerton Castle was given to Egerton University, who manage it to this day.

Peerage of the United Kingdom
Preceded by Alan Egerton	Baron Egerton; 1920–1958	Extinct
