= 2023 Cheshire West and Chester Council election =

- 4 May 2023

All 70 seats on Cheshire West and Chester Council 36 seats needed for a majority
- Turnout: 36.1% (▲1.4 pp)

	First party	Second party	Third party
Leader	Louise Gittins	Margaret Parker
Party	Labour	Conservative	Independent
Leader since	10 May 2019	9 May 2019
Leader's seat	Little Neston	Gowy Rural
Last election	35 seats, 36.74%	28 seats, 39.17%	4 seats, 5.81%
Seats before	33	28	6
Seats won	39	23	5
Seat change	▲6	▼5	▼1
Popular vote	69,841	51,969	11,140
Percentage	42.55%	31.66%	6.79%
Swing	▲5.81 pp	▼7.51 pp	▲0.98 pp
	Fourth party	Fifth party
Leader	Paul Bowers (Note: As the only Green councillor, Bowers was their de facto group leader. He was not subsequently returned at this election.)	Paul Roberts
Party	Green	Liberal Democrats
Leader since	2 May 2019
Leader's seat	Helsby (stood in Tarvin & Kelsall this time)	Farndon (defeated)
Last election	1 seat, 5.35%	2 seats, 12.25%
Seats before	1	2
Seats won	2	1
Seat change	▲1	▼1
Popular vote	9,192	21,092
Percentage	5.6%	12.85%
Swing	▲0.25 pp	▲0.6 pp
- Result by wards
Leader before election
Louise Gittins
Labour
No overall control
Leader after election
Louise Gittins
Labour

The 2023 Cheshire West and Chester Council election took place on 4 May 2023 to elect members of Cheshire West and Chester Council in England. This was on the same day as other local elections, including contested elections in the civil parishes of Broxton, Dutton, Great Boughton (Note: North ward only.), Mouldsworth and Tarporley and the towns of Frodsham (Note: Waterside ward only.), Northwich (Note: All wards except Northwich Witton.) and Winsford.

The council had been under no overall control prior to the election, being run by a Labour minority administration. Labour won a majority on the council at this election, taking 39 of the 70 seats.

== Wards and candidates ==
Seat composition between 2019 (top) and 2023 (bottom):

35	28	4	2	1

The Statement of Persons Nominated for each electoral ward was published on 5 April 2023, twenty-four hours after nominations closed.

=== New councillors ===
- Sherin Akhtar (Labour, Upton)
- Martin Beveridge (Independent, Winsford Gravel)
- Stuart Bingham (Labour, Winsford Over and Verdin)
- Simon Boone (Labour, Winsford Swanlow)
- Matt Carter (Labour, Handbridge Park)
- Paul Chamberlain (Labour, Chester City and The Garden Quarter)
- Tom Cooper (Conservative, Tarvin and Kelsall)
- Chris Copeman (Green, Helsby)
- Felicity Davies (Labour, Northwich Winnington and Castle)
- Olwyn Dean (Labour, Rudheath)
- Caroline Ellis (Labour, Sutton Villages)
- Michael Garvey (Labour, Frodsham)
- Charles Hardy (Conservative, Tarporley)
- Katie Kendrick (Labour, Netherpool)
- Katrina Kerr (Labour, Chester City and The Garden Quarter)
- Martin Loftus (Conservative, Hartford and Greenbank)
- Ted Lush (Liberal Democrats, Tarvin and Kelsall)
- Elizabeth MacGlashan (Labour, Great Boughton)
- Dan Marr (Conservative, Davenham, Moulton and Kingsmead)
- Arthur Neil (Labour, Northwich Winnington and Castle)
- Phil Rimmer (Conservative, Weaver and Cuddington)
- John Roach (Green, Whitby Park)
- Jimmy Shannon (Labour, Whitby Groves)
- Gaynor Sinar (Conservative, Davenham, Moulton and Kingsmead)
- Alan Smith (Labour, Blacon)
- Lynn Stocks (Conservative, Weaver and Cuddington)
- Lucy Sumner (Labour, Frodsham)
- Alex Tate (Labour, Lache)
- Adrian Waddelove (Conservative, Farndon)
- Ben Walker (Labour, Chester City and The Garden Quarter)

=== Outgoing councillors ===
- Val Armstrong (Labour) (Note: Did not stand for election.)
- Chris Basey (Conservative)
- Mike Baynham (Independent)
- Keith Board (Conservative)
- Paul Bowers (Green)
- Kate Cernik (Labour)
- Robert Cernik (Labour)
- Martyn Delaney (Independent)
- Samantha Dixon (Labour)
- Charles Fifield (Conservative)
- Mal Gaskill (Liberal Democrats)
- Phil Herbert (Conservative)
- Jill Houlbrook (Conservative)
- Brian Jones (Labour)
- John Leather (Conservative)
- Nicole Meardon (Labour)
- Joanne Moorcroft (Labour)
- Eveleigh Moore Dutton (Independent)
- Trish Richards (Labour)
- Lynn Riley (Conservative)
- Diane Roberts (Labour)
- Paul Roberts (Liberal Democrats)
- Peter Rooney (Labour)
- Bob Rudd (Labour)
- Neil Sullivan (Conservative)
- Harry Tonge (Conservative)
- Helen Treeby (Conservative)
- Elton Watson (Conservative)
- Helen Weltman (Conservative)
- Paul Williams (Conservative)

=== Re-elected councillors ===
- Martin Barker (Independent, Parkgate)
- Richard Beacham (Labour, Newton and Hoole)
- Robert Bisset (Labour, Central and Grange)
- Tommy Blackmore (Labour, Winsford Over and Verdin)
- Matt Bryan (Labour, Upton)
- Mandy Clare (Independent, Winsford Dene)
- Steve Collings (Labour, Great Boughton)
- Andrew Cooper (Labour, Northwich Leftwich)
- Razia Daniels (Conservative, Handbridge Park)
- Lisa Denson (Labour, Westminster)
- Hugo Deynem (Conservative, Sandstone)
- Paul Donovan (Labour, Sutton Villages)
- Simon Eardley (Conservative, Saughall and Mollington)
- Gillian Edwards (Independent, Weaver and Cuddington)
- Michael Edwardson (Labour, Wolverham)
- Carol Gahan (Labour, Blacon)
- Lynn Gibbon (Conservative, Marbury)
- Louise Gittins (Labour, Little Neston)
- Gareth Gould (Labour, Strawberry)
- Graham Heatley (Conservative, Gowy Rural)
- Myles Hogg (Conservative, Willaston and Thornton)
- Mike Jones (Conservative, Tattenhall)
- Adam Langan (Labour, Newton and Hoole)
- Gina Lewis (Labour, Winsford Over and Verdin)
- Sheila Little (Labour, Blacon)
- Phil Marshall (Conservative, Marbury)
- Keith Millar (Labour, Neston)
- Sam Naylor (Labour, Northwich Witton)
- Nathan Pardoe (Labour, Winsford Wharton)
- Margaret Parker (Conservative, Gowy Rural)
- Stuart Parker (Conservative, Christleton and Huntington)
- Patricia Parkes (Conservative, Hartford and Greenbank)
- Karen Shore (Labour, Central and Grange)
- Mark Stocks (Conservative, Shakerley)
- Christine Warner (Labour, Ledsham and Manor)
- Gill Watson (Labour, Newton and Hoole)
- Peter Wheeler (Labour, Ledsham and Manor)
- Mark Williams (Conservative, Christleton and Huntington)
- Rachel Williams (Conservative, Malpas)
- Norman Wright (Conservative, Marbury)

=== Seat changes ===
Conservative to Labour (7)

- Frodsham (2 seats)
- Great Boughton (1 seat)
- Handbridge Park (1 seat)
- Rudheath
- Upton (1 seat)
- Winsford Over and Verdin (1 seat)

Conservative to Liberal Democrat (1)

- Tarvin (1 seat)

Independent to Conservative (2)

- Hartford and Greenbank (1 seat)
- Tarporley

Labour to Green (1)

- Whitby Park

Labour to Independent (2)

- Winsford Dene
- Winsford Gravel

Liberal Democrat to Conservative (1)

- Farndon

Liberal Democrat to Independent (1)

- Winsford Swanlow

== Ward results ==
=== Blacon ===
Blacon (3 seats)
Party	Candidate	Votes	%
Labour	Sheila Little	1,689	70.67
Labour	Carol Gahan	1,687	70.59
Labour	Alan Smith	1,561	65.31
Conservative	Christopher Hughes	392	16.40
Conservative	Benjamin Fletcher	382	15.98
Conservative	Maria Jombikova	347	14.52
Green	Simon Brown	301	12.59
Liberal Democrats	Kris Patterson	194	8.12
Turnout		2,390	24.8
Labour hold			
Labour hold			
Labour hold			

=== Central and Grange ===
Central and Grange (2 seats)
Party	Candidate	Votes	%
Labour	Karen Shore	1,169	73.02
Labour	Robert Bisset	1,085	67.77
Liberal Democrats	Lizzie Jewkes	208	12.99
Conservative	Nicholas Lacey	171	10.68
Conservative	David Rowlands	163	10.18
Turnout		1,601	20.1
Labour hold			
Labour hold			

=== Chester City and the Garden Quarter ===
Chester City and the Garden Quarter (3 seats)
Party	Candidate	Votes	%
Labour	Paul Chamberlain	2,229	59.74
Labour	Katrina Kerr	2,176	58.32
Labour	Ben Walker	2,136	57.25
Conservative	Max Gerrard	748	20.05
Conservative	Kate Vaughan	725	19.43
Conservative	Matthew Morgan	678	18.17
Green	Kerry Taylor-Brown	520	13.94
Independent	Martyn Delaney	402	10.77
Liberal Democrats	Timothy Longman	353	9.46
Liberal Democrats	Przemyslaw Rusak	181	4.85
Liberal Democrats	Alexander Tolani	181	4.85
Turnout		3,731	31.4
Labour hold			
Labour hold			
Labour hold			

=== Christleton and Huntington ===
Christleton and Huntington (2 seats)
Party	Candidate	Votes	%
Conservative	Mark Williams	976	27.12
Conservative	Stuart Parker	900	25.00
Green	Steve Davies	876	24.34
Labour	Max Hudson	794	22.06
Green	Nick Brown	749	20.81
Independent	Dave Whitehead	684	19.01
Liberal Democrats	Chris Ward	667	18.53
Labour	Tommy Williams	665	18.48
Liberal Democrats	Bob Thompson	524	14.56
Turnout		3,599	43.2
Conservative hold			
Conservative hold			

=== Davenham, Moulton and Kingsmead ===
Davenham, Moulton and Kingsmead (2 seats)
Party	Candidate	Votes	%
Conservative	Dan Marr	1,289	47.20
Conservative	Gaynor Sinar	1,220	44.67
Labour	Paul Dolan	988	36.18
Independent	Simon McDonald	527	19.30
Liberal Democrats	Vikki Moran	445	16.29
Liberal Democrats	Jack Price-Harbach	394	14.43
Turnout		2,731	33.0
Conservative hold			
Conservative hold			

=== Farndon ===
Farndon (1 seat)
Party	Candidate	Votes	%
Conservative	Adrian Waddelove	852	47.44
Liberal Democrats	Paul Roberts	828	46.10
Labour	Conran Tickle	89	4.96
Green	Daniel Owen	27	1.50
Turnout			48.8
Conservative gain from Liberal Democrats			

=== Frodsham ===
Frodsham (2 seats)
Party	Candidate	Votes	%
Labour	Michael Garvey	1,537	49.04
Labour	Lucy Sumner	1,422	45.37
Conservative	Lynn Riley	1,162	37.08
Conservative	Sara Wakefield	1,024	32.67
Green	Christine Webber	312	9.96
Liberal Democrats	Patrick Eakin	235	7.50
Reform	Jason Moorcroft	162	5.17
Liberal Democrats	Ross Sibson	150	4.79
Turnout		3,134	43.1
Labour gain from Conservative			
Labour gain from Conservative			

=== Gowy Rural ===
Gowy Rural (2 seats)
Party	Candidate	Votes	%
Conservative	Margaret Parker	1,122	44.81
Conservative	Graham Heatley	1,121	44.77
Labour	John Stockton	1,048	41.85
Green	Jackie Tait	563	22.48
Liberal Democrats	Andrew Hyde	275	10.98
Liberal Democrats	Trevor Jones	193	7.71
Turnout		2,504	35.1
Conservative hold			
Conservative hold			

=== Great Boughton ===
Great Boughton (2 seats)
Party	Candidate	Votes	%
Labour	Steve Collings	1,866	47.42
Labour	Elizabeth MacGlashan	1,736	44.12
Conservative	Ashley Avery-Bennett	1,214	30.85
Conservative	David Barter	1,200	30.50
Liberal Democrats	Rob Herd	732	18.60
Liberal Democrats	John Salt	458	11.64
Green	Karen Brown	218	5.54
Green	Barry Brown	168	4.27
TUSC	Mark Pearson	45	1.14
Turnout		3,935	46.5
Labour hold			
Labour gain from Conservative			

=== Handbridge Park ===
Handbridge Park (2 seats)
Party	Candidate	Votes	%
Labour	Matt Carter	1,811	46.87
Conservative	Razia Daniels	1,712	44.31
Labour	Michael Robert Mitchell	1,691	43.76
Conservative	Neil Anthony Sullivan	1,536	39.75
Green	Tom Barker	308	7.97
Liberal Democrats	Sarah Victoria Charlotte Roberts	199	5.15
Liberal Democrats	Jonathan Daniel Rule	145	3.75
Turnout		3,864	51.7
Labour gain from Conservative			
Conservative hold			

=== Hartford and Greenbank ===
Hartford and Greenbank (2 seats)
Party	Candidate	Votes	%
Conservative	Martin David Loftus	1,223	48.15
Conservative	Patricia Mary Parkes	1,203	47.36
Labour	Graham John Emmett	805	31.69
Labour	Jane Thomas	764	30.08
Liberal Democrats	Val Godfrey	328	12.91
Green	Sue Beesley	312	12.28
Liberal Democrats	Richard James Dawson	236	9.29
Turnout		2,540	36.8
Conservative gain from Independent			
Conservative hold			

=== Helsby ===
Helsby (1 seat)
Party	Candidate	Votes	%
Green	Chris Copeman	908	54.31
Labour	Pauline Elizabeth Lowrie	382	22.85
Conservative	Stephen Brendan Garrity	355	21.23
Liberal Democrats	David Heath	27	1.61
Turnout			40.4
Green hold			

=== Lache ===
Lache (1 seat)
Party	Candidate	Votes	%
Labour	Alex Tate	807	62.36
Conservative	Gareth Lawrence	368	28.44
Green	Christine McArdle Davies	76	5.87
Liberal Democrats	John Hall	43	3.32
Turnout			33.7
Labour hold			

=== Ledsham and Manor ===
Ledsham and Manor (2 seats)
Party	Candidate	Votes	%
Labour	Peter Joseph Wheeler	1,673	55.42
Labour	Christine Veronica Williams Warner	1,544	51.14
Conservative	Nicholas Hebson	821	27.19
Conservative	Ike Efobi	809	26.80
Independent	Mark Andrew Hartley	440	14.57
Liberal Democrats	Graham Handley	271	8.98
Turnout		3,019	38.7
Labour hold			
Labour hold			

=== Little Neston ===
Little Neston (1 seat)
Party	Candidate	Votes	%
Labour	Louise Gittins	1,271	61.40
Conservative	Steve Wastell	651	31.45
Green	David Oldham	74	3.57
Liberal Democrats	Geoff Swaffer	74	3.57
Turnout			50.9
Labour hold			

=== Malpas ===
Malpas (1 seat)
Party	Candidate	Votes	%
Conservative	Rachel Williams	839	56.96
Liberal Democrats	Charles Higgie	534	36.25
Labour	Stephen Burns	100	6.79
Turnout			38.4
Conservative hold			

=== Marbury ===
Marbury (3 seats)
Party	Candidate	Votes	%
Conservative	Norman Geoffrey Wright	1,379	39.52
Conservative	Lynn Joyce Gibbon	1,328	38.06
Conservative	Phil Marshall	1,306	37.43
Liberal Democrats	Roy Garton	1,297	37.17
Liberal Democrats	Sam Dodgshon	1,296	37.15
Liberal Democrats	Annie Makepeace	1,135	32.53
Labour	Catriona Stewart	918	26.31
Alliance for Democracy and Freedom	Alistair John Nicholls	308	8.83
Turnout		3,489	35.1
Conservative hold			
Conservative hold			
Conservative hold			

=== Neston ===
Neston (1 seat)
Party	Candidate	Votes	%
Labour	Keith Millar	894	67.37
Conservative	John Turnbull	328	24.72
Liberal Democrats	Matthew Crook	105	7.91
Turnout			33.1
Labour hold			

=== Netherpool ===
Netherpool (1 seat)
Party	Candidate	Votes	%
Labour	Katie Kendrick	895	69.70
Conservative	Richard Soper	303	29.60
Liberal Democrats	Rosemarie Quinn	86	6.70
Turnout			31.1
Labour hold			

=== Newton and Hoole ===
Newton and Hoole (3 seats)
Party	Candidate	Votes	%
Labour	Richard Mark Beacham	2,956	66.06
Labour	Gill Watson	2,718	60.74
Labour	Adam Langan	2,672	59.71
Conservative	Suzanne Booth	859	19.20
Green	Molly Wilderspin-Jones	780	17.43
Conservative	Robert Daniel Jones	664	14.84
Conservative	Rebecca Wimpey	647	14.46
Liberal Democrats	Rose Price	339	7.58
Liberal Democrats	Neil Connan Christian	316	7.06
Liberal Democrats	Bev Fraser	300	6.70
TUSC	Kenny Cunningham	135	3.02
Freedom Alliance. Stop the Great Reset	Christopher William Aberdeen	134	2.99
Turnout		4,475	41.2
Labour hold			
Labour hold			
Labour hold			

=== Northwich Leftwich ===
Northwich Leftwich (1 seat)
Party	Candidate	Votes	%
Labour	Andrew Graham Cooper	602	59.19
Conservative	Harry James William Sharrock	304	29.89
Reform	Emma Claire Guy	56	5.51
Liberal Democrats	Trevor David Hampson	55	5.41
Turnout			28.5
Labour hold			

=== Northwich Winnington and Castle ===
Northwich Winnington and Castle (2 seats)
Party	Candidate	Votes	%
Labour	Arthur Leslie Neil	947	48.39
Labour	Felicity Laura Janet Davies	853	43.59
Liberal Democrats	Lee Siddall	824	42.11
Liberal Democrats	Keith Hinde	394	20.13
Conservative	Max Alexander Hills	330	16.86
Conservative	Olivia Abigail Newey	268	13.69
Turnout		1,957	28.7
Labour hold			
Labour hold			

=== Northwich Witton ===
Northwich Witton (1 seat)
Party	Candidate	Votes	%
Labour	Sam Naylor	592	68.52
Conservative	Derek Andrew Smith	194	22.45
Liberal Democrats	Alice Philippa Chapman	78	9.03
Turnout			23.9
Labour hold			

=== Parkgate ===
Parkgate (1 seat)
Party	Candidate	Votes	%
Independent	Martin Trevor Barker	955	53.29
Conservative	Lynn Turnbull	372	20.76
Labour	Paul Doughty	347	19.36
Green	Drew Bellis	72	4.02
Liberal Democrats	John Derry Lawrence Edwards	46	2.57
Turnout			45.5
Independent hold			

=== Rudheath ===
Rudheath (1 seat)
Party	Candidate	Votes	%
Labour	Olwyn Denise Dean	553	48.05
Conservative	Helen Treeby	523	45.44
Liberal Democrats	Griff Griffiths	75	6.52
Turnout			27.7
Labour gain from Conservative			

=== Sandstone ===
Sandstone (1 seat)
Party	Candidate	Votes	%
Conservative	Hugo William Edward Deynem	864	50.85
Labour	Julie Dilworth	453	26.66
Liberal Democrats	Audrey Isobel Griffiths	214	12.6
Green	Alexandra Dedman	168	9.89
Turnout			42.4
Conservative hold			

=== Saughall and Mollington ===
Saughall and Mollington (1 seat)
Party	Candidate	Votes	%
Conservative	Simon James Vernon Eardley	1,048	59.85
Labour	Howard Timothy Jennings	567	32.38
Green	Jane Barker	76	4.34
Liberal Democrats	Sandra Mary Hall	60	3.43
Turnout			42.2
Conservative hold			

=== Shakerley ===
Shakerley (1 seat)
Party	Candidate	Votes	%
Conservative	Mark Lister Stocks	605	49.51
Labour	Andy Stott	335	27.41
Liberal Democrats	John David Harding	210	17.18
Green	Jon Stutfield	72	5.89
Turnout			30.9
Conservative hold			

=== Strawberry ===
Strawberry (1 seat)
Party	Candidate	Votes	%
Labour	Gareth David Gould	972	68.64
Conservative	Andrew Wade Merrill	349	24.65
Liberal Democrats	Rob Hall-Jones	95	6.71
Turnout			35.0
Labour hold			

=== Sutton Villages ===
Sutton Villages (2 seats)
Party	Candidate	Votes	%
Labour	Paul Francis Donovan	1,624	76.60
Labour	Caroline Olwyn Ellis	1,444	68.11
Conservative	Helen Louise Kelly	374	17.64
Conservative	Derek Harold Dickson	352	16.60
Liberal Democrats	Les Litwin	147	6.93
Turnout		2,120	27.2
Labour hold			
Labour hold			

=== Tarporley ===
Tarporley (1 seat)
Party	Candidate	Votes	%
Conservative	Charles Robert Hardy	861	46.02
Independent	Eveleigh Hilda Moore Dutton	810	43.29
Labour	Cathy Reynolds	136	7.27
Green	Anna Elise Crowder	64	3.42
Turnout			46.4
Conservative gain from Independent			

=== Tarvin and Kelsall ===
Tarvin and Kelsall (2 seats)
Party	Candidate	Votes	%
Liberal Democrats	Ted Lush	1,332	46.59
Conservative	Tom Cooper	1,226	42.88
Conservative	Thomas John Patrick Carey	1,085	37.95
Liberal Democrats	Tim Mobbs	944	33.02
Labour	Philip Alvin Tate	420	14.69
Green	Paul Richard Bowers	393	13.75
Turnout		2,859	39.1
Liberal Democrats gain from Conservative			
Conservative hold			

=== Tattenhall ===
Tattenhall (1 seat)
Party	Candidate	Votes	%
Conservative	Mike Jones	797	46.58
Labour	Michael David Foster	605	35.36
Green	Charlie Cooke	194	11.34
Liberal Democrats	Vera Sandra Roberts	115	6.72
Turnout			44.0
Conservative hold			

=== Upton ===
Upton (2 seats)
Party	Candidate	Votes	%
Labour	Matt Bryan	1,647	50.57
Labour	Sherin Akhtar	1,598	49.06
Conservative	Jill Houlbrook	1,319	40.50
Conservative	Steven Hesketh	1,057	32.45
Green	Helen Louise Wilman	304	9.33
Liberal Democrats	Noel Francis McGlinchey	201	6.17
Liberal Democrats	Ian Hopkinson	134	4.11
Turnout		3,257	43.8
Labour hold			
Labour gain from Conservative			

=== Weaver and Cuddington ===
Weaver and Cuddington (3 seats)
Party	Candidate	Votes	%
Independent	Gillian Edwards	2,931	65.12
Conservative	Lynn Marie Stocks	1,515	33.66
Conservative	Phil Rimmer	1,498	33.28
Labour	Kate Cernik	1,434	31.86
Conservative	Adam Wordsworth	1,327	29.48
Labour	Bob Cernik	1,228	27.28
Liberal Democrats	Stephen Mark Donhue	1,091	24.24
Turnout		4,501	39.4
Independent hold			
Conservative hold			
Conservative hold			

=== Westminster ===
Westminster (1 seat)
Party	Candidate	Votes	%
Labour	Lisa Valerie Denson	630	79.55
Conservative	Linda Ellen Jones	79	9.97
Reform	Darren Lee Simon Lythgoe	48	6.06
Liberal Democrats	Janet Boys Cole	35	4.42
Turnout			22.2
Labour hold			

=== Whitby Groves ===
Whitby Groves (1 seat)
Party	Candidate	Votes	%
Labour	Jimmy Shannon	678	44.03
Green	Kate Grannell	649	42.14
Conservative	Brian Anderson	213	13.83
Turnout			42.5
Labour hold			

=== Whitby Park ===
Whitby Park (1 seat)
Party	Candidate	Votes	%
Green	John William Roach	864	52.52
Labour	Peter Anthony Rooney	613	37.26
Conservative	Luke James Sharples	130	7.90
Liberal Democrats	Kurt Jewkes	38	2.31
Turnout			41.7
Green gain from Labour			

=== Willaston and Thornton ===
Willaston and Thornton (1 seat)
Party	Candidate	Votes	%
Conservative	Myles Hogg	1,102	60.88
Labour	Matthew Bracken	479	26.46
Green	Robina Elizabeth Hetherington	144	7.96
Liberal Democrats	Carol Anne Braithwaite	85	4.7
Turnout			43.9
Conservative hold			

=== Winsford Dene ===
Winsford Dene (1 seat)
Party	Candidate	Votes	%
Independent	Mandy Clare	499	45.95
Labour	Denise Bingham	393	36.19
Liberal Democrats	Bob Barton	99	9.12
Conservative	Felicity Roochove	95	8.75
Turnout			29.0
Independent gain from Labour			

=== Winsford Gravel ===
Winsford Gravel (1 seat)
Party	Candidate	Votes	%
Independent	Martin David Beveridge	441	45.05
Labour	Joanne Elizabeth Moorcroft	380	38.82
Conservative	Victoria Elizabeth Relf	125	12.77
Liberal Democrats	Richard Neil Dutton	33	3.37
Turnout			31.2
Independent gain from Labour			

=== Winsford Over and Verdin ===
Windsford Over and Verdin (3 seats)
Party	Candidate	Votes	%
Labour	Tommy Blackmore	1,061	33.95
Labour	Stuart John Bingham	1,037	33.18
Labour	Gina Lewis	996	31.87
Independent	Dan Ford	897	28.70
Independent	Wayne David Fletcher	877	28.06
Independent	Claire Louise Broughton	848	27.14
Liberal Democrats	Charlie Parkinson	551	17.63
Conservative	Adam Boulton-Rawlinson	542	17.34
Conservative	Carole Hilda Cozier	539	17.25
Liberal Democrats	Helena Miriam Bernadette Conlon	537	17.18
Conservative	Graham William Spencer	521	16.67
Liberal Democrats	Danny Bond	489	15.65
Turnout		3,125	29.2
Labour hold			
Labour gain from Conservative			
Labour hold			

=== Winsford Swanlow ===
Winsford Swanlow (1 seat)
Party	Candidate	Votes	%
Independent	Simon Laurence Boone	485	37.80
Labour	Lyndsay Barwell	327	25.49
Liberal Democrats	Malcolm Ian Gaskill	300	23.38
Conservative	Adrian Richard Morgan	171	13.33
Turnout			37.4
Independent gain from Liberal Democrats			

=== Winsford Wharton ===
Winsford Wharton (1 seat)
Party	Candidate	Votes	%
Labour	Nathan Pardoe	444	46.93
Independent	Graham Newton	282	29.81
Liberal Democrats	Bev Theron	86	9.09
Conservative	Sandra Jane Hardy	72	7.61
Independent	Will Charlton	62	6.55
Turnout			26.6
Labour hold			

=== Wolverham ===
Wolverham (1 seat)
Party	Candidate	Votes	%
Labour	Michael Edwardson	668	79.71
Conservative	Sam Corner	95	11.34
Liberal Democrats	Alec Owen Jones	75	8.98
Turnout			23.0
Labour hold			

== Changes 2023–2027 ==
- Gill Watson, elected as a Labour councillor for Newton and Hoole, had the whip withdrawn in May 2023 in a dispute over financial contributions to the local Labour group, and has sat as an independent since.
- Matt Bryan, elected as a Labour councillor for Upton, resigned from the council's cabinet in September 2023 and had the whip withdrawn pending investigation, and has sat as a non-aligned independent since.
- Mandy Clare, elected as an independent councillor for Winsford Dene, joined the Party of Women in March 2024, before resigning her membership in July 2024 to sit as an independent again. She went on to join Reform UK in March 2025.
- Graham Heatley, elected as a Conservative councillor for Gowy Rural, defected to Reform UK in April 2025.
- Jimmy Shannon (Whitby Groves) and Elizabeth MacGlashan (Great Boughton), both elected as Labour councillors, left the party in June 2025 to sit as independents, resulting in the council losing its overall Labour majority. Shannon went on to join the Green Party in April 2026, becoming the first sitting Cheshire councillor to do so.
- Mark Williams, elected as a Conservative councillor for Christleton and Huntington, defected to Reform UK in September 2025, becoming the second Cheshire West and Chester Conservative councillor to do so after Heatley.

=== By-elections ===
==== Wolverham ====
The Wolverham by-election was triggered by the resignation of Labour councillor Michael Edwardson.

Wolverham by-election: 2 May 2024
Party	Candidate	Votes	%
Labour	John Robert Stockton	576	69.1
Green	Katie Sarah Grannell	73	8.8
Independent	Jonathan Charles Starkey	64	7.7
Party of Women	Sally Ann James	42	5.0
Liberal Democrats	Elizabeth Jewkes	35	4.2
Conservative	Luke James Sharples	31	3.7
Turnout		833	22.8
Labour hold			

==== Northwich Leftwich ====
The Northwich Leftwich by-election was triggered when Labour councillor Andrew Cooper resigned his seat after being elected Member of Parliament for Mid Cheshire at the 2024 United Kingdom general election, held on the same day.

Northwich Leftwich by-election: 4 July 2024
Party	Candidate	Votes	%
Labour	Rachel Waterman	978	48.3
Reform	Emma Guy	366	18.1
Conservative	Penny Hitch	363	17.9
Liberal Democrats	John David Harding	163	8.0
Green	Jonathan Paul Stutfield	151	7.5
Turnout		2,025	54.5
Labour hold			

==== Strawberry ====
The Strawberry by-election was triggered by the resignation of Labour councillor Gareth Gould on health grounds.

Strawberry by-election: 2 October 2025
Party	Candidate	Votes	%
Labour	Kris Fisher	602	35.8
Reform	Jason Moorcroft	539	32.0
Independent	Ray McHale	231	13.7
Conservative	Nicholas Hebson	132	7.8
Liberal Democrats	Lizzie Jewkes	121	7.2
Green	Paul Bowers	58	3.4
Turnout		1,686	41.6
Labour hold			

==== Willaston and Thornton ====
The by-election was caused by the death of Conservative councillor Myles Hogg on 12 November 2025.

Willaston and Thornton by-election: 22 January 2026
Party	Candidate	Votes	%
Conservative	Sion Roberts	997	53.8
Labour	Edd Flynn	318	17.5
Reform	Richard Hare	299	16.1
Liberal Democrats	Carol Braithwaite	132	7.1
Green	David Hoare	107	5.8
Turnout		1,853	42.7
Conservative hold			

==== Christleton and Huntington ====
The by-election was caused by the death of Conservative councillor Stuart Parker MBE on 5 April 2026.

Christleton and Huntington by-election: 11 June 2026
Party	Candidate	Votes	%
Conservative	Stephen Mosley	1,214	32.9
Green	Steve Davies	1,122	30.4
Reform	Martin Andrew Kemp	749	17.2
Labour	Fran Riley	389	10.5
Liberal Democrats	Chris Ward	331	9.0
Turnout		3,694	44.6
Conservative hold			

==== Weaver and Cuddington ====
The by-election was triggered by the resignation of Conservative councillor Phil Rimmer, who stood down with immediate effect due to a change in professional and personal circumstances.

Weaver and Cuddington by-election: 2 July 2026
Party	Candidate	Votes	%
Independent	Gabrielle Goad	1,365	35.6
Conservative	Patrick Melody	974	25.4
Reform	Adam Wordsworth	778	20.3
Labour	Robert Cernik	564	14.7
Liberal Democrats	Elizabeth Jewkes	142	3.7
Turnout		3,831	34.2
Independent gain from Conservative			
