= 1876 Mid Cheshire by-election =

UK Parliamentary by-election

The 1876 Mid Cheshire by-election was held on 18 July 1876. The by-election was held due to the death of the incumbent Conservative MP, Egerton Leigh who had held the seat since his election in 1873. The seat was won in 1876 by the Conservative candidate Piers Egerton-Warburton. This election was uncontested.
