= Baron Egerton =

Title in the United Kingdom

Baron Egerton, of Tatton in the County Palatine of Chester, was a title in the Peerage of the United Kingdom. It was created on 15 April 1859 for William Egerton (1806–1883), a politician from the Egerton family.

== History ==
William Egerton (1806–1883) had earlier represented Lymington and Cheshire North in the House of Commons. His branch of the Egerton family is descended in the female line from Thomas Egerton, of Tatton Park in Cheshire, youngest son of John Egerton, 2nd Earl of Bridgewater. Thomas Egerton's granddaughter Hester Egerton (died 1780) married William Tatton. In 1780 they assumed by Royal licence the surname of Egerton in lieu of Tatton. Their son William Tatton Egerton sat as Member of Parliament for Chester. His son Wilbraham Egerton also represented this constituency in the House of Commons. He was the father of William Egerton, who was elevated to the peerage in 1859.

The 1st Baron Egerton died in 1883 and was succeeded by his eldest son Wilbraham. The 2nd Baron Egerton was Member of Parliament for Cheshire North and Cheshire Mid and served as Chairman of the Manchester Ship Canal. On 22 July 1897 he was created Viscount Salford, in the County Palatine of Lancaster, and Earl Egerton, of Tatton in the County Chester. Both titles were in the Peerage of the United Kingdom. The 1st Earl Egerton had one daughter but no sons and on his death in 1909 the viscountcy and earldom became extinct.

He was succeeded in the barony by his younger brother, the 3rd Baron Egerton. He had previously represented Cheshire Mid and Knutsford in Parliament. When he died, the titles passed to his son, Maurice Egerton, the 4th Baron. On his death in 1958 the barony became extinct, and Tatton Park was given to the National Trust.

Edward Christopher Egerton, younger brother of the first Baron, sat as Member of Parliament for Cheshire East. His grandson Henry Jack Egerton was a vice-admiral in the Royal Navy.

== Barons Egerton (1859) ==
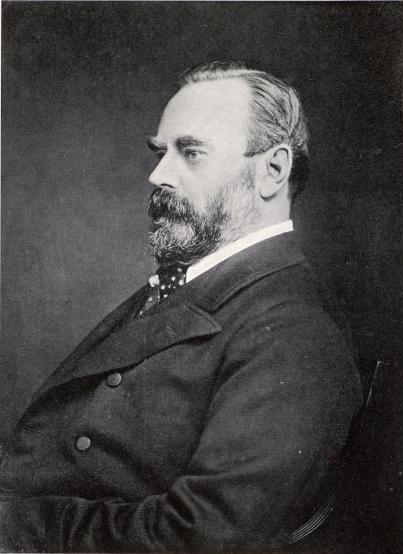
Wilbraham Egerton (1832–1909), the 2nd Baron, who was made 1st Earl Egerton in 1897

- William Tatton Egerton, 1st Baron Egerton (1806–1883)
- Wilbraham Egerton, 2nd Baron Egerton (1832–1909) (created Earl Egerton in 1897)

== Earl Egerton (1897) ==
- Wilbraham Egerton, 1st Earl Egerton (1832–1909)

== Barons Egerton (1859; Reverted) ==
- Alan de Tatton Egerton, 3rd Baron Egerton (1845–1920)
- Maurice Egerton, 4th Baron Egerton (1874–1958)

== See also ==
- Earl of Bridgewater (1617 creation)
