= High Legh =

Village in Cheshire, England

Coordinates: 53.352°N 2.451°W

High Legh, Cheshire
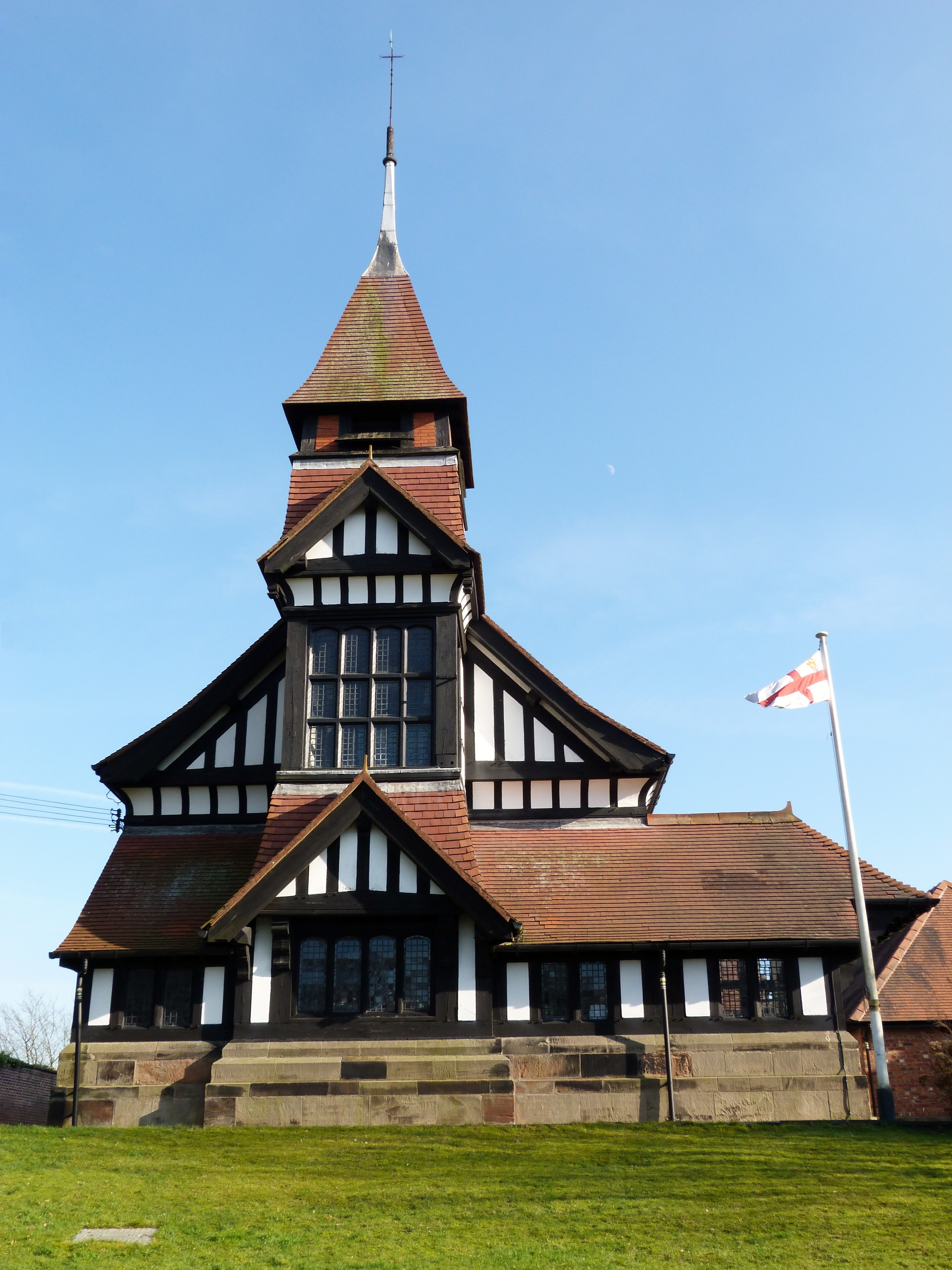
- Church of St John, High Legh (formerly domestic chapel to the West Hall)

- Location within Cheshire
- Population: 1,705
- OS grid reference: SJ700840
- Civil parish: High Legh
- Unitary authority: Cheshire East
- Ceremonial county: Cheshire
- Region: North West
- Country: England
- Sovereign state: United Kingdom
- Post town: Knutsford
- Postcode district: WA16
- Dialling code: 01925
- Police: Cheshire
- Fire: Cheshire
- Ambulance: North West
- UK Parliament: Tatton

High Legh is a village, civil and ecclesiastical parish in the unitary authority of Cheshire East and the ceremonial county of Cheshire, England. It is six miles (10 km) north west of Knutsford, seven miles (11 km) east of Warrington and twelve miles (19 km) south west of Manchester city centre. The population of the civil parish was estimated at 1,705 in 2019.

== History ==
Unusually this village was the seat of two ancient landed gentry families for generations, namely: Leigh of West Hall and Cornwall-Legh of East Hall. Both manor houses have now been demolished, but both families are still represented today, the head of the "West Hall" family being Edward Leigh and that of the "East Hall" family being headed by Richard, 6th Baron Grey of Codnor. A member of a cadet branch of the Leigh of West Hall family was created a baronet in 1773 as Sir Egerton Leigh, but this title is now dormant. Other cadet branches were the Leigh-Traffords of nearby Oughtrington Hall as well as the Barons Leigh of Stoneleigh Abbey in Warwickshire and the Barons Newton of Lyme Park. The third lordship of the manor was held by the Egerton family of Tatton Park and all three landed families swapped and consolidated their estates throughout the 18th and 19th centuries until the Egerton Leighs sold their High Legh estate to the Cornwall-Leghs just before World War I. When Maurice, 4th and last Lord Egerton of Tatton, sold off the remaining farms and land in High Legh in the 1930s, so ended a connection dating back to the 13th century.

East Hall was demolished in the early 1970s (as West Hall had been some 20 years previously) and the debris was used as foundations for the first Thelwall viaduct bridge of the M6 motorway. High Legh Hall (the East Hall) resembled nearby Tatton Park and the West Hall (Egerton Leigh family) was a beautiful Tudor building similar architecturally to Little Moreton Hall.

In a mainly agricultural area, its proximity to Manchester and the area now known as "Gold Trafford" has made it nowadays a desirable residential area.

High Legh was recorded in the Domesday Survey as having two Saxons theins (Ulviet or Wulfgeat, and Dob). The boundary between Mere and High Legh is still known as Dobb Lane and is, in fact, the medieval boundary between the two parishes. A moated site has been found, alongside the Roman road which connected Wilderspool and Latchford, Cheshire to Watling Street (A556) which contained Samian pottery from Cirencester, a Roman cloak clasp, and a flint knife. High Legh was also a high-status Bronze Age burial site. High Legh is the location of an early Methodist chapel in Northwood Lane, with Wesleyan connections. Northwood Methodist Chapel was founded by the Okell family of High Legh (who married into the Egerton Leigh (West Hall) family). In the early 19th century, Robert Moffat, a young Scottish man, came to work on the West Hall estate as a gardener, but in 1814 he joined the London Missionary Society and moved to Plantation Farm in Dukinfield. In 1816 he left with his wife for southern Africa where he became a missionary; his daughter met and fell in love with their student preacher, David Livingstone. The oldest building in the parish is believed to be St Mary's Chapel, formerly the domestic chapel of the Cornwall-Legh family of High Legh Hall (or East Hall), which is sometimes open to the public. However, other older buildings in the parish contain wattle and daub but no evidence of their dates has yet been established. The Anglican Church of St John was formerly the domestic chapel of the Leighs of West Hall (Egerton Leigh family).

The park of East Hall, High Legh was laid out by Humphrey Repton for George John Legh in 1791, and John Nash was also engaged to create an idyll village, but this was never completed. Repton removed the old toll road (the original Roman road) and dropped it to its present position (the A50), removing the village and creating a more enclosed entrance to the estate and pleasure gardens.

Both mansions were used by the government for the training of Royal Engineers during World War II after the families moved out; they never returned to their respective halls and subsequently sold the internal section of the estate to two building companies, Wimpey Homes, and Crossley Homes. In the 1980s more of the estate pleasure gardens was sold off for housing to Ideal Homes. In the 1990s another estate was built on the former Army camp buildings, now known as The Belfry. All the street names in these developments have a connection with the history of High Legh through either one of the ancient landed families (Legh & Leigh), prominent people within the parish or parts of the former park (Pheasant Walk).

== Transport ==
On 10 October 2009, High Legh Railway (a 7 1/4-inch (180 mm) gauge 400-yard (370 m) railway) was opened by Louise Robbins (Headteacher of High Legh Primary School). On 26 November 2011, the railway was extended further making the route a little short of 900 yards (820 m). The extension was opened by Harold Brooks (in the guise of Father Christmas) and Frank Sidebottom from the 7 1/4 Inch Gauge Society; High Legh Railway is operated by Vee Limited. The railway is the brainchild of Andrew John Higgins

== Education ==
There have been three schools in High Legh. The one within the triangle on the side of the A50 is now High Legh Village Hall, managed by High Legh Community Association. The latest school (with new extensions 1993–94) was built on Wrenshot Lane in 1976; the land was donated by Charles Cornwall-Legh (later Lord Grey of Codnor) to Cheshire County Council.

== Sport ==
The village now has several sporting facilities including High Legh Cricket Club which plays at Arley Hall, the home of the Viscount Ashbrook, golf at High Legh Park Country Club on land formerly part of the West Hall estate, High Legh Bowling Club, opposite the Village Hall and High Legh Tennis Club. In 2008 an annual early season 10K running race was started, called the High Legh Robert Moffat Memorial 10K race. It has developed into a very popular local race. The race is jointly organised by High Legh Community Association and Lymm Runners Running Club

== See also ==
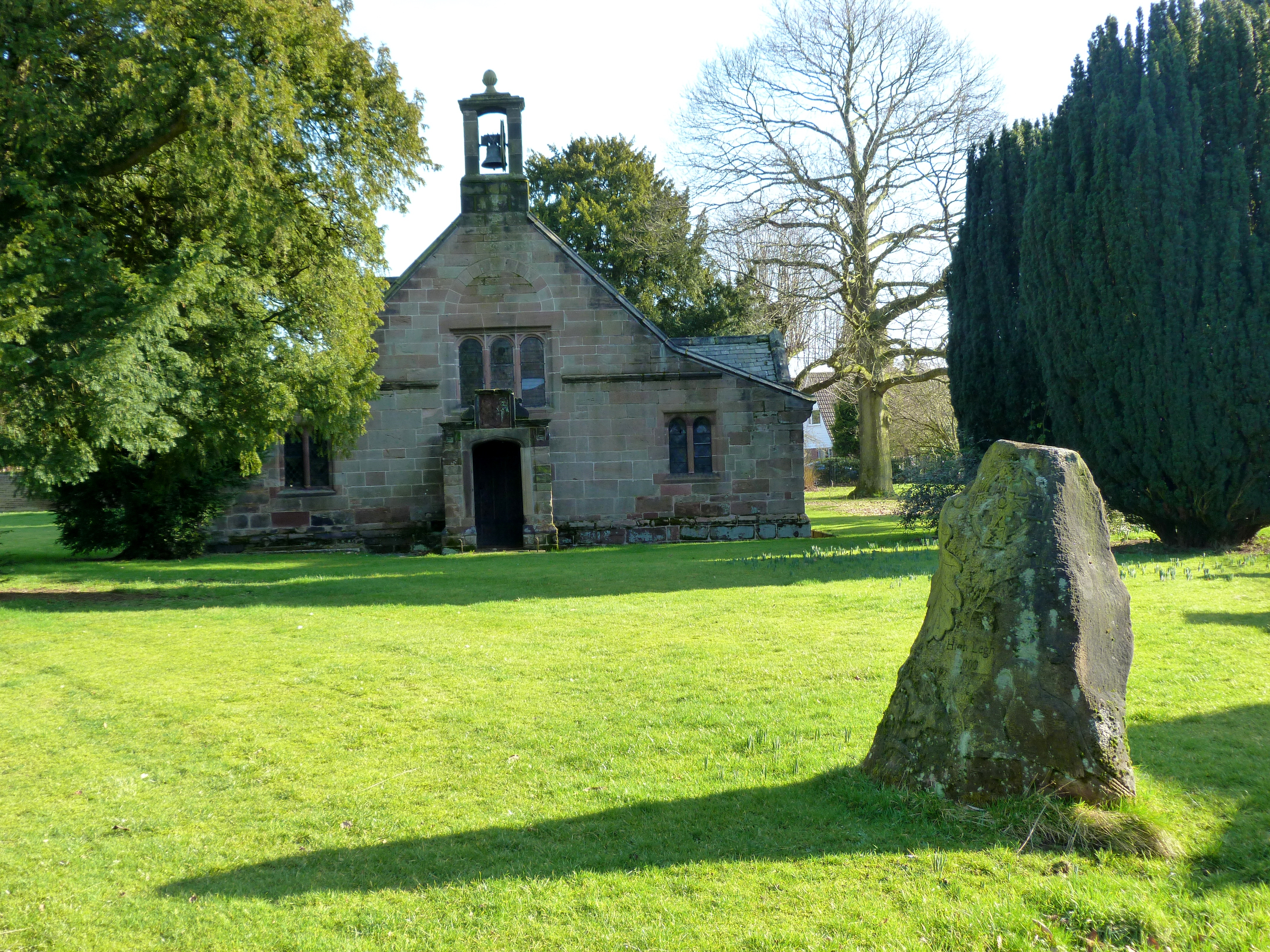
The oldest building in the parish of High Legh is St Mary's Chapel.

- Listed buildings in High Legh
- Murder of Jacqueline Ansell-Lamb, unsolved killing that took place in High Legh in 1970
