= Piers Egerton-Warburton =

English politician

Piers Egerton-Warburton JP
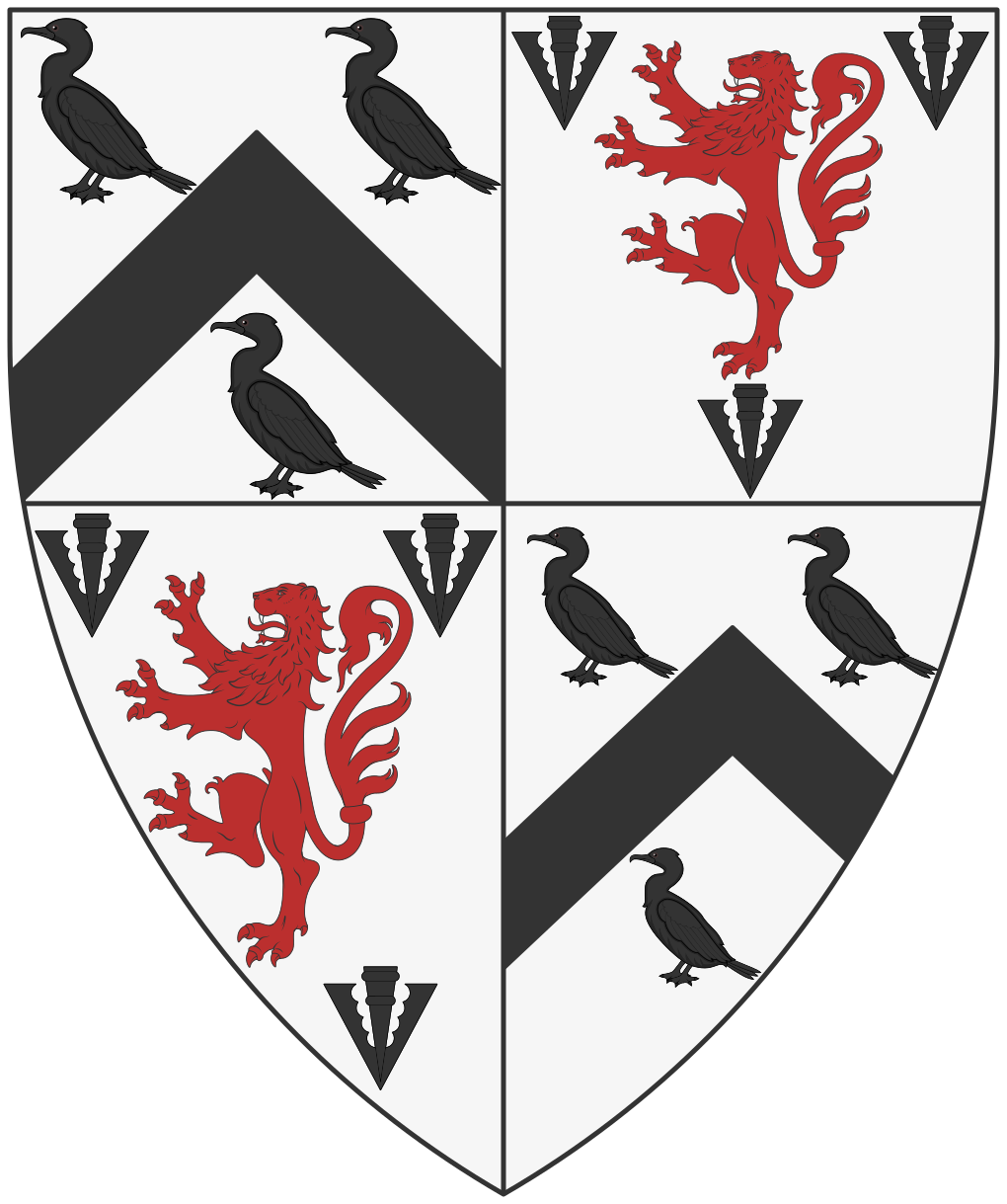
- Born: 22 May 1839; Norley Bank, Cheshire, England
- Died: 24 March 1914 (aged 74); Arley Hall, Cheshire, England
- Education: Eton College; Christ Church, Oxford (BA)
- Spouse: Hon. Antoinette Saumarez
- Children: 6
- Relatives: Grey Egerton baronets

Piers Egerton-Warburton JP (22 May 1839 – 24 March 1914) was an English landowner and Conservative politician who sat in the House of Commons from 1876 to 1885.

Egerton-Warburton was the eldest son of Rowland Eyles Egerton and his wife, Mary Brooke, daughter of Sir Richard Brooke, 6th Baronet. His father assumed by Royal Licence the additional surname and arms of Warburton on inheriting estates of his great uncle Sir Peter Warburton.

Egerton-Warburton was educated at Eton College before going up to Christ Church, Oxford (BA 1861). He served as a Captain in the Earl of Chester's Yeomanry Cavalry and as a Magistrate for Cheshire.

In 1876 Egerton-Warburton was elected Member of Parliament for Mid Cheshire, holding the seat until 1885.

== Personal life ==
Egerton-Warburton married the Hon. Antoinette Elizabeth Saumarez, daughter of John Saumarez, 3rd Baron de Saumarez in 1880. They had two sons and four daughters:

- Dorothy Egerton-Warburton (27 July 1882 – 5 November 1954), died unmarried
- Eveline Egerton-Warburton ( – 23 November 1967), married in 1940, Bishop Mark Carpenter-Garnier
- Captain John Egerton-Warburton (13 December 1883 – 30 August 1915), married the Hon. Lettice Legh, daughter of 2nd Baron Newton and died wounded on active service in First World War
- Colonel Geoffrey Egerton-Warburton DSO TD JP (18 February 1888 – 1 August 1961), married Hon. Georgiana Mary Dormer MBE, daughter of the 14th Baron Dormer; father of Peter Egerton-Warburton
- Margery Antoinette Egerton-Warburton (17 November 1890 – 15 July 1963), died unmarried
- Lettice Egerton-Warburton (22 July 1894 – 27 July 1983), died unmarried.

Egerton-Warburton lived at Arley Hall near Northwich, where he died at the age of 74.

Parliament of the United Kingdom
Preceded by Egerton Leigh; Wilbraham Egerton	Member of Parliament for Mid Cheshire; 1876 – 1885; With: Wilbraham Egerton to 1883; Alan Egerton from 1883	constituency abolished
