= 1873 Mid Cheshire by-election =

UK Parliamentary by-election

The 1873 Mid Cheshire by-election was contested on 7 March 1873, due to the resignation of the incumbent Conservative MP, George Legh. It was won by the Conservative candidate Egerton Leigh.

Mid Cheshire by-election, 1873
Party	Candidate	Votes	%	±%
Conservative	Egerton Leigh	3,508	62.3	−9.1
Liberal	George William Latham	2,118	37.6	+9.0
Majority		1,390	24.7	+17.8
Turnout		5,626	72.1	−4.9
Conservative hold		Swing	-9.0	
