= North Cheshire =

Parliamentary constituency in the United Kingdom, 1832–1868

- Former county constituency for the House of Commons
- Context: 1832-1868. Extract from 1837 result: the southern striped area inland of the broad Mersey estuary, wholly shown.

1832–1868
- Seats: 2
- Created from: Cheshire
- Replaced by: East Cheshire; Mid Cheshire; Stalybridge

North Cheshire is a former United Kingdom parliamentary constituency. It was created upon the division of Cheshire in 1832. In 1868 it was abolished with South Cheshire to form East Cheshire, Mid Cheshire, West Cheshire and Stalybridge.

== History ==
North Cheshire, or the Northern Division of Cheshire, was created as a two-member constituency under the Representation of the People Act 1832 as one of two divisions, along with South Cheshire, of the Parliamentary County of Cheshire. It comprised the Hundreds of Macclesfield and Bucklow.

Under the Reform Act 1867, Cheshire was further divided with the creation of Mid Cheshire, to which the Bucklow Hundred was transferred. North Cheshire, now comprising the Hundred of Macclesfield was renamed East Cheshire by the Boundaries Act 1868.

== Members of Parliament ==
Election	First member	First party	Second member	Second Party
1832	Hon. Edward Stanley	Whig	William Egerton	Conservative
1841	George Legh	Conservative	William Egerton	Conservative
1847	Hon. Edward Stanley	Whig	William Egerton	Conservative
1848 by-election	George Legh	Conservative	William Egerton	Conservative
1858 by-election	George Legh	Conservative	Hon. Wilbraham Egerton	Conservative
1868	Second Reform Act: constituency abolished			

== Elections ==
General election 1865: Cheshire Northern (2 seats)
Party	Candidate	Votes	%	±%
Conservative	Wilbraham Egerton	Unopposed		
Conservative	George Legh	Unopposed		
Registered electors		6,026		
Conservative hold				
Conservative hold				

General election 1859: Cheshire Northern (2 seats)
Party	Candidate	Votes	%	±%
Conservative	Wilbraham Egerton	Unopposed		
Conservative	George Legh	Unopposed		
Registered electors		6,504		
Conservative hold				
Conservative hold				

By-election, 7 August 1858: Cheshire Northern
Party	Candidate	Votes	%	±%
Conservative	Wilbraham Egerton	Unopposed		
Conservative hold				

- Caused by Egerton's resignation by accepting the office of Steward of the Manor of Northstead

General election 1857: Cheshire Northern (2 seats)
Party	Candidate	Votes	%	±%
Conservative	William Egerton	Unopposed		
Conservative	George Legh	Unopposed		
Registered electors		6,693		
Conservative hold				
Conservative hold				

General election 1852: Cheshire Northern (2 seats)
Party	Candidate	Votes	%	±%
Conservative	William Egerton	Unopposed		
Conservative	George Legh	Unopposed		
Registered electors		7,494		
Conservative hold				
Conservative gain from Whig				

By-election, 8 June 1848: Cheshire Northern
Party	Candidate	Votes	%	±%
Conservative	George Legh	3,060	55.8	N/A
Whig	Francis Dukinfield Palmer-Astley	2,419	44.2	N/A
Majority		641	11.6	N/A
Turnout		5,479	76.2	N/A
Registered electors		7,188		
Conservative gain from Whig		Swing	N/A	

- Caused by elevation of Edward Stanley to the House of Lords as Lord Eddisbury

General election 1847: Cheshire Northern (2 seats)
Party	Candidate	Votes	%	±%
Conservative	William Egerton	Unopposed		
Whig	Edward Stanley	Unopposed		
Registered electors		7,188		
Conservative hold				
Whig gain from Conservative				

General election 1841: Cheshire Northern (2 seats)
Party	Candidate	Votes	%	±%
Conservative	William Egerton	2,782	36.4	N/A
Conservative	George Legh	2,652	34.7	N/A
Whig	Edward Stanley	2,206	28.9	N/A
Majority		446	5.8	N/A
Turnout		4,923 (est)	80.0 (est)	N/A
Registered electors		6,154		
Conservative hold				
Conservative gain from Whig				

General election 1837: Cheshire Northern (2 seats)
Party	Candidate	Votes	%
Conservative	William Egerton	Unopposed	
Whig	Edward Stanley	Unopposed	
Registered electors		6,029	
Conservative hold			
Whig hold			

General election 1835: Cheshire Northern (2 seats)
Party	Candidate	Votes	%
Conservative	William Egerton	Unopposed	
Whig	Edward Stanley	Unopposed	
Registered electors		5,045	
Conservative hold			
Whig hold			

General election 1832: Cheshire Northern (2 seats)
Party	Candidate	Votes	%
Whig	Edward Stanley	2,556	39.3
Tory	William Egerton	2,428	37.4
Whig	John Richard Delap Tollemache	1,516	23.3
Turnout		4,346	85.1
Registered electors		5,105	
Majority		128	1.9
Whig win (new seat)			
Majority		912	14.1
Whig win (new seat)			

== See also ==
- List of former United Kingdom Parliament constituencies
- History of parliamentary constituencies and boundaries in Cheshire
