= Andrew Cooper (Labour politician) =

British politician

Andrew Cooper MP
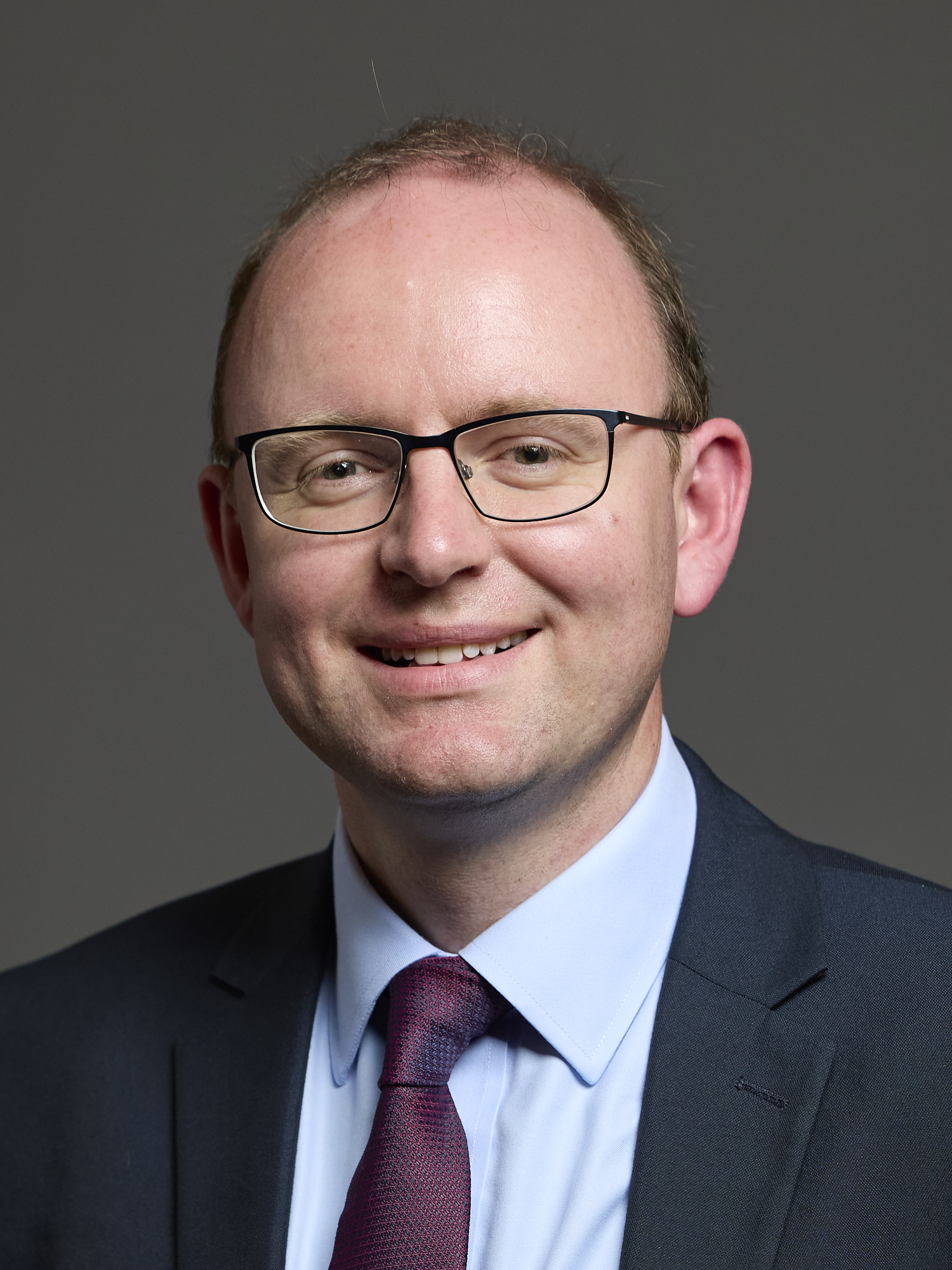
- Official portrait, 2024

Member of Parliament for Mid Cheshire
- Incumbent
- Assumed office 4 July 2024
- Preceded by: Constituency established
- Majority: 8,927 (21.4%)

Member of Cheshire West and Chester Council for Northwich Leftwich
- In office 2 May 2019 – June 2024
- Preceded by: Ward established
- Succeeded by: Rachel Waterman

Personal details
- Born: Andrew Graham Cooper; February 1984 (age 42)
- Party: Labour
- Education: University of Manchester (BSc)
- Website: www.andrewcooper.net

Andrew Graham Cooper (born 1984) is a British Labour Party politician who has been Member of Parliament (MP) for Mid Cheshire since the 2024 United Kingdom general election. He previously served as a councillor for Northwich Town Council and Cheshire West and Chester Council.

== Education ==
Cooper was educated at the University of Manchester where he graduated with a Bachelor of Science degree in Computer Science from the Department of Computer Science in 2005.

== Career ==
Before being elected an MP, Cooper was employed as a software development director at MIS Active Management Systems Limited, a provider of cloud computing software to housing providers.

In November 2024, Cooper voted in favour of the Terminally Ill Adults (End of Life) Bill, which proposes to legalise assisted suicide.
