= Listed buildings in High Legh =

High Legh is a civil parish in Cheshire East, England. It contains 12 listed buildings, which are designated by English Heritage and recorded in the National Heritage List for England. Of these, two are listed at Grade II*, the middle grade, and the others are at Grade II. Apart from the village of High Legh, the parish is mainly rural. Most of the listed buildings are houses, cottages, and farmhouses, some of them dating back to the 16th and 17th centuries, and timber-framed. The other listed buildings are a chapel and a church.

== Key ==
Grade	Criteria
II*	Particularly important buildings of more than special interest
II	Buildings of national importance and special interest

== Buildings ==
Name and location	Photograph	Date	Notes	Grade
Swineyard Hall Farmhouse; 53.35024°N 2.48511°W		Late 16th century	The farmhouse was extended in the 19th century. It stands on a partly moated site. The farmhouse is built partly in timber framing and partly in rendered brick, on a plinth of brick and stone. The roof is slated. The house is in two storeys, and has a three-bay front. The left bay is gabled and timber-framed; the middle bay is also gabled, and is in rendered brick; the right bay has a brick lower storey and a timer-framed upper storey. The windows on the front are casements, and on the back they are mullioned or mullioned and transomed.	II*
St Mary's Chapel; 53.35141°N 2.45111°W		c. 1581	The chapel was restored in 1836, in 1858, this time by William Butterfield, and the chancel was added in 1884 by John Oldrid Scott. It is built in stone with a tiled roof, and consists of a nave with aisles, and a chancel. On the west gable is a single bellcote. The architectural style is Perpendicular.	II*
Dairy Farm House; 53.34628°N 2.45466°W	—	Late 16th to early 17th century	The farmhouse is partly timber-framed with rendered infill on a stone plinth, and partly in brick. It has a stone slate roof, is in an H-shaped plan, and has two storeys. The windows are casements.	II
Apple Tree Cottage; 53.34801°N 2.45488°W	—	Mid-17th century	A house, partly in brick, and partly timber-framed with brick infill, and with some tile hanging and a tiled roof. It is in two storeys, and has a two-bay front. There is a central doorway with a canopied porch. The windows are casements, those in the upper storey being in dormers.	II
Lime Tree Farmhouse; 53.36012°N 2.44256°W	—	17th century	A farmhouse that was extended in the 19th century to the left. It is timber-framed with brick infill on a stone plinth and has a slate roof. It is in two storeys, and the original part is in two bays with a central gabled porch. The windows are casements, those in the upper storey being in dormers.	II
Broad Oak Farm; 53.35746°N 2.43762°W	—	Late 17th century	The farmhouse was extended in the early 19th century. It is in brick with stone dressings, and has a roof of slate and stone slate. The original block is in three storeys, and the extension has two storeys. The windows are casements.	II
Cooper's Square; 53.35316°N 2.46798°W	—	Late 17th century	A house that is partly timber-framed and partly in brick with a slate roof. It has two storeys and is in an L-shaped plan. The upper floor windows are in dormers.	II
Legh Cottage; 53.34425°N 2.43258°W	—	Late 17th century	A timber-framed house with brick infill and a slate roof. It was restored and extended in 1884. The house is in two storeys, and has casement windows. The extension incorporated a timber-framed outhouse.	II
Old Farm; 53.36335°N 2.46154°W	—	1694	A timber-framed house with brick infill on a stone plinth and a slate roof. It is in two storeys, and has casement windows, those at the rear being in dormers.	II
West Hall Farmhouse; 53.35259°N 2.45140°W	—	Early 19th century	The former farmhouse is in brick with a slate roof. It is in two storeys with an attic and a cellar, and has a symmetrical three-bay front. Above the door is a fanlight. The windows are casements.	II
Front Lodge; 53.34961°N 2.45298°W	—	1833–34	This was a lodge to West Hall, designed by James Hakewill in Italianate style. It is built in brick with a slate roof, and is in a single storey. On the drive front is a gabled porch and sash windows, and in the road front are semicircular headed casement windows, a pair of them in a projecting bay.	II
St John's Church; 53.35308°N 2.45185°W		1893	The original church on the site was rebuilt in about 1814, and designed by Thomas Harrison. This burnt down in 1891 and was replaced by the present church, which was designed by Edmund Kirby, using the original stone walls as a foundation. It is constructed in brick, stone, and timber framing, and has a tiled roof. The church consists of a narthex with a tower above it, a nave with a porch and a vestry and a chancel. The tower contains a bay window with a gable, a belfry, and a double-pitched roof with a lead spire.	II
Ovenback Cottage; 53.36144°N 2.42765°W		c.1664	A timber-framed cottage with brick infill and a thatched roof on a stone plinth.	II

== See also ==
- Listed buildings in Antrobus
- Listed buildings in Appleton
- Listed buildings in Aston by Budworth
- Listed buildings in Lymm
- Listed buildings in Mere
- Listed buildings in Millington
