= St Mary's Chapel, High Legh =

Coordinates: 53.3514°N 2.4511°W

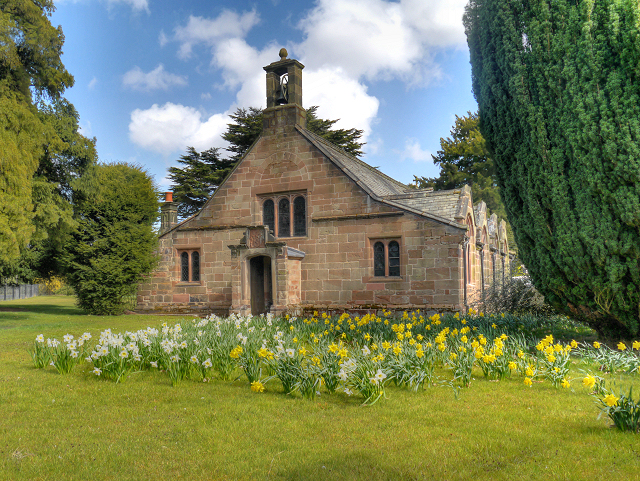

- Location in Cheshire
- OS grid reference: SJ 701 839
- Location: High Legh, Cheshire
- Country: England
- Denomination: Anglican

History
- Status: Former parish church

Architecture
- Heritage designation: Grade II*
- Designated: 5 March 1959
- Architect: John Oldrid Scott
- Architectural type: Church
- Style: Gothic, Gothic Revival
- Completed: 1884

Specifications
- Materials: Ashlar stone with tiled roof

Administration
- Province: York
- Diocese: Chester

St Mary's Chapel is a former Anglican parish church in the village of High Legh, Cheshire, England. It is recorded in the National Heritage List for England as a designated Grade II* listed building.

== History ==
The chapel was built around 1581 as a chapel of ease to High Legh East Hall. High Legh became a separate parish in 1817. The parish was refounded in 1973 with the nearby St John's Church as the parish church. The hall has been demolished. The church was restored in 1836, another restoration was carried out by William Butterfield in 1858, and the chancel, designed by John Oldrid Scott, was added in 1884.

== Architecture ==
=== Exterior ===
The chapel is built in ashlar stone with a tiled roof. Its plan consists of a nave with aisles and a chancel. On the west front is a central porch with pilasters. Above the porch is a three-light Perpendicular window and on each side are two light perpendicular windows. On the gable is a square bell turret with a single bell. On the east front is a four-light 19th-century Perpendicular-style window.

=== Interior ===
The ceiling has 19th-century pargeting with Tudor roses, fleurs de lys and stars. The pews in the nave dated 1858 are by Butterfield and the wainscotting and screens of 1884 by are by J. Oldrid Scott.

== External features ==
To mark the advent of the third millennium a carved stone was erected in the grounds of the chapel.

== See also ==
- Grade II* listed buildings in Cheshire East
- Listed buildings in High Legh
