= St John's Church, High Legh =

Coordinates: 53.3531°N 2.4518°W

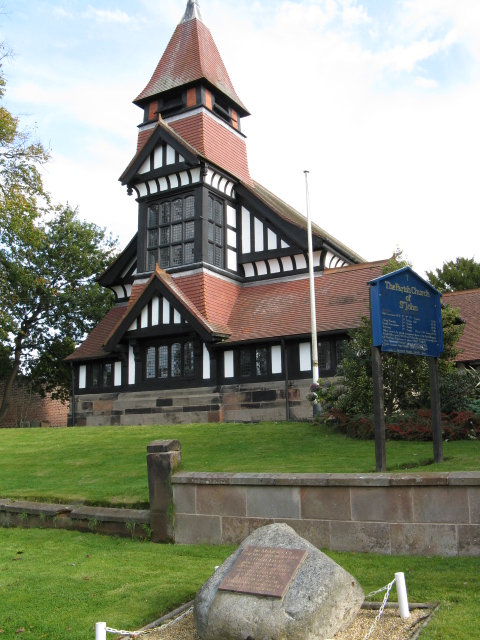
- St John's Church, High Legh

- Location in Cheshire
- OS grid reference: SJ 700 841
- Location: High Legh, Cheshire
- Country: England
- Denomination: Anglican
- Website: http://www.stjohnshighlegh.org/

History
- Status: Parish church
- Founded: (dedicated) 1816

Architecture
- Functional status: Active
- Heritage designation: Grade II
- Designated: 3 September 1984
- Architect: Edmund Kirby
- Architectural type: Church
- Completed: 1893

Specifications
- Materials: Ashlar stone and brick, with cladding of timber framing

Administration
- Province: York
- Diocese: Chester
- Archdeaconry: Macclesfield
- Deanery: Knutsford
- Parish: High Legh

Clergy
- Priest: Clare Leal

St John's Church is an active Anglican parish church in the village of High Legh, Cheshire, England. It is in the deanery of Knutsford, the archdeaconry of Macclesfield and the diocese of Chester.

Its benefice was united with St Paul's Church, Over Tabley until 1 March 2011, each parish now having its own benefice. The church is recorded in the National Heritage List for England as a designated Grade II listed building.

== History ==
Arms of Leigh of West Hall, High Legh

St John's Church was established by the Leigh family of West Hall, as its domestic chapel. Its construction was started in 1814 with an Ionic façade, to a design by Thomas Harrison. The original edifice burnt down in 1891. The remaining stone walls were used as foundations for the new church designed by Edmund Kirby and built in 1893. The roof was re-tiled in 1982. In 2008, a new stained glass window was installed depicting Christ and Fishermen, designed by Roy Coomber and made by Pendle Stained Glass.

== Architecture ==
The church is constructed in ashlar stone and brick, with a tiled roof and on its exterior timber framing with rendered infill; its interior is brick-faced throughout. The church's layout consists of a narthex at the west end (comprising its narthex at ground level and a two-level tower above), a three-bay nave with a south porch and a vestry projecting to the south, and a chancel.

The projecting west front of the narthex has a central window with four casements and a two-light window on each side. Above the window is a timber-framed gable, and the lower stage of the tower contains a bay window with four mullioned and transomed lights on the front and similar two-light windows on the sides. Above the bay window is another timber-framed gable. The top stage consists of a brick belfry with louvred bell openings. At the top of the tower is a double-pitched roof with a lead spire. The south front of the church is clad with close studding and it contains four-light windows with perpendicular-style tracery. The vestry has a half-hipped roof and a six-light casement window. In the chancel is an east window. An extension, in keeping with the design and appearance of the original building, was added to the south side of the vestry in 1993. This was enlarged in 2010 and now includes a parish room, kitchen, toilet and storage facilities.

== See also ==
- Listed buildings in High Legh
- List of works by Edmund Kirby
- St Mary's Chapel, High Legh
