= Egerton Leigh =

British politician

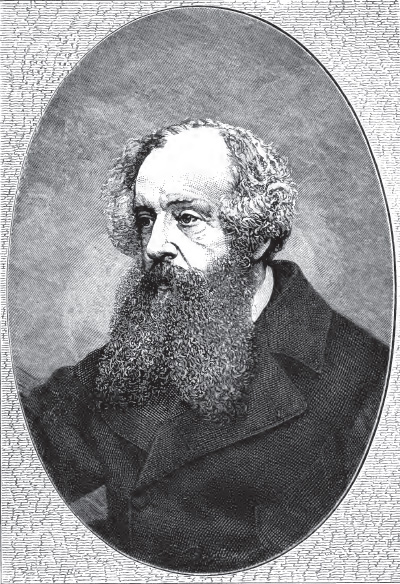
- Colonel Egerton Leigh
- Born: 7 March 1815
- Died: 1 June 1876 (aged 61)
- Military career
- Units: 2nd Dragoon Guards; Cheshire Militia

Egerton Leigh JP DL MP (7 March 1815 – 1 July 1876) was a British Army officer, landowner, antiquary and Conservative politician.

== Personal life ==
Leigh was the only son of Egerton Leigh and Wilhelmina Sarah, daughter of George Stratton, and succeeded his father as head of the ancient Cheshire family of Leigh of West Hall, High Legh; while his Christian name derived from his descent from John Egerton, 2nd Earl of Bridgewater, the Leigh Baronets of South Carolina were a cadet branch of this family. An earlier junior branch of the ancient Leighs became Barons Leigh and Earls of Chichester.

Lord of the manors of High Legh and Twemlow, patron of the benefice of High Legh and of the 1st mediety of Lymm, Leigh married Lydia Rachel, daughter of John Smith Wright, JP in 1842. They had several children, the eldest of whom was Captain Egerton Leigh (who married first Lady Elizabeth Gore White; who died 1880) and great-grandfather of the Conservative politician Sir Edward Leigh, MP for Gainsborough (since 1983).

He died on 1 July 1876; his wife survived him by 17 years and died on 3 April 1893.

== Military and political career ==
After leaving Eton, Leigh was commissioned into the British Army as cornet in the Queen's Bays, and went on to serve as a captain in the 2nd Dragoon Guards and a major and brevet lieutenant-colonel in the Cheshire Militia. He was appointed a Justice of the Peace and Deputy Lieutenant for Cheshire, and served as High Sheriff of the county in 1872.

At a by-election in 1873 Leigh was elected to parliament for Mid Cheshire, which seat he represented until his death three years later. He was a staunch Conservative, in favour of the union of Church and State and of economy in public expenditure.

=== Published works ===
Leigh coat of arms

Leigh, an author and antiquary, wrote Ballads & Legends of Cheshire (1867) and A Glossary of Words Used in the Dialect of Cheshire (1877).

== See also ==
- West Hall, High Legh
- High Sheriff of Cheshire

Parliament of the United Kingdom
Preceded by Wilbraham Egerton; George Cornwall Legh	Member of Parliament for Mid Cheshire; 1873–1876; With: Wilbraham Egerton	Succeeded by Wilbraham Egerton; Alan Egerton
