= Cheshire West and Chester Council =

Local authority in Cheshire, England

Type
- Type: Unitary authority

History
- Founded: 1 April 2009

Leadership
- Chair: Rob Bisset, Labour since 18 May 2023
- Leader: Louise Gittins, Labour since 21 May 2019
- Chief Executive: Del Curtis since 2023

Structure
- Seats: 70 councillors
- Graph of the party split among 70 seats.
- Political groups: Administration (35) Labour (35) Other parties (35) Conservative (20) Green (3) Reform (3) Liberal Democrats (1) Independent (8)

Elections
- Last election: 4 May 2023
- Next election: 6 May 2027

Meeting place
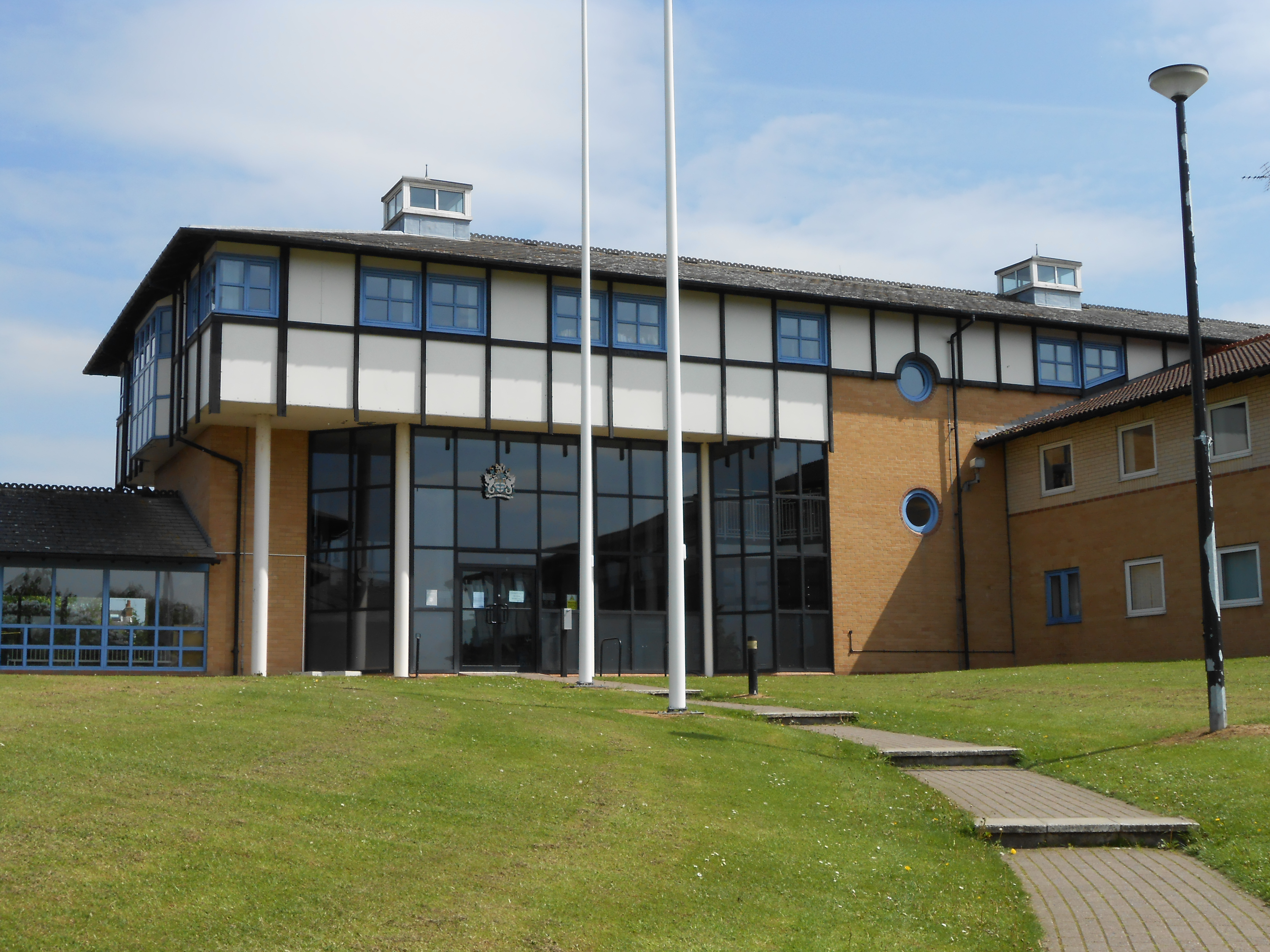
- Wyvern House, The Drumber, Winsford, CW7 1AH

Website
- www.cheshirewestandchester.gov.uk

Cheshire West and Chester Council is the local authority for Cheshire West and Chester, a local government district with borough status in the ceremonial county of Cheshire, England. The council is a unitary authority, being a district council which also performs the functions of a county council. It has been under no overall control since June 2025, being run by a Labour minority administration. Full council meetings are held at Wyvern House in Winsford, and the council's main offices are at The Portal in Ellesmere Port.

In 2026, the council became part of the Cheshire and Warrington Combined Authority.

== History ==
The council and district were created in 2009, covering the combined area of the former districts of Chester, Ellesmere Port and Neston and Vale Royal. The new council also took on the functions of the abolished Cheshire County Council in the area. Cheshire West and Chester is both a non-metropolitan district and a non-metropolitan county, but there is no separate county council; instead the district council performs both district and county functions, making it a unitary authority. For the purposes of lieutenancy and shrievalty, Cheshire West and Chester remains part of the ceremonial county of Cheshire.

The new district was awarded borough status from its creation on 1 April 2009. The council's full legal name is therefore Cheshire West and Chester Borough Council, although it styles itself Cheshire West and Chester Council. As a borough, the chair of the council is allowed to take the title of mayor. Until 2015 the role of chair of the council was combined with the ceremonial position of Lord Mayor of Chester. The roles were then separated, with the chair of the council becoming a separate position but not taking the title of mayor.

In February 2026, the council became part of the Cheshire and Warrington Combined Authority.

== Governance ==
The council provides both district-level and county-level functions. Most of the borough is covered by civil parishes, which form a second tier of local government for their areas. The exceptions are Chester and Ellesmere Port which are unparished, with the Cheshire West and Chester councillors for those areas instead serving as charter trustees.

=== Political control ===
Labour won a majority at the 2023 election. Two Labour councillors subsequently left the party in June 2025, leaving Labour with exactly half the seats, putting the council under no overall control.

The first election to the council was held in 2008, initially acting as a shadow authority alongside the outgoing authorities until it came into its powers on 1 April 2009. Political control of the council since 2009 has been as follows:

Party in control	Years
Conservative	2009–2015
Labour	2015–2019
No overall control	2019–2023
Labour	2023–2025
No overall control	2025–present

=== Leadership ===
The leaders of the council since its creation in 2009 have been:

Councillor	Party	From	To
Mike Jones	Conservative	1 Apr 2009	May 2015
Samantha Dixon	Labour	21 May 2015	May 2019
Louise Gittins	Labour	21 May 2019	

=== Composition ===
Following the 2023 election, and subsequent by-elections and changes of allegiance up to July 2026, the composition of the council was as follows:

Party	Councillor
Labour	35
Conservative	20
Green	3
Reform	3
Liberal Democrats	1
Independent	8
Total	70

Two of the independent councillors sit together as the "Independent Group"; the other six independents do not form part of a group. The next election is due in 2027.

== Premises ==
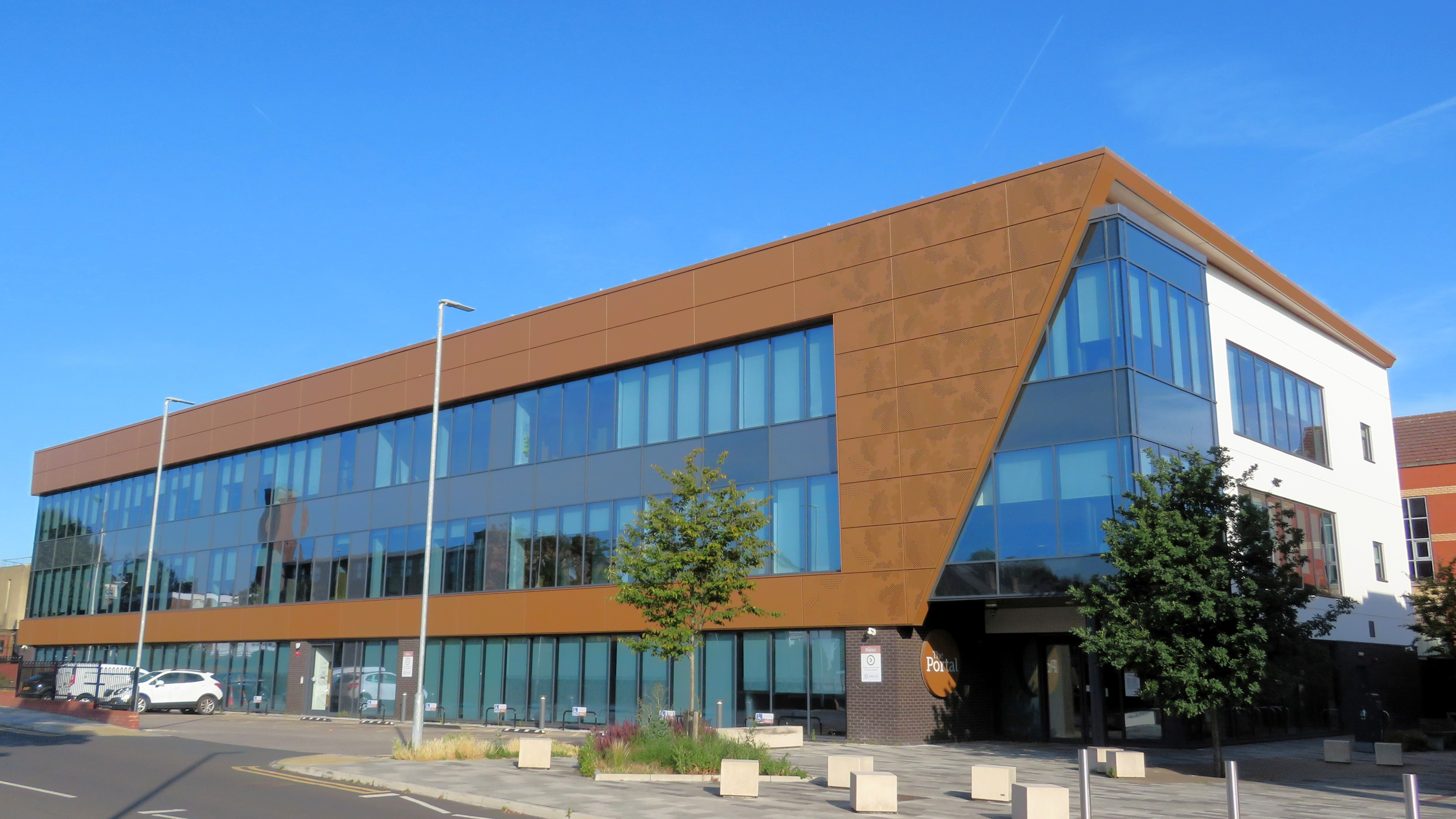
The Portal, Wellington Road, Ellesmere Port, CH65 0BA: Official headquarters of the council, opened 2022

Full council meetings are held at Wyvern House on The Drumber in Winsford. The council's administrative offices and other committee meetings are spread across several buildings. The official registered headquarters office is at The Portal on Wellington Road in Ellesmere Port.

When created in 2009, the council inherited several administrative buildings from its predecessors, notably including Chester Town Hall and the adjoining offices at The Forum from Chester City Council, the Ellesmere Port Council Offices at 4 Civic Way in Ellesmere Port from Ellesmere Port and Neston Borough Council, and Wyvern House on The Drumber in Winsford from Vale Royal Borough Council. The abolished Cheshire County Council's former headquarters at County Hall passed jointly to both Cheshire West and Chester Council and its neighbour Cheshire East Council. County Hall was sold to the University of Chester in 2010, and Cheshire West and Chester Council moved its main offices to a new building called HQ Chester at 58 Nicholas Street in Chester, whilst retaining the other buildings as local offices and additional accommodation.

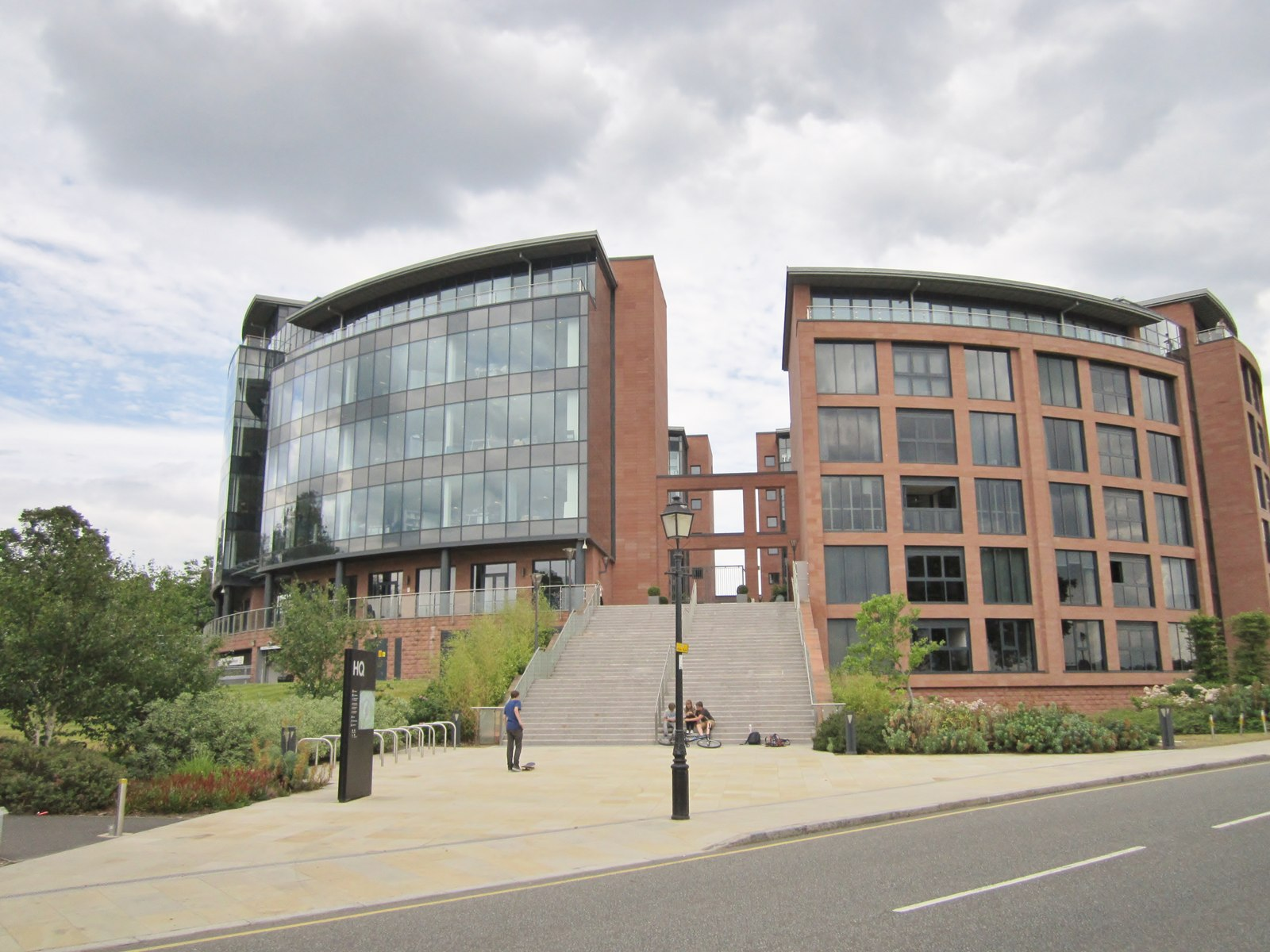
HQ Chester: Council's main offices 2010–2022

The HQ Chester building did not contain a council chamber, and most full council meetings were held at Wyvern House in Winsford, except the annual council meeting which was usually held at Chester Town Hall. Committee meetings were held at various venues. This pattern continued until March 2020 when in-person meetings were suspended due to the COVID-19 pandemic.

In 2022, the council moved its main offices to a new building called The Portal on Wellington Road in Ellesmere Port, and vacated most of the space it had formerly occupied at HQ Chester. Since 2022 full council meetings have been held at Wyvern House.

== Elections ==
Since the last boundary changes in 2019 the council has comprised 70 councillors representing 45 wards, with each ward electing one, two or three councillors. Elections are held every four years.
