= William Egerton, 1st Baron Egerton =

British peer and politician

The Right Honourable The Lord Egerton
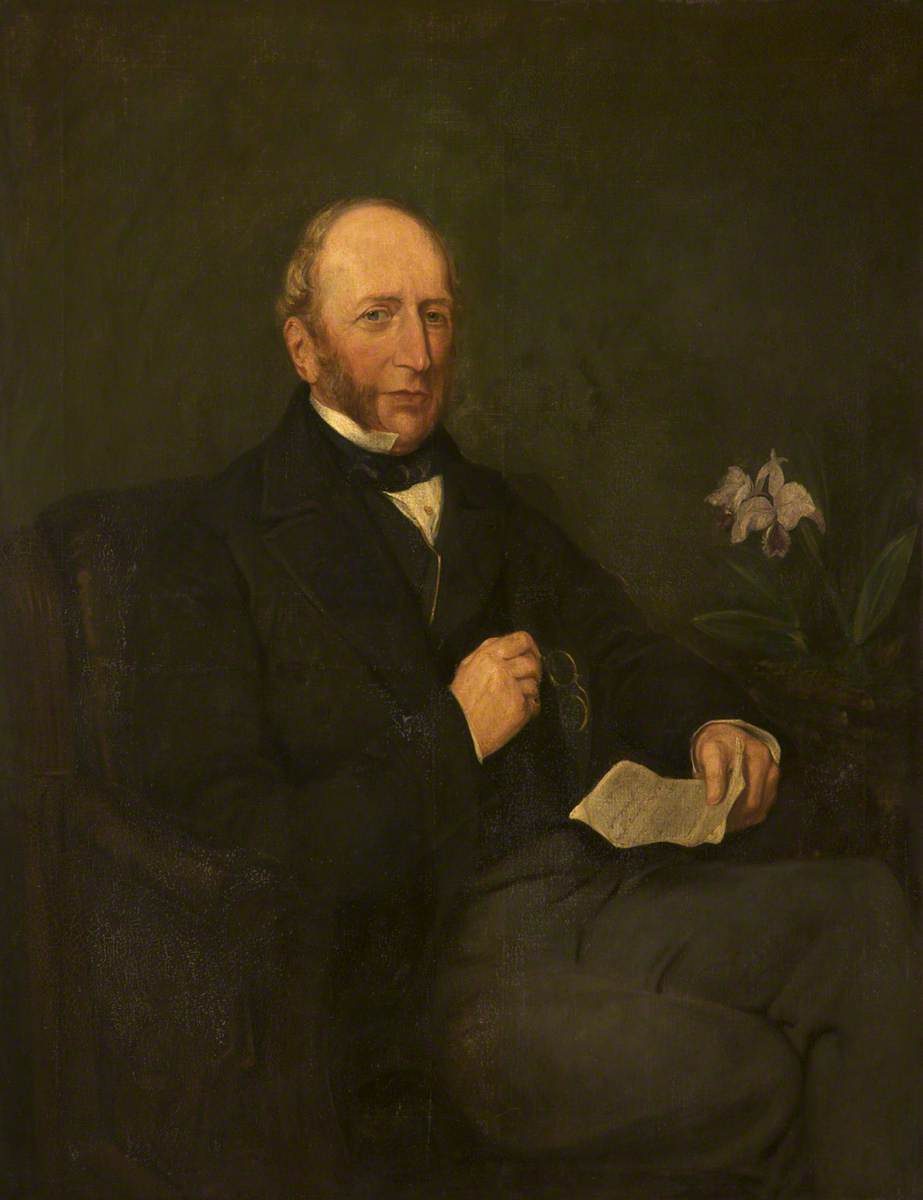

Member of the British Parliament for Lymington
- In office 1830–1831
- Succeeded by: Wilbraham Egerton, 1st Earl Egerton

Member of the British Parliament for Cheshire North
- In office 1832–1858

Baron Egerton
- In office 1859–1883

Personal details
- Born: 30 December 1806
- Died: 21 February 1883
- Spouse: Lady Charlotte Elizabeth Loftus
- Children: 5 (including William, Alan, and Beatrix)

William Tatton Egerton, 1st Baron Egerton (30 December 1806 – 21 February 1883) was a British peer and politician from the Egerton family.

== Biography ==
Egerton was the son of Wilbraham Egerton and his wife Elizabeth, daughter of Sir Christopher Sykes, 2nd Baronet. On his father's side he was descended in the female line from the Hon. Thomas Egerton, of Tatton Park, youngest son of John Egerton, 2nd Earl of Bridgewater. He was educated at Eton College. He was returned to Parliament as one of two representatives for Lymington in 1830, a seat he held until 1831, and then represented Cheshire North from 1832 to 1858. He was a major landowner in the Manchester area and a benefactor to Chorlton-cum-Hardy. In 1859 Egerton was raised to the peerage as Baron Egerton, of Tatton in the County Palatine of Chester. He later served as Lord-Lieutenant of Cheshire from 1868 to 1883.

== Personal life ==
Lord Egerton married Lady Charlotte Elizabeth, daughter of John Loftus, 2nd Marquess of Ely, on 18 December 1830.

They had five children:

- Wilbraham Egerton, 1st Earl Egerton
- Alan Egerton, 3rd Baron Egerton
- Beatrix Lucia (b. 1926), m. Lionel Tollemache (1838–1919), son of John Tollemache, 1st Baron Tollemache.
- Emily Marion (b. 1918), m. Percy Mitford (1833–1884)
- Alice Mary (b. 1868), m. Reginald Cholmondeley

Lady Charlotte died in 1878. Egerton survived her by five years and died in February 1883, aged 76. He was succeeded in the barony by his eldest son Wilbraham, who was created Earl Egerton in 1897.

== Notes ==
Parliament of the United Kingdom
| Preceded by Walter Boyd; George Burrard | Member of Parliament for Lymington; 1830–1831; With: George Burrard | Succeeded by George Burrard; William Alexander Mackinnon |
| New constituency | Member of Parliament for Cheshire North; 1832–1858; With: Edward Stanley 1832–41, 1847–48; George Cornwall Legh 1841–47, 1848–58 | Succeeded by George Cornwall Legh; Wilbraham Egerton |
Honorary titles
| Preceded by The Marquess of Westminster | Lord Lieutenant of Cheshire; 1868–1883 | Succeeded by The Duke of Westminster |
Peerage of the United Kingdom
| New creation | Baron Egerton; 1859–1883 | Succeeded by Wilbraham Egerton |
