= Alan Egerton, 3rd Baron Egerton =

British politician

The Honourable Alan Egerton, 3rd Baron Egerton
- Egerton in 1895
- Born: 19 March 1845
- Died: 9 September 1920 (aged 75)
- Noble family: Egerton; Wilbraham Egerton, 1st Earl Egerton (brother); Beatrix Lucia Catherine Tollemache (sister)

Alan de Tatton Egerton, 3rd Baron Egerton (19 March 1845 – 9 September 1920), known as the Honourable Alan Egerton from 1859 to 1907, was a British Conservative politician from the Egerton family.

Egerton was a younger son of William Egerton, 1st Baron Egerton, and his wife Lady Charlotte Elizabeth Loftus. Wilbraham Egerton, 1st Earl Egerton, was his elder brother. He was elected to the House of Commons for Cheshire Mid in 1883, a seat he held until 1885, when the constituency was abolished, and then represented Knutsford from 1885 to 1906. In 1907 he succeeded his elder brother as third Baron Egerton.

The Hon Alan de Tatton Egerton MP was commissioned as a captain in the Paddington Rifles (later 5th Volunteer Battalion, Rifle Brigade) in 1877, and was later major and honorary lieutenant-colonel in the Cheshire imperial Yeomanry. He was the first president of the Institute of Refrigeration, formed in 1899 as the Cold Storage and Ice Association. He was appointed a deputy lieutenant of the County of Chester 24 December 1901, and Vice-Lieutenant of the county 11 January 1902.

He was a Freemason, the Provincial Grand Master of Cheshire.

Lord Egerton married Anna Louisa, daughter of Simon Watson Taylor, in 1867. He died in September 1920, aged 75, and was succeeded in the barony by his son Maurice.

Parliament of the United Kingdom
Preceded by Wilbraham Egerton; Piers Egerton-Warburton	Member of Parliament for Mid Cheshire; 1883–1885; With: Piers Egerton-Warburton	constituency abolished
New constituency	Member of Parliament for Knutsford; 1885–1906	Succeeded by Alfred John King
Peerage of the United Kingdom
Preceded by Wilbraham Egerton	Baron Egerton; 1907–1920	Succeeded by Maurice Egerton
