= George Legh =

British Conservative Member of Parliament

Legh arms

George Cornwall Legh JP DL MP (30 August 1804 – 16 June 1877) was a 19th-century British Conservative Member of Parliament who represented Mid Cheshire.

== Background and education ==
The head of an old Cheshire family, Legh was the eldest son of George John Legh of East Hall, High Legh, and Mary, daughter of John Blackburne. He was educated at Eton College and Christ Church, Oxford.

Legh served as a major in the 2nd Royal Cheshire Militia. He was also a deputy lieutenant and justice of the peace for Cheshire and served as high sheriff of the county in 1838.

== Political career ==
Legh was elected to House of Commons for Cheshire North in 1841, a seat he held until 1847 and again between 1848 and 1868, when it was abolished and he was instead returned for the newly created Mid Cheshire constituency, which he represented until 1873.

== Family ==
Legh married Louisa Charlotte, daughter of Edward Taylor, in 1828. There were no surviving children from their marriage. He died in June 1877, aged 72, and was succeeded in the family estate by descendants of his brother, later Barons Grey of Codnor.

Parliament of the United Kingdom
Preceded by Edward Stanley; William Egerton	Member of Parliament for Cheshire North; 1841–1847; With: William Egerton	Succeeded by William Egerton; Edward Stanley
Preceded by William Egerton; Edward Stanley	Member of Parliament for Cheshire North; 1848–1868; With: William Egerton 1848–1858; Wilbraham Egerton 1858–1868	Constituency abolished
New constituency	Member of Parliament for Mid Cheshire; 1868–1873; With: Wilbraham Egerton	Succeeded by Wilbraham Egerton; Egerton Leigh
