= Beatrix Lucia Catherine Tollemache =

British writer and translator (1840–1926)

The Honourable Beatrix Lucia Catherine Tollemache
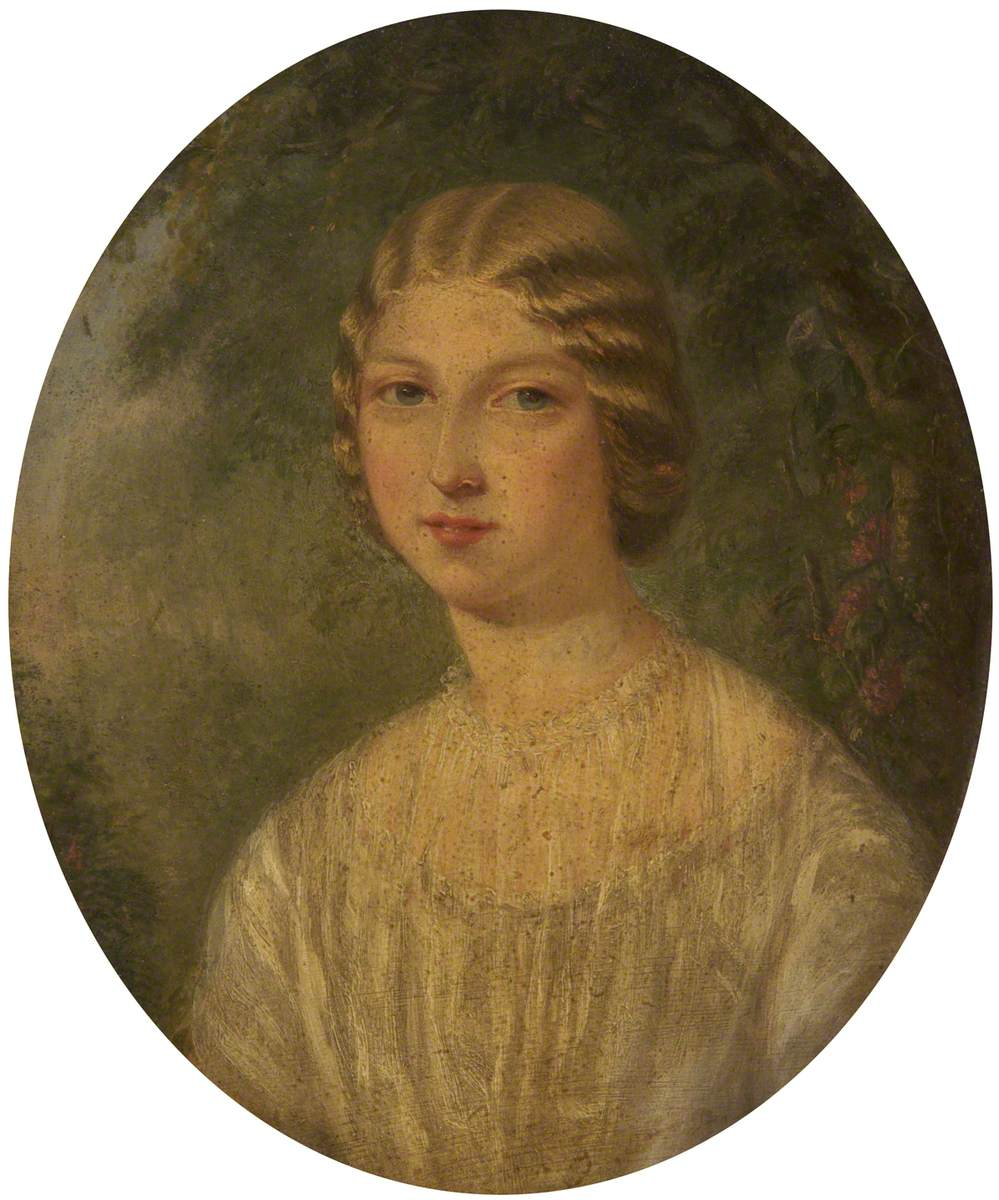
- Tollemache circa 1860
- Born: Beatrix Lucia Catherine Egerton; 8 June 1840; Cheshire, England
- Died: 24 December 1926 (aged 86); Haslemere, Surrey, England
- Occupations: Writer, poet and translator
- Spouse: The Hon. Lionel Arthur Tollemache
- Parent(s): William Egerton, 1st Baron Egerton; Lady Charlotte Elizabeth Loftus
- Relatives: Egerton family (by birth); Tollemache family (by marriage)

Beatrix Lucia Catherine Tollemache (née Egerton, c. 1840 – 24 December 1926) was a British writer, translator and poet. She was the daughter of William Egerton, 1st Baron Egerton of Tatton and Lady Charlotte Elizabeth Loftus.

== Family ==
She was born in 1840 in Cheshire, and was the fourth and youngest daughter of William Egerton, 1st Baron Egerton of Tatton and Lady Charlotte Elizabeth Loftus, daughter of John Loftus, 2nd Marquess of Ely. She had seven siblings, including Wilbraham Egerton, 1st Earl Egerton and Alan Egerton, 3rd Baron Egerton.

On 25 January 1870, she married the Hon. Lionel Arthur Tollemache, son of John Tollemache, 1st Baron Tollemache and Georgiana Louisa Best. They spent much of their married life enjoying long stays in luxury hotels in Europe, such as the Hôtel d'Angleterre in Biarritz, France, and the Hôtel Sonnenberg, Engelberg, Switzerland.

== Career ==
Tollemache developed a career as a writer, with her poems regularly published in The Spectator. She also contributed to the first edition of the Oxford English Dictionary and corresponded with Sir Francis Galton.

In 1890, Tollemache published Engelberg, and Other Verses. In 1891, she published a translation of Jonquille, or the Swiss Smuggler from French, and co-wrote Safe Studies alongside her husband. In 1900, she published Cranford Souvenirs, and Other Sketches.

Tollemache taught herself Russian when she was in her seventies, with her obituary in recording that "the bent of her exceptional mind was shown by her mastery of the difficult Russian language, which she acquired when she was already a septuagenarian." In 1913, she published Russian Sketches, Chiefly of Peasant Life, including her translation The Sealed Angel: Faith, Tradition, and Intrigue in 17th Century Russia by Nikolai Leskov.

== Death ==
Tollemache died in 1926 in Haslemere, Surrey, England.
