= Mid Cheshire =

UK Parliament constituency (1868–1885, 2024 onwards)

- County constituency for the House of Commons
- Interactive map of boundaries since 2024
- Location within North West England
- Electorate: 70,384 (March 2020)
- Major settlements: Northwich, Winsford, and Middlewich

Current constituency
- Created: 2024
- Member of Parliament: Andrew Cooper (Labour)
- Created from: Congleton, Eddisbury & Weaver Vale

1868–1885
- Created from: North Cheshire; South Cheshire
- Replaced by: Altrincham; Hyde; Knutsford; Crewe; Macclesfield; Northwich

Mid Cheshire is a constituency of the House of Commons in the UK Parliament. It is represented by Andrew Cooper of the Labour Party.

It was formerly a two-member United Kingdom parliamentary constituency which existed in the 19th century.

Further to the completion of the 2023 review of Westminster constituencies, it was re-established as a single-member seat and was first contested at the 2024 general election.

== Constituency profile ==
Mid Cheshire is a constituency in Cheshire. It covers the three nearby towns of Northwich, Middlewich and Winsford, as well as the villages of Rudheath, Davenham and Hartford which are contiguous with Northwich.

The three towns have a history of salt mining, an industry that has been present in the area since the Roman era. Much of their housing was built in the 1960s to accommodate overspill from Liverpool and Manchester. Winsford has high levels of deprivation whilst Northwich and Middlewich are more affluent, giving the constituency an average level of wealth overall. House prices are lower than the national average but similar to the rest of North West England.

In general, residents of Mid Cheshire have average levels of education, income and homeownership. Rates of unemployment and child poverty are low, and a high proportion of residents work in the retail and manufacturing sectors. White people made up 96% of the population at the 2021 census.

Employment in the Constituency is supported by large industrial areas such Winsford Industrial Estate & Middlewich Midpoint 18. Mid-Cheshire sits at a strategic point on the motorway network with Easy Access to Manchester, Liverpool, The Midlands & North Wales for access to Ireland via ports at Liverpool & Holyhead.

The Approximate Population of the Constituency is 115,000 based on 2021 Census results. Current Projections from Cheshire West & Cheshire East councils anticipate this to be round 120,000 in 2025.

At the local council level, the three towns are mostly represented by Labour Party councillors with some independents in Winsford and Middlewich. The villages surrounding Northwich elected Conservatives. An estimated 55% of voters in Mid Cheshire supported leaving the European Union in the 2016 referendum, marginally higher than the nationwide figure of 52%.

== History (1868-1885) ==
Under the Reform Act 1867, the Parliamentary County of Cheshire was divided into three 2-member constituencies, namely the Eastern, Mid and Western Divisions, replacing the two Northern and Southern Divisions. Mid Cheshire comprised the Hundred of Bucklow from North Cheshire and the Hundred of Northwich from South Cheshire.

Under the Redistribution of Seats Act 1885, the three 2-member seats were abolished and re-divided into eight single-member constituencies: Altrincham, Crewe, Eddisbury, Hyde, Knutsford, Macclesfield, Northwich and Wirral.

== Boundaries ==
=== 1868–1885 ===
- The Hundreds of Bucklow and Northwich.

=== Current ===
The re-established constituency is composed of the following (as they existed on 1 December 2020):

- The Borough of Cheshire East ward of Middlewich.
- The Borough of Cheshire West and Chester wards of: Davenham, Moulton & Kingsmead; Hartford & Greenbank; Northwich Leftwich; Northwich Winnington & Castle; Northwich Witton; Rudheath; Winsford Dene; Winsford Gravel; Winsford Over & Verdin; Winsford Swanlow; Winsford Wharton.

The seat comprises the following mid Cheshire towns, together with surrounding villages and rural areas:

- Middlewich, transferred from Congleton;
- Northwich, transferred from Weaver Vale (abolished, with majority of electorate being included in the new constituency of Runcorn and Helsby); and
- Winsford, transferred from Eddisbury (renamed Chester South and Eddisbury).

== Members of Parliament ==
From 1868 until the constituency was abolished in 1885, Mid Cheshire was represented by two members of parliament.

Election	First member	First party	Second member	Second Party
1868	Hon. Wilbraham Egerton	Conservative	George Legh	Conservative
1873 by-election	Hon. Wilbraham Egerton	Conservative	Egerton Leigh	Conservative
1876 by-election	Hon. Wilbraham Egerton	Conservative	Piers Egerton-Warburton	Conservative
1883 by-election	Hon. Alan Egerton	Conservative	Piers Egerton-Warburton	Conservative
1885	Constituency abolished			

In 2024, Mid Cheshire was re-established as a constituency and elects one MP.

Election	Member	Party
2024	Andrew Cooper	Labour

== Elections ==
=== Elections in the 2020s ===
General election 2024: Mid Cheshire
Party	Candidate	Votes	%	±%
Labour	Andrew Cooper	18,457	44.5	+2.9
Conservative	Charles Fifield	9,530	23.0	−23.9
Reform	Emma Guy	7,967	19.2	+18.1
Liberal Democrats	Jack Price-Harbach	2,465	5.9	−2.5
Green	Mark Green	1,967	4.7	+2.7
Independent	Helen Clawson	850	2.0	N/A
Independent	Stella Mellor	273	0.7	N/A
Rejected ballots		115		
Majority		8,927	21.5	N/A
Turnout		41,509	59.0	−8.2
Registered electors		70,384		
Labour gain from Conservative		Swing	▲13.4	

Changes are from the notional 2019 results on the 2024 boundaries.

=== Elections in the 2010s ===
2019 notional result
Party	Vote	%
Conservative	22,022	46.9
Labour	19,528	41.6
Liberal Democrats	3,934	8.4
Green	921	2.0
Brexit Party	502	1.1
Turnout	46,907	67.2
Electorate	69,775	

== Election results 1868–1883 ==
=== Elections in the 1880s ===
By-election, 16 Mar 1883: Mid Cheshire
Party	Candidate	Votes	%	±%
Conservative	Alan Egerton	4,214	54.0	+0.6
Liberal	George William Latham	3,592	46.0	−0.7
Majority		622	8.0	+5.7
Turnout		7,806	78.7	−0.5 (est)
Registered electors		9,915		
Conservative hold		Swing	+0.7	

Egerton's elevation to the peerage, becoming Lord Egerton, triggered a by-election.

General election 1880: Mid Cheshire
Party	Candidate	Votes	%	±%
Conservative	Wilbraham Egerton	3,868	27.3	N/A
Conservative	Piers Egerton-Warburton	3,700	26.1	N/A
Liberal	George William Latham	3,374	23.8	New
Liberal	Vernon Armitage	3,247	22.9	New
Majority		326	2.3	N/A
Turnout		7,095 (est)	79.2 (est)	N/A
Registered electors		8,963		
Conservative hold		Swing	N/A	
Conservative hold		Swing	N/A	

=== Elections in the 1870s ===
By-election, 18 July 1876: Mid Cheshire
Party	Candidate	Votes	%	±%
Conservative	Piers Egerton-Warburton	Unopposed		
Registered electors		8,050		
Conservative hold				

Leigh's death triggered a by-election.

General election 1874: Mid Cheshire
Party	Candidate	Votes	%	±%
Conservative	Wilbraham Egerton	Unopposed		
Conservative	Egerton Leigh	Unopposed		
Registered electors		8,050		
Conservative hold				
Conservative hold				

By-election, 10 Mar 1873: Mid Cheshire
Party	Candidate	Votes	%	±%
Conservative	Egerton Leigh	3,508	62.4	−9.0
Liberal	George William Latham	2,118	37.6	+9.0
Majority		1,390	24.8	+17.9
Turnout		5,626	72.1	−4.9
Registered electors		7,801		
Conservative hold		Swing	−9.0	

Legh resigned, triggering a by-election.

=== Elections in the 1860s ===
General election 1868: Mid Cheshire
Party	Candidate	Votes	%	±%
Conservative	Wilbraham Egerton	3,063	35.7	
Conservative	George Legh	3,056	35.7	
Liberal	John Warren	2,452	28.6	
Majority		604	6.9	
Turnout		5,512 (est)	77.0 (est)	
Registered electors		7,158		
Conservative win (new seat)				
Conservative win (new seat)				

== See also ==
- List of former United Kingdom Parliament constituencies
- History of parliamentary constituencies and boundaries in Cheshire
