= Wilbraham Egerton, 1st Earl Egerton =

British politician (1832–1909)

The Right Honourable The Earl Egerton JP
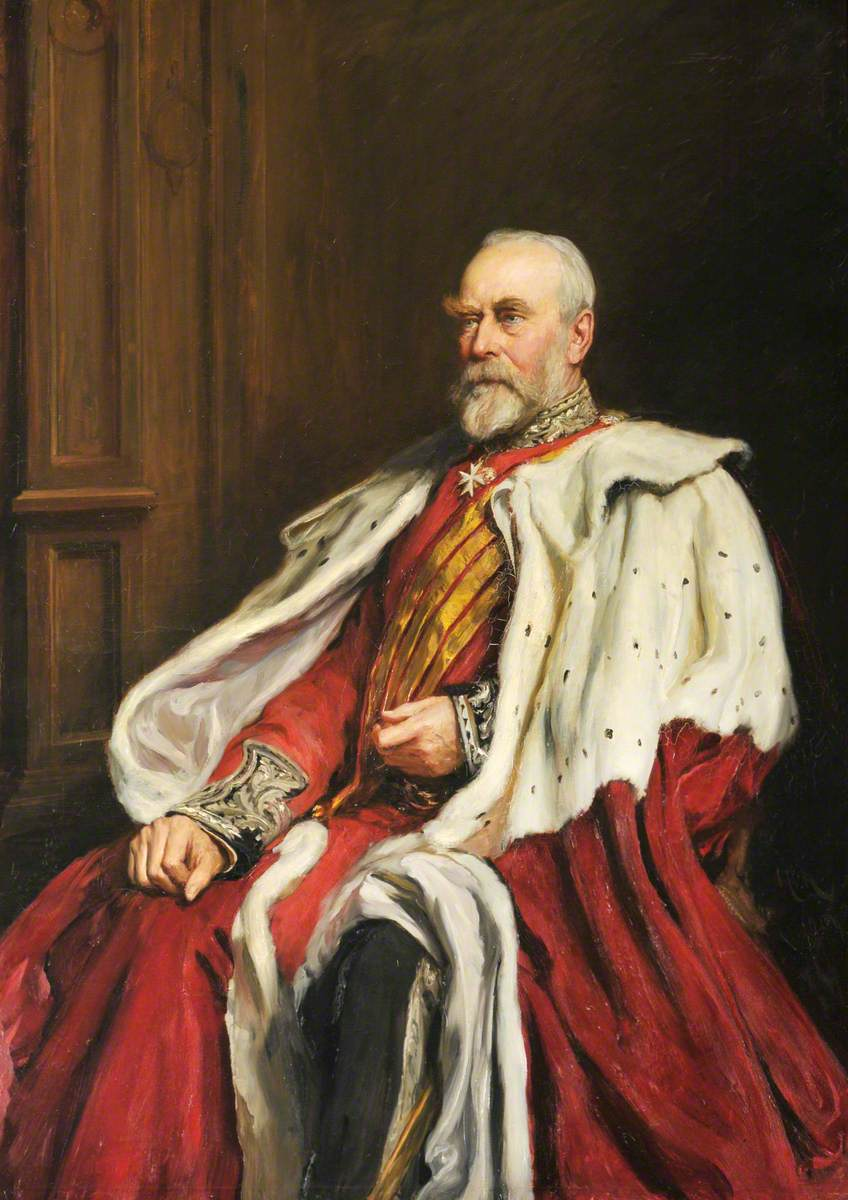
- Wilbraham Egerton, 1st Earl Egerton, by Hubert von Herkomer

Member of Parliament for North Cheshire
- In office 1858–1868 Serving with George Cornwall Legh
- Preceded by: William Egerton; George Cornwall Legh
- Succeeded by: Constituency created

Member of Parliament for Mid Cheshire
- In office 1868–1883 Serving with George Cornwall Legh; Egerton Legh; Piers Egerton-Warburton
- Preceded by: William Egerton; George Cornwall Legh
- Succeeded by: Piers Egerton-Warburton; Hon. Alan Egerton

Personal details
- Born: Wilbraham Egerton; 17 January 1832 United Kingdom
- Died: 16 March 1909 (aged 77) United Kingdom
- Party: Conservative
- Relations: Alan Egerton, 3rd Baron Egerton (brother); Beatrix Lucia Catherine Tollemache (sister)
- Children: Lady Gertrude Lucia Egerton
- Parent(s): William Egerton, 1st Baron Egerton; Lady Charlotte Loftus
- Education: Eton College; Christ Church, Oxford

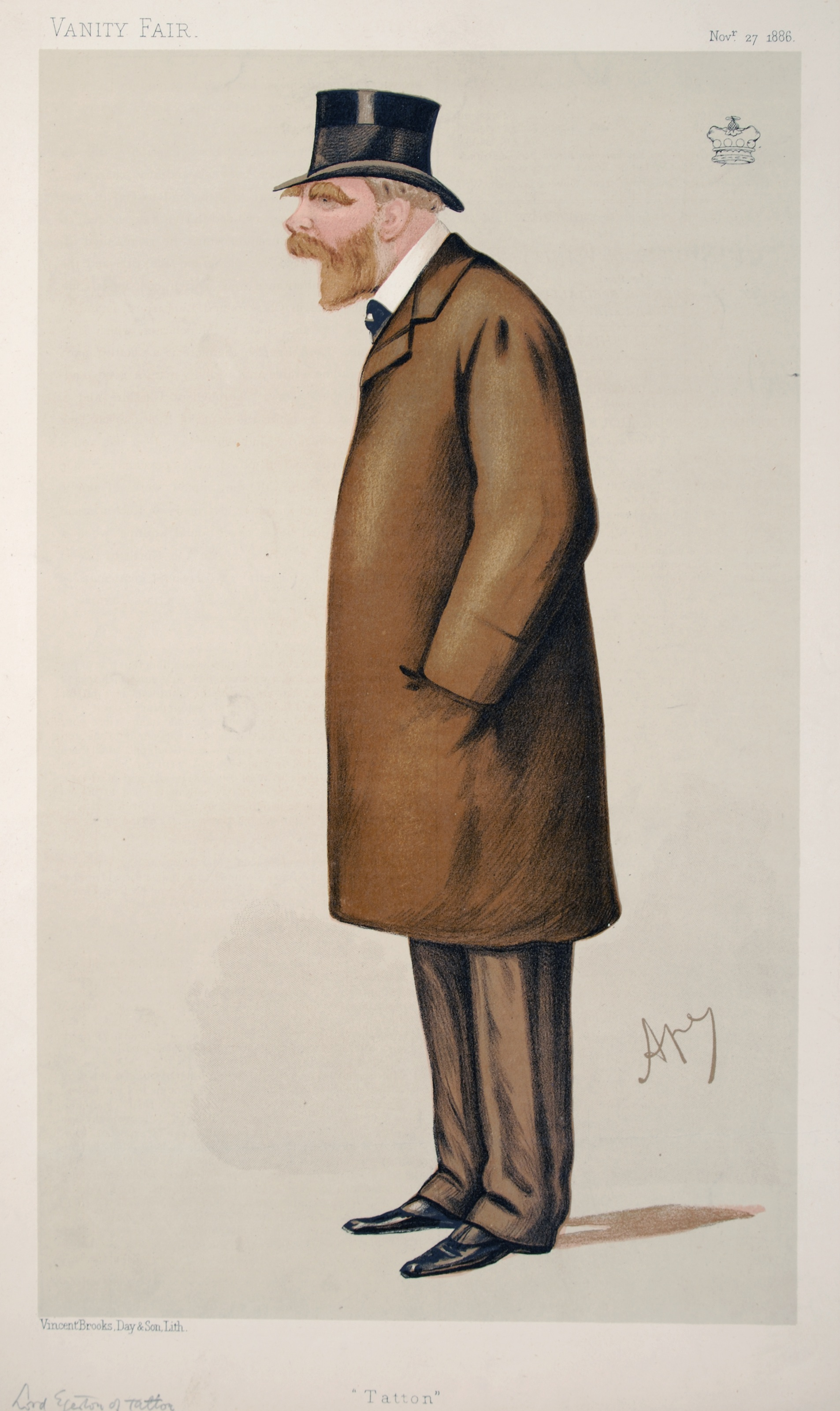
Caricature by Ape published in Vanity Fair in 1886.

Wilbraham Egerton, 1st Earl Egerton (17 January 1832 – 16 March 1909) was an English Conservative Party politician from the Egerton family. He sat in the House of Commons from 1858 to 1883 when he inherited his peerage and was elevated to the House of Lords.

== Life ==
Egerton was the son of the 1st Baron Egerton and his wife Lady Charlotte Loftus eldest daughter of the Marquis of Ely. He was educated at Eton College and Christ Church, Oxford. He was a Justice of the Peace for Cheshire and a captain in the Earl of Chester's Yeomanry Cavalry.

In 1858 Egerton was elected Member of Parliament for North Cheshire and held the seat until it was reorganised in 1868. He was then elected MP for Mid Cheshire and held the seat until 1883, when he succeeded his father as 2nd Baron Egerton. He was the second Chairman of the Manchester Ship Canal from 1887 to 1894. In 1897, he was created Earl Egerton.

Egerton was appointed Lieutenant and Custos Rotulorum (Lord Lieutenant) of Cheshire in March 1900, serving until 1905.

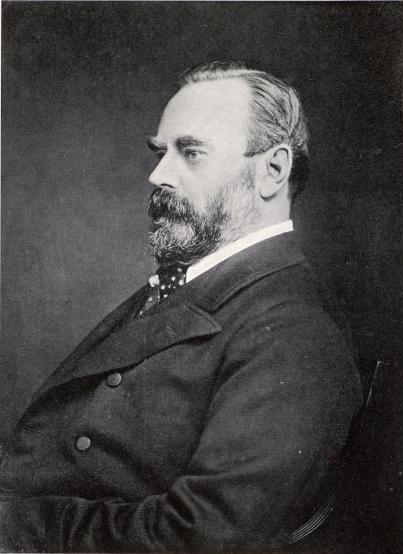
Egerton in 1907, by Franz Baum

Egerton was chairman of the Church Defence Institution, and an Ecclesiastical Commissioner. He died on 16 March 1909 at the age of 77. A bust of Egerton by Kathleen Shaw is on display at Tatton Park.

== Family ==
Egerton married on 15 October 1857 Lady Mary Amherst, the only daughter of the 2nd Earl Amherst. They had one child, Lady Gertrude Lucia Egerton, who later married the future 8th Earl of Albemarle. His first wife died in 1892 and on 8 August 1894, Lord Egerton married Alice Temple-Nugent-Brydges-Chandos-Grenville, the widow of the 3rd Duke of Buckingham and Chandos.

Parliament of the United Kingdom
Preceded by William Egerton; George Cornwall Legh	Member of Parliament for North Cheshire; 1858–1868; With: George Cornwall Legh	Constituency abolished
New constituency	Member of Parliament for Mid Cheshire; 1868–1883; With: George Cornwall Legh 1868–1873; Egerton Legh 1873–1876; Piers Egerton-Warburton 1876–1883	Succeeded by Piers Egerton-Warburton; Hon. Alan Egerton
Honorary titles
Preceded by The Duke of Westminster	Lord Lieutenant of Cheshire; 1900–1905	Succeeded by The Duke of Westminster
Peerage of the United Kingdom
New creation	Earl Egerton; 1897–1909	Extinct
Preceded by William Egerton	Baron Egerton; 1883–1909	Succeeded by Alan Egerton
Professional and academic associations
Preceded by William Boyd Dawkins	President of the Lancashire and Cheshire Antiquarian Society; 1885–86	Succeeded by The Earl of Crawford
