= Cheshire West and Chester Council elections =

Local government elections in Cheshire, England

Cheshire West and Chester Council elections are held every four years. Cheshire West and Chester Council is the local authority for the unitary authority of Cheshire West and Chester in Cheshire, England. Since the last boundary changes in 2019, 70 councillors have been elected from 45 wards.

== Summary results ==
Council seats since 2008
Election	Conservative	Independent	Green	Labour	Liberal Democrats	Unaligned Independent	Winsford Salt of the Earth	Total
2008	55	0	0	13	4	0	0	72
2011	42	0	0	32	1	0	0	75
2015	36	1	0	38	0	0	0	75
2019	28	4	1	35	2	0	0	70
2023	23	5	2	39	1	0	0	70
Current	23	2	2	37	1	3	2	70

== Council elections ==
- 2008 Cheshire West and Chester Council election
- 2011 Cheshire West and Chester Council election (new ward boundaries)
- 2015 Cheshire West and Chester Council election
- 2019 Cheshire West and Chester Council election (new ward boundaries)
- 2023 Cheshire West and Chester Council election

== Results maps ==
2008 results map

2011 results map

2015 results map

2019 results map

2023 results map

== By-election results ==
=== 2011-2015 ===
Ellesmere Port Town by-election, 20 October 2011
Party	Candidate	Votes	%	±%
Labour	Lynn Clare	686	71.6	−
Conservative	Graham Pritchard	102	10.6	
Socialist Labour	Kenny Spain	65	6.8	
UKIP	Andrew Roberts	64	6.8	
Liberal Democrats	Hilary Chrusciezl	41	4.3	
Majority		584	61.0	
Turnout		958	15.3	
Labour hold		Swing		

Boughton by-election, 10 July 2014
Party	Candidate	Votes	%	±%
Labour	Martyn Delaney	614	44.8	−7.3%
Conservative	Kate Vaughan	469	34.2	−6.2%
UKIP	Charles Dodman	131	9.6	+9.6%
Green	John McNamara	86	6.3	+6.3%
Liberal Democrats	Mark Gant	70	5.1	−2.4%
Majority		145	10.6	
Turnout		1,370		
Labour hold		Swing		

Winnington and Castle by-election, 10 July 2014
Party	Candidate	Votes	%	±%
Labour	Sam Naylor	525	39.5	
Conservative	Jim Sinar	418	31.4	
UKIP	Amos Wright	307	23.1	
Liberal Democrats	Alice Chapman	80	6.0	
Majority		107	8.0	
Turnout		1,330		
Labour hold		Swing		

=== 2015-2019 ===
Blacon by-election, 20 April 2017
Party	Candidate	Votes	%	±%
Labour	Ben Powell	1,556	59.1	0%
Conservative	Jack Jackson	574	21.8	+4%
Independent	Steve Ingram	434	16.5	+16.5%
Liberal Democrats	Lizzie Jewkes	70	2.7	+2.7%
Majority		982	37.3	
Turnout		2,634	25.4	−35.8%
Labour hold		Swing		

Ellesmere Port Town by-election, 3 May 2018
Party	Candidate	Votes	%	±%
Labour	Edwardson, Mike	1,447	82.9	
Conservative	Griffiths, Robert Douglas	239	13.7	
Green	Roberts, Matthew Joseph	60	3.4	
Majority		1208	69.2	
Turnout		1746	24.51	
Labour hold		Swing		

=== 2019-2023 ===
Frodsham by-election, 6 May 2021
Party	Candidate	Votes	%	±%
Conservative	Christopher Basey	1,481	44.4	−3.2
Labour	Michael Garvey	1,296	38.8	+13.9
Liberal Democrats	Patrick Eakin	384	11.5	+5.2
Green	Sian Day	176	5.3	−4.0
Majority		185	5.5	
Turnout		3,337		
Conservative hold		Swing		

Neston by-election, 6 May 2021
Party	Candidate	Votes	%	±%
Labour	Keith Millar	875	57.0	−5.2
Conservative	Steve Wastell	579	37.7	−0.1
Liberal Democrats	John Edwards	80	5.2	+5.2
Majority		296	19.3	
Turnout		1,534		
Labour hold		Swing		

=== 2023-2027 ===
Wolverham by-election, 2 May 2024
Party	Candidate	Votes	%	±%
Labour	John Stockton	576	70.2	−9.5
Green	Katie Grannell	73	8.9	+8.9
Independent	Jonathan Starkey	64	7.8	+7.8
Party of Women	Sally James	42	5.1	+5.1
Liberal Democrats	Elizabeth Jewkes	35	4.3	−4.7
Conservative	Luke Sharples	31	3.8	−7.5
Majority		503	61.3	
Turnout		821		
Labour hold		Swing		

Northwich Leftwich by-election, 4 July 2024
Party	Candidate	Votes	%	±%
Labour	Rachel Waterman	978	48.4	−10.8
Reform	Emma Guy	366	18.1	+12.6
Conservative	Penny Hitch	363	18.0	−11.9
Liberal Democrats	John Harding	163	8.1	+2.7
Green	Jonathan Stutfield	151	7.5	+7.5
Majority		612	30.3	
Turnout		2,021		
Labour hold		Swing		

Strawberry by-election, 2 October 2025
Party	Candidate	Votes	%	±%
Labour	Kris Fisher	602	35.8	−32.8
Reform	Jason Moorcroft	539	32.0	+32.0
Independent	Ray McHale	231	13.7	+13.7
Conservative	Nicholas Hebson	132	7.8	−16.8
Liberal Democrats	Lizzie Jewkes	121	7.2	+0.5
Green	Paul Bowers	58	3.4	+3.4
Majority		63	3.7	
Turnout		1,638		
Labour hold		Swing		

Willaston and Thornton by-election, 22 January 2026
Party	Candidate	Votes	%	±%
Conservative	Sion Roberts	997	53.8	−7.1
Labour	Edd Flynn	318	17.2	−9.3
Reform	Richard Hare	299	16.1	+16.1
Liberal Democrats	Carol Braithwaite	132	7.1	+2.4
Green	Scott Fulton-Brown	107	5.8	−2.2
Majority		679	36.6	
Turnout		1,853		
Conservative hold		Swing		

Christleton and Huntington by-election, 11 June 2026
Party	Candidate	Votes	%	±%
Conservative	Stephen Mosley	1,214	32.9	+8.5
Green	Steve Davies	1,122	30.4	+8.5
Reform	Martin Kemp	635	17.2	+17.2
Labour	Fran Riley	389	10.5	−9.4
Liberal Democrats	Chris Ward	331	9.0	−7.7
Majority		92	2.5	
Turnout		3,691		
Conservative hold		Swing		

Weaver and Cuddington by-election, 2 July 2026
Party	Candidate	Votes	%	±%
Independent	Gabrielle Goad	1,365	35.7	+35.7
Conservative	Patrick Melody	974	25.5	+3.8
Reform	Adam Wordsworth	778	20.4	+20.4
Labour	Bob Cernik	564	14.8	−5.8
Liberal Democrats	Elizabeth Jewkes	142	3.7	−12.0
Majority		391	10.2	
Turnout		3,823		
Independent gain from Conservative		Swing		
