= 2019 Cheshire West and Chester Council election =

2019 UK local government election

- 2 May 2019

All 70 seats on Cheshire West and Chester Council 36 seats needed for a majority
- Turnout: 34.7%

	First party	Second party	Third party
Leader	Samantha Dixon	Lynn Riley
Party	Labour	Conservative	Independent
Leader since	July 2014	17 May 2016
Leader's seat	Chester City and The Garden Quarter	Frodsham
Last election	38 seats, 34.7%	36 seats, 36.7%	1 seat, 3.0%
Seats before	38	35	2
Seats won	35	28	4
Seat change	▼3	▼7	▲2
Popular vote	59,096	63,003	9,348
Percentage	34.0%	35.7%	8.2%
Swing	▼0.7%	▼1.0%	▲5.2%
	Fourth party	Fifth party
Party	Liberal Democrats	Green
Last election	0 seats, 9.7%	0 seats, 6.4%
Seats before	0	0
Seats won	2	1
Seat change	▲2	▲1
Popular vote	19,705	8,609
Percentage	13.4%	7.9%
Swing	▲3.7%	▲1.5%
- Results of the 2019 election by ward
Leader of the Council before election
Samantha Dixon
Labour
Leader of the Council after election
Louise Gittins
Labour

The 2019 Cheshire West and Chester Council election took place on 2 May 2019 to elect members of Cheshire West and Chester Council in England. This was on the same day as other local elections. Five fewer seats were contested because of boundary changes. No party gained overall control. The Labour Party gained a seat but lost control of the council; the Conservatives lost 8 seats, while the Independents gained 4, the Liberal Democrats gained 2, and the Green Party gained one.

== Background ==
At the 2015 election, Cheshire West and Chester (CWaC) was the only council to be won by Labour from the Conservatives. The Liberal Democrats had lost their last seat on the council, while both UKIP and the Green Party had increased their vote share but failed to win seats. With only a narrow Labour majority, the Conservatives were hopeful of regaining the council. However, the aftermath of the Brexit referendum had significantly reshaped British party politics and BBC journalist Phil McCann noted that CWaC was the most evenly divided borough in the North West in terms of Leave/Remain, making the effect of Brexit on the election difficult to predict.

Between the 2015 and 2019 elections, a boundary review was carried out. The number of councillors was reduced from 75 to 70, with some wards merged and others split. In total, there were 219 candidates – 70 Conservative, 66 Labour, 49 Liberal Democrat, 18 Green, 11 independents (including Eveleigh Moore-Dutton, elected in 2015 as a Conservative), 4 UKIP and 1 For Britain Movement. 24 existing councillors stood down.

== Results ==
=== Councillor changes ===
==== New councillors ====
- Paul Bowers (Green, Helsby)
- Kate Cernik, (Labour, Northwich Winnington and Castle)
- Robert Cernik, (Labour, Northwich Winnington and Castle)
- Mandy Clare (Labour, Winsford Dene)
- Steve Collings (Labour, Great Boughton)
- Andrew Cooper (Labour, Northwich Leftwich)
- Lisa Denson (Labour, Westminster)
- Simon Eardley (Conservative, Saughall and Mollington)
- Gillian Edwards (Independent, Weaver and Cuddington)
- Mal Gaskill (Liberal Democrats, Winsford Swanlow)
- Gareth Gould (Labour, Strawberry)
- Graham Heatley (Conservative, Gowy Rural)
- Phil Herbert (Independent, Hartford and Greenbank)
- Adam Langan (Labour, Newton and Hoole)
- Gina Lewis (Labour, Winsford Over and Verdin)
- Sheila Little (Labour, Blacon)
- Phil Marshall (Conservative, Marbury)
- Joanne Moorcroft (Labour, Winsford Gravel)
- Nathan Pardoe (Labour, Winsford Wharton)
- Trish Richards (Labour, Blacon)
- Paul Roberts (Liberal Democrats, Farndon)
- Helen Treeby (Conservative, Rudheath)
- Christine Warner (Labour, Ledsham and Manor)
- Elton Watson (Conservative, Davenham, Moulton and Kingsmead)
- Peter Wheeler (Labour, Ledsham and Manor)
- Rachel Williams (Conservative, Malpas)

==== Outgoing councillors ====
- Gareth Anderson (Conservative) (Note: Did not stand for election.)
- David Armstrong (Labour)
- Don Beckett (Labour)
- Alex Black (Labour)
- Pamela Booher (Labour)
- Stephen Burns (Labour)
- Angie Chidley (Labour)
- Brian Clarke (Labour)
- Angela Claydon (Labour)
- Jess Crook (Labour)
- Brian Crowe (Conservative)
- Paul Dolan (Labour)
- Howard Greenwood (Conservative)
- Pamela Hall (Conservative)
- Don Hammond (Conservative)
- Eleanor Johnson (Conservative)
- Nigel Jones (Conservative)
- Susan Kaur (Conservative)
- Tony Lawrenson (Labour)
- Alan McKie (Conservative)
- Jane Mercer (Labour)
- Pat Merrick (Labour)
- Marie Nelson (Labour)
- Ralph Oultram (Conservative)
- James Pearson (Conservative)
- Tony Sherlock (Labour)
- Gaynor Sinar (Conservative)
- Stephen Smith (Labour)
- Chris Whitehurst (Conservative)

==== Re-elected councillors ====
- Val Armstrong (Labour, Lache)
- Martin Barker (Independent, Parkgate)
- Mike Baynham (Conservative, Winsford Over and Verdin)
- Richard Beacham (Labour, Newton and Hoole)
- Robert Bisset (Labour, Central and Grange)
- Tommy Blackmore (Labour, Winsford Over and Verdin)
- Keith Board (Conservative, Great Boughton)
- Matt Bryan (Labour, Upton)
- Razia Daniels (Conservative, Handbridge Park)
- Andrew Dawson (Conservative, Frodsham)
- Martyn Delaney (Labour, Chester City and The Garden Quarter)
- Hugo Deynem (Conservative, Sandstone)
- Samantha Dixon (Labour, Chester City and The Garden Quarter)
- Paul Donovan (Labour, Sutton Villages)
- Michael Edwardson (Labour, Wolverham)
- Charles Fifield (Conservative, Weaver and Cuddington)
- Carol Gahan (Labour, Blacon)
- Lynn Gibbon (Conservative, Marbury)
- Louise Gittins (Labour, Little Neston)
- Myles Hogg (Conservative, Willaston and Thornton)
- Jill Houlbrook (Conservative, Upton)
- Brian Jones (Labour, Whitby Groves)
- Mike Jones (Conservative, Tattenhall)
- John Leather (Conservative, Tarvin and Kelsall)
- Nicole Meardon (Labour, Sutton Villages)
- Eveleigh Moore Dutton (Independent, Tarporley)
- Sam Naylor (Labour, Northwich Witton)
- Margaret Parker (Conservative, Gowy Rural)
- Stuart Parker (Conservative, Christleton and Huntington)
- Patricia Parkes (Conservative, Hartford and Greenbank)
- Lynn Riley (Conservative, Frodsham)
- Diane Roberts (Labour, Netherpool)
- Peter Rooney (Labour, Whitby Park)
- Bob Rudd (Labour, Chester City and The Garden Quarter)
- Karen Shore (Labour, Central and Grange)
- Mark Stocks (Conservative, Shakerley)
- Neil Sullivan (Conservative, Handbridge Park)
- Harry Tonge (Conservative, Tarvin and Kelsall)
- Gill Watson (Labour, Newton and Hoole)
- Helen Weltman (Conservative, Davenham, Moulton and Kingsmead)
- Andy Williams (Labour, Neston)
- Mark Williams (Conservative, Christleton and Huntington)
- Paul Williams (Conservative, Weaver and Cuddington)
- Norman Wright (Conservative, Marbury)

=== Overall election result ===
2019 Cheshire West and Chester Council election
Party	Candidates	Seats	Gains	Losses	Net gain/loss	Seats %	Votes %	Votes	+/−
Labour	66	35	3	3	▼3	50.0	36.7	59,096	+2.0
Conservative	70	28	2	8	▼8	40.0	39.2	63,003	+2.5
Independent	11	4	3	0	▲3	5.7	5.8	9,348	+2.8
Liberal Democrats	49	2	2	0	▲2	2.9	12.3	19,705	+2.5
Green	18	1	1	0	▲1	1.4	5.4	8,609	–0.9
UKIP	4	0	0	0	Steady	0.0	0.6	958	–8.6
For Britain	1	0	0	0	Steady	0.0	0.1	131	N/A

Seats
1. Labour (50.0%)
2. Conservative (40.0%)
3. Independent (5.71%)
4. Liberal Democrats (2.86%)
5. Green (1.43%)

The election saw Labour narrowly lose its majority, winning 35 seats of the 70 available – a result local election analyst Andrew Teale attributed chiefly to the boundary changes – but remain the largest party. The Conservatives fell back considerably, with just 28 seats, but still won the largest share of the vote. The Liberal Democrats returned to the council, winning 2 seats in Winsford Swanlow (formerly Labour) and Farndon (formerly Conservative), and the Greens won their first ever seat on CWaC, taking Helsby from the Conservatives. Independents also surged – incumbents Martin Barker in Parkgate and Eveleigh Moore-Dutton in Tarporley held their seats, and two further independents won a seat from the Conservatives in the multi-member wards of Weaver and Cuddington, and Hartford and Greenbank. In April 2020, Hartford and Greenbank Independent Cllr Phil Herbert joined the Conservative Group.

=== Results by ward ===
==== Blacon ====
Blacon (3 seats)
Party	Candidate	Votes	%
Labour	Carol Margaret Gahan	1,593	61.0
Labour	Sheila Little	1,580	60.5
Labour	Trish Richards	1,507	57.7
Conservative	John Charles Mawson	694	26.6
Conservative	Maria Jombikova	586	22.4
Conservative	Richard Terence Short	574	22.0
Green	Diana Mary Wilderspin-Jones	414	15.9
Liberal Democrats	Kris James Patterson	210	2.9
Turnout		2,610	25.7
Labour hold			
Labour hold			
Labour hold			

==== Central and Grange ====
Central and Grange (2 seats)
Party	Candidate	Votes	%
Labour	Karen Louise Shore	1,142	72.0
Labour	Robert Ian Bisset	997	62.9
Liberal Democrats	Elizabeth Jewkes	259	16.3
Conservative	Andrew Wade Merrill	199	12.6
Conservative	Lynn Turnbull	182	11.5
Turnout		1,586	20.0
Labour hold			
Labour hold			

==== Chester City and The Garden Quarter ====
Chester City and The Garden Quarter (3 seats)
Party	Candidate	Votes	%
Labour	Samantha Kate Dixon	2,182	55.4
Labour	Bob Rudd	1,919	48.7
Labour	Martyn Delaney	1,829	46.4
Conservative	Chris Hughes	1,036	26.3
Conservative	Ashley James Avery-Bennett	1,016	25.8
Conservative	Mike Tomlinson	986	25.0
Green	Nicholas James Brown	754	19.1
Liberal Democrats	Ian Hopkinson	353	9.0
Liberal Democrats	Timothy Longman	320	8.1
Liberal Democrats	Amy Jo Mullis-Watkins	317	8.1
Independent	Terry Coe	310	7.9
Turnout		3,938	30.7
Labour hold			
Labour hold			
Labour hold			

==== Christleton and Huntington ====
Christleton and Huntington (2 seats)
Party	Candidate	Votes	%
Conservative	Mark Graham Williams	1,633	50.6
Conservative	Stuart Parker	1,570	48.6
Labour	Max Hudson	698	21.6
Labour	Andy Price	676	20.9
Green	David Andrew Ross Jones	528	16.4
Liberal Democrats	Christopher John Ward	504	15.6
Liberal Democrats	Robert Mark Hall-Jones	448	13.9
Turnout		3,228	38.9
Conservative hold			
Conservative hold			

==== Davenham, Moulton and Kingsmead ====
Davenham, Moulton and Kingsmead (2 seats)
Party	Candidate	Votes	%
Conservative	Helen Catherine Weltman	1,320	51.4
Conservative	Elton Philip Watson	1,228	47.8
Independent	Simon Gerald McDonald	687	26.7
Labour	Lyndsay Barwell	539	21.0
Labour	Ian Molton	439	17.1
Liberal Democrats	Jo Conchie	435	16.9
Turnout		2,569	31.6
Conservative hold			
Conservative hold			

==== Farndon ====
Farndon (1 seat)
Party	Candidate	Votes	%
Liberal Democrats	Paul David Roberts	982	60.8
Conservative	Robert Murrin Bailey	566	35.1
Labour	Patricia Anne Merrick	66	4.1
Turnout			44.7
Liberal Democrats gain from Conservative			

==== Frodsham ====
Frodsham (2 seats)
Party	Candidate	Votes	%
Conservative	Andrew William Dawson	1,652	50.0
Conservative	Lynn Riley	1,611	48.8
Labour	Michelle Parker	863	26.1
Labour	Michael John Garvey	834	25.3
Independent	Judith Ann Critchley	414	12.5
Green	Christine Mary Webber	324	9.8
Independent	Mallie Poulton	295	8.9
Liberal Democrats	Audrey Isobel Griffiths	219	6.6
Liberal Democrats	Ross Sibson	182	5.5
Turnout		3,302	43.8
Conservative hold			
Conservative hold			

==== Gowy Rural ====
Gowy Rural (2 seats)
Party	Candidate	Votes	%
Conservative	Margaret Phyllis Parker	1,272	48.6
Conservative	Graham Robert Heatley	1,262	48.2
Labour	John Joseph Heffernan	668	25.5
Labour	Jean Hardiman Smith	649	24.8
Green	Jackie Tait	506	19.3
Liberal Democrats	Glyn Jones	355	13.6
Turnout		2,616	35.9
Conservative hold			
Conservative gain from Labour			

==== Great Boughton ====
Great Boughton (2 seats)
Party	Candidate	Votes	%
Labour	Steve Collings	1,506	51.4
Conservative	Keith William Edward Board	1,394	47.6
Conservative	David Whitehead	1,328	45.3
Labour	Sandra Patricia Worger	1,239	42.3
Green	Gemma Macpherson	520	17.8
Liberal Democrats	Nala Rollo	380	13.0
Liberal Democrats	Matthew Simon Dunford	333	11.4
UKIP	Charles William Henry Dodman	329	11.2
Green	Ian John Francis Wade	327	11.2
Turnout		2,930	44.2
Conservative hold			
Labour gain from Conservative			

==== Handbridge Park ====
Handbridge Park (2 seats)
Party	Candidate	Votes	%
Conservative	Razia Daniels	1,849	47.8
Conservative	Neil Anthony Sullivan	1,666	43.1
Labour	Lisa Rossetti	1,287	33.3
Labour	Rhiannon Jade Taylor	1,001	25.9
Green	Mat Roberts	555	14.3
Liberal Democrats	Carol Anne Braithwaite	389	10.1
Liberal Democrats	Jonathan Daniel Rule	352	9.1
Turnout		3,867	49.5
Conservative hold			
Conservative hold			

==== Hartford and Greenbank ====
Hartford and Greenbank (2 seats)
Party	Candidate	Votes	%
Independent	Phil Herbert	1,048	37.2
Conservative	Patricia Mary Parkes	980	34.8
Independent	Martin David Loftus	907	32.2
Conservative	Gaynor Jean Sinar	825	29.3
Green	Mungo Douglas Stapledon Reid Dalglish	368	13.1
Labour	Kevin William Rimmer	368	13.1
Labour	Mitch Rowley	340	12.1
Turnout		2,820	38.1
Independent gain from Conservative			
Conservative hold			

==== Helsby ====
Helsby (1 seat)
Party	Candidate	Votes	%
Green	Paul Richard Bowers	1,015	54.8
Conservative	Terry O'Neill	524	28.3
Labour	Nigel David James	261	14.1
Liberal Democrats	David Heath	53	2.9
Turnout			45.0
Green gain from Conservative			

==== Lache ====
Lache (1 seat)
Party	Candidate	Votes	%
Labour	Val Armstrong	651	51.4
Conservative	Jack Alex Jackson	482	38.1
Liberal Democrats	Nicole Mary Fearon	133	10.5
Turnout			32.2
Labour hold			

==== Ledsham and Manor ====
Ledsham and Manor (2 seats)
Party	Candidate	Votes	%
Labour	Peter Joseph Wheeler	1,552	53.5
Labour	Christine Veronica Williams Warner	1,430	49.3
Conservative	Nic Hebson	1,032	35.6
Conservative	Francis Kwaku Kwateng	939	32.4
Liberal Democrats	Graham Handley	390	13.4
Turnout		2,902	38.3
Labour hold			
Labour gain from Conservative			

==== Little Neston ====
Little Neston (1 seat)
Party	Candidate	Votes	%
Labour	Louise Clare Gittins	1,008	46.9
Conservative	Nigel Graham Jones	969	45.1
Liberal Democrats	Rob Taylor	172	8.0
Turnout			51.7
Labour hold			

==== Malpas ====
Malpas (1 seat)
Party	Candidate	Votes	%
Conservative	Rachel Marion Williams	774	57.2
Independent	Charlie Higgie	478	35.4
Labour	Paula Irene D'Arcy	100	7.4
Turnout			37.2
Conservative hold			

==== Marbury ====
Marbury (3 seats)
Party	Candidate	Votes	%
Conservative	Lynn Joyce Gibbon	1,800	55.0
Conservative	Norman Geoffrey Wright	1,779	54.4
Conservative	Phil Marshall	1,597	48.8
Green	Sue Beesley	1,078	32.9
Liberal Democrats	Amy Barbara Elliott-Smith	880	26.9
Labour	Lee Paul McDonnell	770	23.5
Turnout		3,273	32.4
Conservative hold			
Conservative hold			
Conservative hold			

==== Neston ====
Neston (1 seat)
Party	Candidate	Votes	%
Labour	Andy Williams	800	62.2
Conservative	Dominic Philip Thornill Roberts	487	37.8
Turnout			31.9
Labour hold			

==== Netherpool ====
Netherpool (1 seat)
Party	Candidate	Votes	%
Labour	Diane Elizabeth Roberts	721	62.9
Conservative	Richard Thomas Soper	277	24.2
Liberal Democrats	Rosemarie Handley	148	12.9
Turnout			28.8
Labour hold			

==== Newton and Hoole ====
Newton and Hoole (3 seats)
Party	Candidate	Votes	%
Labour	Richard Mark Beacham	2,367	46.4
Labour	Adam Langan	2,325	45.6
Labour	Gill Watson	2,257	44.2
Liberal Democrats	Noel Francis McGlinchey	1,125	22.1
Conservative	Suzanne Booth	1,062	20.8
Conservative	Kate Elizabeth Vaughan	1,038	20.4
Liberal Democrats	Mark Andrew Williams	1,002	19.6
Liberal Democrats	Ellie Hopgood	948	18.6
Green	Simon Ward Brown	848	16.6
Conservative	Rebecca Wimpey	831	16.3
Independent	John Brian Ebo	608	11.9
Turnout		5,100	44.6
Labour hold			
Labour hold			
Labour hold			

==== Northwich Leftwich ====
Northwich Leftwich (1 seat)
Party	Candidate	Votes	%
Labour	Andrew Graham Cooper	481	50.0
Conservative	Linda Nelson	337	35.0
Liberal Democrats	Andrew Paul Hyde	145	15.1
Turnout			25.8
Labour gain from Conservative			

==== Northwich Winnington and Castle ====
Northwich Winnington and Castle (2 seats)
Party	Candidate	Votes	%
Labour	Kate Cernik	752	51.1
Labour	Robert Joseph Cernik	678	46.1
Conservative	Joanne Wright	571	38.8
Conservative	Kris Hinde	521	35.4
Liberal Democrats	Alice Philippa Chapman	242	16.4
Turnout		1,472	23.3
Labour hold			
Labour hold			

==== Northwich Witton ====
Northwich Witton (1 seat)
Party	Candidate	Votes	%
Labour	Sam Naylor	548	62.8
Conservative	Alfred Milliken	198	22.7
Liberal Democrats	Keith Hinde	127	14.6
Turnout			22.4
Labour hold			

==== Parkgate ====
Parkgate (1 seat)
Party	Candidate	Votes	%
Independent	Martin Trevor Barker	1,123	58.5
Conservative	Steve Wastell	482	25.1
Labour	John William Roach	173	9.0
Liberal Democrats	John Derry Lawrence Edwards	86	4.5
Green	Drew Bellis	57	3.0
Turnout			47.3
Independent hold			

==== Rudheath ====
Rudheath (1 seat)
Party	Candidate	Votes	%
Conservative	Helen Treeby	557	50.5
Labour	Helen Rowlands	449	40.7
Liberal Democrats	Roy Graham Griffiths	98	8.9
Turnout			27.3
Conservative gain from Labour			

==== Sandstone ====
Sandstone (1 seat)
Party	Candidate	Votes	%
Conservative	Hugo William Edward Deynem	949	52.8
Liberal Democrats	Rob Verity	337	18.7
Labour	Julie Dilworth	261	14.5
Green	Alexandra Dedman	251	14.0
Turnout			44.3
Conservative hold			

==== Saughall and Mollington ====
Saughall and Mollington (1 seat)
Party	Candidate	Votes	%
Conservative	Simon James Vernon Eardley	849	54.8
Labour	Sally Clare Atkin	490	31.6
Liberal Democrats	Justin Charles David Pemberton	211	13.6
Turnout			38.0
Conservative hold			

==== Shakerley ====
Shakerley (1 seat)
Party	Candidate	Votes	%
Conservative	Mark Lister Stocks	700	59.6
Liberal Democrats	John David Harding	249	21.2
Labour	Tony Lawrenson	225	19.2
Turnout			30.2
Conservative hold			

==== Strawberry ====
Strawberry (1 seat)
Party	Candidate	Votes	%
Labour	Gareth David Gould	962	67.5
Conservative	John Barclay Turnbull	464	32.5
Turnout			34.2
Labour hold			

==== Sutton Villages ====
Sutton Villages (2 seats)
Party	Candidate	Votes	%
Labour	Paul Francis Donovan	1,493	67.7
Labour	Nicole Meardon	1,426	64.6
Conservative	Brian Anderson	495	22.4
Conservative	Derek Harold Dickson	446	20.2
Liberal Democrats	Les Litwin	198	9.0
Turnout		2,206	27.0
Labour hold			
Labour hold			

==== Tarporley ====
Tarporley (1 seat)
Party	Candidate	Votes	%
Independent	Eveleigh Hilda Moore Dutton	1,266	65.7
Conservative	Nicholas Paul Blything	377	19.6
Liberal Democrats	Ian Douglas Priestner	165	8.6
Green	Christopher George Theodore Copeman	66	3.4
Labour	David Raymond Southall	52	2.7
Turnout			47.4
Independent gain from Conservative			

==== Tarvin and Kelsall ====
Tarvin and Kelsall (2 seats)
Party	Candidate	Votes	%
Conservative	John Alfred Leather	1,275	47.2
Conservative	Harry Tonge	1,054	39.0
Liberal Democrats	Ted Lush	1,033	38.2
Liberal Democrats	John Michael Oliver Edwards	869	32.1
Green	Anna Elise Crowder	415	15.3
Labour	Damon John Horrill	285	10.5
Turnout		2,703	37.3
Conservative hold			
Conservative hold			

==== Tattenhall ====
Tattenhall (1 seat)
Party	Candidate	Votes	%
Conservative	Mike Jones	720	53.5
Liberal Democrats	Vera Sandra Roberts	230	17.1
Green	Michael John Boxall	217	16.1
Labour	Angie Chidley	178	13.2
Turnout			35.6
Conservative hold			

==== Upton ====
Upton (2 seats)
Party	Candidate	Votes	%
Labour	Matt Bryan	1,485	45.2
Conservative	Jill Houlbrook	1,361	41.4
Labour	Chloe Rebecca Loseby	1,230	37.4
Conservative	Gary John Hulmes	1,050	32.0
Liberal Democrats	Jean Elizabeth Evans	572	17.4
UKIP	Frank Samuel	258	7.8
UKIP	Alison Jane Samuel	243	7.4
Turnout		3,285	43.6
Labour hold			
Conservative hold			

==== Weaver and Cuddington ====
Weaver and Cuddington (3 seats)
Party	Candidate	Votes	%
Independent	Gillian Edwards	2,212	50.4
Conservative	Paul Williams	2,062	47.0
Conservative	Charles Grant Fifield	2,027	46.2
Conservative	Adam Douglas Wordsworth	1,605	36.5
Liberal Democrats	Steve Donhue	1,041	23.7
Labour	Chris Perkes	875	19.9
Liberal Democrats	Martin England	669	15.2
Labour	John Alexander Gordon	650	14.8
Turnout		4,391	37.7
Independent gain from Conservative			
Conservative hold			
Conservative hold			

==== Westminster ====
Westminster (1 seat)
Party	Candidate	Votes	%
Labour	Lisa Valerie Denson	583	71.7
For Britain	Mark Andrew Hartley	131	16.1
Conservative	Graham Pritchard	99	12.2
Turnout			24.0
Labour hold			

==== Whitby Groves ====
Whitby Groves (1 seat)
Party	Candidate	Votes	%
Labour	Brian Jones	750	61.0
Conservative	Nick Lacey	480	39.0
Turnout			34.2
Labour hold			

==== Whitby Park ====
Whitby Park (1 seat)
Party	Candidate	Votes	%
Labour	Peter Anthony Rooney	717	61.8
Conservative	Linda Ellen Cooper	357	30.8
Liberal Democrats	Kurt Frederick Jewkes	86	7.4
Turnout			29.2
Labour hold			

==== Willaston and Thornton ====
Willaston and Thornton (1 seat)
Party	Candidate	Votes	%
Conservative	Myles Hogg	1,383	79.0
Labour	Matthew Bracken	368	21.0
Turnout			42.7
Conservative hold			

==== Winsford Dene ====
Winsford Dene (1 seat)
Party	Candidate	Votes	%
Labour	Mandy Clare	487	52.0
Liberal Democrats	Ailsa Louise Gaskill-Jones	178	19.0
Conservative	Liz Porritt	143	15.3
UKIP	Andrew David Mann	128	13.7
Turnout			25.8
Labour hold			

==== Winsford Gravel ====
Winsford Gravel (1 seat)
Party	Candidate	Votes	%
Labour	Joanne Elizabeth Moorcroft	434	51.8
Conservative	Saundra Edith Alice Middleton	250	29.8
Liberal Democrats	Paul Carter	154	18.4
Turnout			26.1
Labour hold			

==== Winsford Over and Verdin ====
Winsford Over and Verdin (3 seats)
Party	Candidate	Votes	%
Labour	Tommy Blackmore	1,250	43.1
Labour	Gina Lewis	1,178	40.6
Conservative	Mike Baynham	974	33.5
Labour	David William Snowdon Stearne	967	33.3
Conservative	James Joseph Pearson	850	29.3
Conservative	David Thomas	838	28.9
Liberal Democrats	Bob Barton	551	19.0
Liberal Democrats	Charlie Parkinson	509	17.5
Liberal Democrats	Brandon Parkey	419	14.4
Green	Christopher Simon Payne	366	12.6
Turnout		2,903	28.1
Conservative hold			
Labour hold			
Labour hold			

==== Winsford Swanlow ====
Winsford Swanlow (1 seat)
Party	Candidate	Votes	%
Liberal Democrats	Mal Gaskill	372	36.8
Labour	Stephen Burns	361	35.7
Conservative	Shaun Vincent Hopkins	278	27.5
Turnout			28.9
Liberal Democrats gain from Labour			

==== Winsford Wharton ====
Winsford Wharton (1 seat)
Party	Candidate	Votes	%
Labour	Nathan Pardoe	425	51.7
Liberal Democrats	Bev Theron	275	33.5
Conservative	David Scott McNeilage	122	14.8
Turnout			22.1
Labour hold			

==== Wolverham ====
Wolverham (1 seat)
Party	Candidate	Votes	%
Labour	Michael Edwardson	719	86.8
Conservative	Gordon Douglas Grant Meldrum	109	13.2
Turnout			22.1
Labour hold			

== Changes 2019–2023 ==
- In April 2020, Hartford and Greenbank independent councillor Phil Herbert joined the Conservative Group.
- Martyn Delaney, who was elected for Labour in Chester City and The Garden Quarter, left the party to sit as a non-aligned independent councillor, reported in June 2022.

=== By-elections ===
==== Frodsham ====
Frodsham by-election: 6 May 2021
Party	Candidate	Votes	%	±%
Conservative	Chris Basey	1,481	44.1	New
Labour	Michael John Garvey	1,296	38.6	+13.3
Liberal Democrats	Patrick Thomas	384	11.4	New
Green	Sian Day	176	5.2	New
Majority		185	5.5	
Turnout		3,360	44.9	
Conservative hold				

The by-election was triggered by the resignation of the sitting Conservative councillor, Andrew Dawson, who stood down after being appointed Head of Legal Services to the Falkland Islands Government, effective from the council's ordinary meeting of 22 October 2020.

==== Neston ====
Neston by-election: 6 May 2021
Party	Candidate	Votes	%	±%
Labour	Keith Millar	875	56.5	New
Conservative	Steve Wastell	579	37.4	New
Liberal Democrats	John Derry Lawrence Edwards	80	5.2	New
Majority		296	19.1	
Turnout		1,548	36.4	
Labour hold		Swing	2.7	

The by-election was triggered by the death of the sitting Labour councillor, Andy Williams, in April 2020.
