= Samantha Dixon =

British politician

Samantha Dixon MBE MP
- Official portrait, 2026

Parliamentary Under-Secretary of State for Building Safety, Fire and Local Growth
- In office 6 September 2025 – 22 July 2026
- Prime Minister: Keir Starmer
- Preceded by: Alex Norris
- Succeeded by: The Baroness Blake of Leeds

Vice-Chamberlain of the Household
- In office 10 July 2024 – 6 September 2025
- Prime Minister: Keir Starmer
- Preceded by: Stuart Anderson
- Succeeded by: Lilian Greenwood

Member of Parliament for Chester North and Neston City of Chester (2022–2024)
- Incumbent
- Assumed office 1 December 2022
- Preceded by: Chris Matheson
- Majority: 11,870 (26.6%)

Leader of Cheshire West and Chester Council
- In office 21 May 2015 – 21 May 2019
- Preceded by: Mike Jones
- Succeeded by: Louise Gittins

Member of Cheshire West and Chester Council
- In office 5 May 2011 – 4 May 2023
- Ward: Chester City and the Garden Quarter

Personal details
- Born: Samantha Kate Georgeson Reading, Berkshire, England
- Party: Labour
- Education: University of Sheffield (BA)
- Website: Official website

Samantha Kate Dixon MBE (née Georgeson,) is a British politician who serves as Member of Parliament (MP) for Chester North and Neston. She sat for the predecessor seat of City of Chester from a 2022 by-election until the seat's abolition at the 2024 general election. A member of the Labour Party, she was Leader of Cheshire West and Chester Council from 2015 to 2019. She has served as a Parliamentary Under-Secretary of State in the Ministry of Housing, Communities and Local Government since 2025.

== Early life ==
Samantha Kate Georgeson was born in Reading, Berkshire. Her family moved to Chester when she was four-years-old, and she has lived Hoole and Upton-by-Chester. She was educated at Christleton High School.

Dixon received a Bachelor of Arts in English literature from University of Sheffield in 1987. She worked for Sotheby's as a senior press officer from 1989 to 1997.

== Political career ==
=== Local government career ===
Dixon was first elected to Cheshire West and Chester Council in 2011, representing Chester City and the Garden Quarter ward. She was re-elected in 2015 and 2019, but didn't seek election in 2023.

Labour won control of the council in 2015, and she was subsequently elected to become its first woman leader. She stood down as leader after the 2019 local elections, when Labour retained the council leadership but lost their majority.

Dixon was appointed a Member of the Order of the British Empire (MBE) in the 2022 Birthday Honours for 'political service'.

=== Parliamentary career ===
In October 2022, Dixon was selected as the Labour candidate for the City of Chester by-election. The by-election was triggered after the resignation of incumbent Labour MP Chris Matheson. One of her campaign pledges was to make the historic Chester Rows a World Heritage Site.

The by-election itself saw nine candidates, with 28,541 votes in total and a turnout of 41.2% of the local electorate. Dixon won with 60.8% of the vote, 17,309 votes, and a majority of 10,974. After her victory she said she would "fight Chester's corner" in Westminster.

She was sworn into the House of Commons on 5 December, and was welcomed to Parliament on 7 December by Keir Starmer and Labour MPs. She was also the first Member of Parliament elected during the reign of Charles III.

Dixon was appointed Parliamentary Private Secretary to Rachel Reeves in February 2023. She was promoted to become an opposition whip in September of the same year. In April 2024, a man was found guilty of the stalking and harassment of Dixon.

Dixon stood in the new constituency of Chester North and Neston in the 2024 general election, and she was elected. Following the election, she was appointed a Government Whip (Vice-Chamberlain of the Household). On 17 July 2024, she was ceremonially "taken hostage" during the 2024 State Opening of Parliament.

== Personal life ==
Dixon is married to Nicholas and has three children. Her recreations include knitting.

Parliament of the United Kingdom
Preceded by Chris Matheson	Member of Parliament for City of Chester; 2022–2024	Constituency abolished
New constituency	Member of Parliament for Chester North and Neston; 2024–present	Incumbent
