= 2011 Cheshire West and Chester Council election =

2011 UK local government election

Cheshire West and Chester Council Election, 2011
| ← 2008 | 5 May 2011 | 2015 → |

All 75 seats on Cheshire West and Chester Council 38 seats needed for a majority
| | First party | Second party | Third party |
|---|---|---|---|
| Leader | Mike Jones | Derek Bateman |
| Party | Conservative | Labour | Liberal Democrats |
| Leader's seat | Tattenhall | Ellesmere Port Town |
| Last election | 55 | 13 | 4 |
| Seats before | 50 | 13 | 4 |
| Seats won | ▼8 | ▲19 | ▼3 |
| Seats after | 42 | 32 | 1 |
| Popular vote | 84,705 | 69,829 | 22,223 |
| | Fourth party | Fifth party |
| Leader | | Richard Lowe (Note: As the only UKIP councillor, Richard Lowe was their de facto group leader, no UKIP candidates were subsequently elected.) |
| Party | Independent | UKIP |
| Leader's seat | | Garden Quarter (defeated) |
| Last election | 0 | 0 |
| Seats before | 4 | 1 |
| Seats won | ▼4 | ▼1 |
| Seats after | 0 | 0 |
| Popular vote | 5,732 | 2,889 |
Leader of the Council before election
Mike Jones
Conservative
Leader of the Council after election
Mike Jones
Conservative

The 2011 elections to Cheshire West and Chester Borough Council were the first elections to this Council after it had been re-warded into a mixture of single-, two- and three-member wards. They took place on 5 May alongside the 2011 United Kingdom Alternative Vote referendum. The previous election held for 2008 were based on the old Cheshire County Council electoral divisions each of which returned 3 members. The 2008 elections elected 72 members to serve first on the shadow authority and then, with effect from 1 April 2009, the new Council when it took over responsibility for the delivery of local government services.

Given the re-warding that took place in time for the 2011 elections, direct comparisons between the 2008 and 2011 results are problematic. Superficially, the 2011 results give the impression of a dramatic swing to Labour when compared with the 2008 results; however, this is misleading. In 2008, the Labour Party was particularly unpopular, with the local government elections taking place shortly after the '10p tax rate' had been abolished, plunging Labour support to a particular low. This unpopularity, coupled with the then large electoral wards electing three councillors per ward, and the first-past-the-post system, very much favoured the then leading party in the opinion polls – the Conservatives – who, in 2008, won a much greater majority than had otherwise been predicted.

The 2011 elections with the re-warding took place one year into the national Conservative–Liberal Democrat coalition, at a time when support for the Liberal Democrats was at a particular low. Nationally, Labour's support had rallied considerably when compared with 2008.

Before the elections in 2011, the majority Conservative party suffered a small number of defections, principally almost certainly associated with existing councillors failing to be selected by the party to fight the seat of their choice.

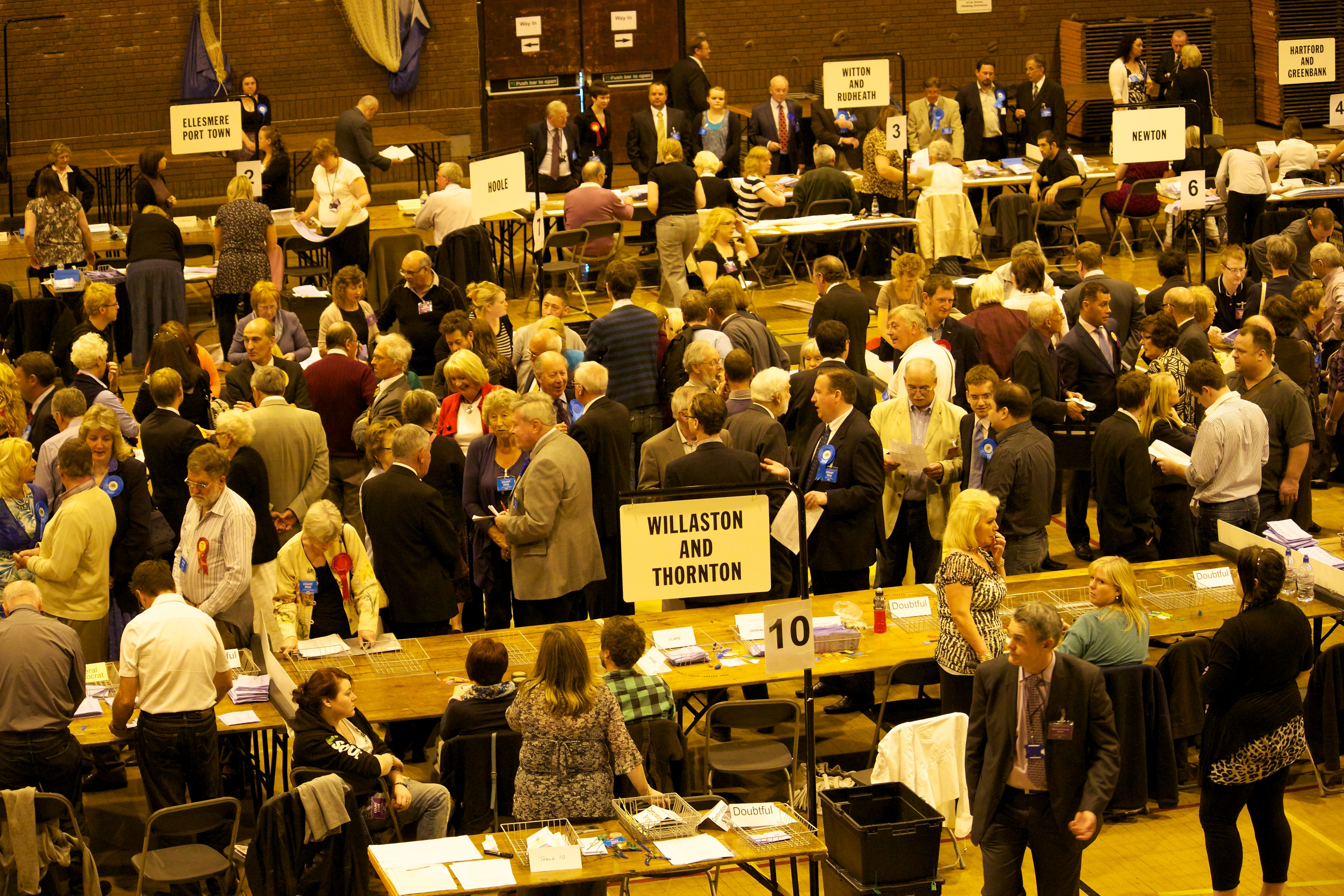
The count at Northgate Arena.

As noted, the Conservatives had reduced in number from 55 to 50 through resignations, defections and withdrawal of the party whip associated with the processes for selection of candidates to fight the 2011 election.

Four political groups which had unsuccessfully put forward candidates in 2008 did not do so in 2011. Several deselected Conservatives stood without the party whip, but there were no other independent candidates.

== Results summary ==
Seats
1. Conservative (56%)
2. Labour (42.6%)
3. Liberal Democrats (1.33%)
Vote share
1. Conservative 45.34 (45.3%)
2. Labour 37.38 (37.4%)
3. Liberal Democrats 11.9 (11.9%)
4. Independent 3.07 (3.07%)
5. UKIP 1.55 (1.55%)
6. Green 0.56 (0.56%)
7. Socialist Labour 0.13 (0.13%)
8. BNP 0.08 (0.08%)

Summary of the 2011 Cheshire West and Chester Council election results
| Political party | Group leader | Candidates | Total votes | Total seats | Seats, net change | Seats, of total (%) | Votes, of total (%) | Total votes, change (%) |
|---|---|---|---|---|---|---|---|---|
| Conservative | Mike Jones | 75 | 84,705 | 42 | ▼8 | 56 | 45.34 | |
| Labour | Derek Bateman | 75 | 69,829 | 32 | ▲19 | 42.6 | 37.38 | |
| Liberal Democrats | — | 51 | 22,223 | 1 | ▼3 | 1.33 | 11.90 | |
| Independent | — | 9 | 5,732 | 0 | ▼4 | 0 | 3.07 | |
| UKIP | Richard Lowe | 15 | 2,889 | 0 | ▼1 | 0 | 1.55 | |
| Green | — | 4 | 1,042 | 0 | Steady | 0 | 0.56 | |
| Socialist Labour | — | 1 | 251 | 0 | Steady | 0 | 0.13 | |
| BNP | — | 1 | 151 | 0 | Steady | 0 | 0.08 | |

Seat composition between 2008 (top) and 2011 (bottom):

| 55 | 13 | 4 |

| 42 | 32 | 1 |

=== Councillor changes ===
==== New councillors ====
- David Armstrong (Labour, Winsford Swanlow and Dene)
- Alex Black (Labour, Hoole)
- Tom Blackmore (Labour, Winsford Over and Verdin)
- Stephen Burns (Labour, Winsford Swanlow and Dene)
- Keith Butcher (Labour, Ledsham and Manor)
- Samantha Dixon (Labour, Chester City)
- Paul Dolan (Labour, Winnington and Castle)
- Charles Fifield (Conservative, Weaver and Cuddington)
- Carolyn Graham (Labour, Blacon)
- Howard Greenwood (Conservative, Farndon)
- Louise Gittins (Labour, Little Neston and Burton)
- Don Hammond (Conservative, Marbury)
- Graham Heatley (Conservative, Elton)
- Mark Henesy (Labour, Sutton)
- Brian Jones (Labour, Whitby)
- Lynda Jones (Conservative, Winsford Over and Verdin)
- Tony Lawrenson (Labour, Witton and Rudheath)
- John Leather (Conservative, Tarvin and Kelsall)
- Nicole Meardon (Labour, Sutton)
- Amy Mercer-Bailey (Labour, Winnington and Castle)
- Eveleigh Moore Dutton (Conservative, Tarporley)
- Margaret Parker (Conservative, Chester Villages)
- Ben Powell (Labour, St Paul's)
- Diane Roberts (Labour, Netherpool)
- David Robinson (Labour, Boughton)
- Bob Rudd (Labour, Garden Quarter)
- Gaynor Sinar (Conservative, Davenham and Moulton)
- Neil Sullivan (Conservative, Handbridge Park)
- Julia Tickridge (Labour, Witton and Rudheath)
- Elton Watson (Conservative, Davenham and Moulton)
- Andrew Williams (Labour, Neston)

==== Outgoing councillors ====
- Brian Anderson (Conservative)
- Kimberley Anderson (Conservative)
- Brian Bailey (Independent)
- Bob Barton (Liberal Democrats)
- Kate Birtwistle (Conservative)
- Terry Birtwistle (Conservative)
- Lynn Clare (Labour)
- Linda Cooper (Conservative) (Note: Did not stand for election.)
- Max Drury (Conservative)
- John Ebo (Conservative)
- Malcolm Gaskill (Liberal Democrats)
- Arthur Harada (Conservative)
- Mark Ingram (Conservative)
- Katherine Lord (Conservative)
- Pat Lott (Conservative)
- Richard Lowe (UKIP)
- Jan Mashlan (Conservative)
- Simon McDonald (Independent)
- William Mealor (Conservative)
- George Miller (Conservative)
- Andrew Needham (Conservative)
- Charlie Parkinson (Liberal Democrats)
- Neil Ritchie (Conservative)
- Barbara Roberts (Independent)
- Richard Short (Conservative)
- Graham Smith (Conservative)
- Andrew Storrar (Independent)
- Keith Wilson (Conservative)

==== Re-elected councillors ====
- Gareth Anderson (Conservative, Ledsham and Manor)
- Derek Bateman (Labour, Ellesmere Port Town)
- Don Beckett (Winsford Over and Verdin, Labour)
- Keith Board (Conservative, Great Boughton)
- Pamela Booher (Labour, Winsford Wharton)
- Malcolm Byram (Conservative, Marbury)
- Brian Clarke (Labour, Winsford Wharton)
- Angela Claydon (Labour, St Paul's)
- Bob Crompton (Conservative, Whitby)
- Brian Crowe (Conservative, Saughall and Mollington)
- Razia Daniels (Conservative, Handbridge Park)
- Andrew Dawson (Conservative, Frodsham)
- Hugo Deynem (Conservative, Tarvin and Kelsall)
- Paul Donovan (Labour, Sutton)
- Brenda Dowding (Conservative, Parkgate)
- Leslie Ford (Conservative, Helsby)
- John Grimshaw (Conservative, Weaver and Cuddington)
- Pamela Hall (Conservative, Great Boughton)
- Myles Hogg (Conservative, Willaston and Thornton)
- Jill Houlbrook (Conservative, Upton)
- Eleanor Johnson (Conservative, Gowy)
- Mike Jones (Conservative, Tattenhall)
- Reggie Jones (Labour, Blacon)
- Kay Loch (Conservative, Little Neston and Burton)
- Justin Madders (Labour, Ellesmere Port Town)
- Herbert Manley (Conservative, Hartford and Greenbank)
- Alan McKie (Conservative, Weaver and Cuddington)
- Hilarie McNae (Conservative, Upton)
- Pat Merrick (Labour, Rossmore)
- Keith Musgrave (Conservative, Hartford and Greenbank)
- Marie Nelson (Labour, Blacon)
- Ralph Oultram (Conservative, Kingsley)
- Stuart Parker (Conservative, Chester Villages)
- Tom Parry (Conservative, Newton)
- Lynn Riley (Conservative, Frodsham)
- Tony Sherlock (Labour, Grange)
- Mark Stocks (Conservative, Shakerley)
- Alexandra Tate (Labour, Lache)
- Bob Thompson (Liberal Democrats, Hoole)
- Adrian Walmsley (Conservative, Newton)
- Helen Weltman (Conservative, Davenham and Moulton)
- Mark Williams (Conservative, Dodleston and Huntington)
- Ann Wright (Conservative, Malpas)
- Norman Wright (Conservative, Marbury)

== Results by ward ==
=== Blacon ===
Blacon (3 seats)
| Party | Candidate | Votes | % | ±% |
|---|---|---|---|---|
| Labour | Reggie Jones | 2,103 | 24.20 | |
| Labour | Marie Nelson | 1,906 | 21.93 | |
| Labour | Carolyn Graham | 1,725 | 19.85 | |
| Conservative | Bob Blacker | 850 | 9.78 | |
| Conservative | Danny Worley | 722 | 8.88 | |
| Conservative | Nick Watkins | 735 | 8.46 | |
| UKIP | Alan Weddell | 302 | 3.48 | |
| UKIP | David Evans | 297 | 3.42 | |

=== Boughton ===
Boughton (1 seat)
| Party | Candidate | Votes | % | ±% |
|---|---|---|---|---|
| Labour | David Robinson | 960 | 52.09 | |
| Conservative | Michael Turvey | 744 | 40.37 | |
| Liberal Democrats | James Latham | 139 | 7.54 | |

=== Chester City ===
Chester City (1 seat)
| Party | Candidate | Votes | % | ±% |
|---|---|---|---|---|
| Labour | Samantha Dixon | 519 | 46.88 | |
| Conservative | Pauline Brown | 465 | 42.01 | |
| Liberal Democrats | Sandy Clyne | 82 | 7.41 | |
| UKIP | David Scott | 41 | 3.70 | |

=== Chester Villages ===
Chester Villages (Christleton, Guilden Sutton, Mickle Trafford and Waverton, 2 seats)
| Party | Candidate | Votes | % | ±% |
|---|---|---|---|---|
| Conservative | Stuart Parker | 1,941 | 28.54 | |
| Conservative | Margaret Parker | 1,880 | 27.64 | |
| Labour | Paul Cornwall | 815 | 11.98 | |
| Independent | Brian Bailey | 812 | 11.94 | |
| Labour | Steve Davies | 758 | 11.15 | |
| Independent | Michael Roberts | 595 | 8.75 | |

=== Davenham and Moulton ===
Davenham and Moulton (3 seats)
| Party | Candidate | Votes | % | ±% |
|---|---|---|---|---|
| Conservative | Elton Watson | 1,638 | 15.82 | |
| Conservative | Helen Weltman | 1,619 | 15.64 | |
| Conservative | Gaynor Sinar | 1,432 | 13.83 | |
| Labour | Mark Green | 1,056 | 10.2 | |
| Labour | Robert Harmston | 1,056 | 10.2 | |
| Labour | David Speak | 1,016 | 9.81 | |
| Liberal Democrats | Arthur Wood | 724 | 6.99 | |
| Independent | Sarah Flannery | 674 | 6.51 | |
| Green | Howard Thorp | 447 | 4.32 | |
| Independent | Emma Guy | 405 | 3.91 | |
| Independent | Simon McDonald | 285 | 2.75 | |

=== Dodleston and Huntington ===
Dodleston and Huntington (1 seat)
| Party | Candidate | Votes | % | ±% |
|---|---|---|---|---|
| Conservative | Mark Williams | 1,008 | 63.40 | |
| Labour | John Creswick | 372 | 23.40 | |
| Liberal Democrats | Christopher Ward | 210 | 13.21 | |

=== Ellesmere Port Town ===
Ellesmere Port Town (2 seats)
| Party | Candidate | Votes | % | ±% |
|---|---|---|---|---|
| Labour | Derek Bateman | 1,522 | 45.47 | |
| Labour | Justin Madders | 1,212 | 36.21 | |
| Conservative | Graham Pritchard | 258 | 7.71 | |
| Conservative | Gordon Meldrum | 226 | 6.75 | |
| Liberal Democrats | Michael Shipman | 129 | 3.85 | |

=== Elton ===
Elton (1 seat)
| Party | Candidate | Votes | % | ±% |
|---|---|---|---|---|
| Conservative | Graham Heatley | 683 | 51.05 | |
| Labour | Tony Mills | 655 | 48.95 | |

=== Farndon ===
Farndon (1 seat)
| Party | Candidate | Votes | % | ±% |
|---|---|---|---|---|
| Conservative | Howard Greenwood | 937 | 55.67 | |
| Liberal Democrats | Paul Roberts | 548 | 32.56 | |
| Labour | Susan Pearson | 198 | 11.76 | |

=== Frodsham ===
Frodsham (2 seats)
| Party | Candidate | Votes | % | ±% |
|---|---|---|---|---|
| Conservative | Andrew Dawson | 1,801 | 30.55 | |
| Conservative | Lynn Riley | 1,625 | 27.57 | |
| Labour | Anna Huchinson | 1,163 | 19.73 | |
| Labour | Kyle McGregor | 1,021 | 17.32 | |
| Liberal Democrats | Marilyn Theron | 285 | 4.83 | |

=== Garden Quarter ===
Garden Quarter (1 seat)
| Party | Candidate | Votes | % | ±% |
|---|---|---|---|---|
| Labour | Bob Rudd | 497 | 48.82 | |
| Conservative | Aden Lucas | 270 | 26.52 | |
| Liberal Democrats | Sarah-Jane Smith | 105 | 10.31 | |
| Green | Simon Brown | 74 | 7.27 | |
| UKIP | Richard Lowe | 72 | 7.07 | |

=== Gowy ===
Gowy (1 seat)
| Party | Candidate | Votes | % | ±% |
|---|---|---|---|---|
| Conservative | Eleanor Johnson | 1,118 | 64.81 | |
| Green | Jackie Tait | 248 | 14.38 | |
| Labour | Nick Dixon | 230 | 13.33 | |
| Liberal Democrats | Andrew Hyde | 129 | 7.48 | |

=== Grange ===
Grange (1 seat)
| Party | Candidate | Votes | % | ±% |
|---|---|---|---|---|
| Labour | Tony Sherlock | 844 | 82.58 | |
| Conservative | Sandra Evans | 178 | 17.42 | |

=== Great Boughton ===
Great Boughton (2 seats)
| Party | Candidate | Votes | % | ±% |
|---|---|---|---|---|
| Conservative | Pamela Hall | 1,551 | 22.84 | |
| Conservative | Keith Board | 1,502 | 22.12 | |
| Labour | Helen Heaviside | 827 | 12.18 | |
| Liberal Democrats | Ann Farrell | 795 | 11.71 | |
| Labour | Peter Barnard | 783 | 11.53 | |
| Liberal Democrats | Rose Price | 751 | 11.06 | |
| UKIP | Peter Lowe | 335 | 4.93 | |
| UKIP | Charles Dodman | 247 | 3.46 | |

=== Handbridge Park ===
Handbridge Park (2 seats)
| Party | Candidate | Votes | % | ±% |
|---|---|---|---|---|
| Conservative | Razia Daniels | 2,406 | 31.43 | |
| Conservative | Neil Sullivan | 2,030 | 26.52 | |
| Labour | Pamela Stanley | 1,167 | 15.25 | |
| Labour | Phillip Tate | 1,016 | 13.27 | |
| Liberal Democrats | Phil Taylor | 392 | 5.12 | |
| Liberal Democrats | Christopher Reeve | 321 | 4.19 | |
| UKIP | Wendy Moore | 172 | 2.25 | |
| UKIP | Peter Steele | 150 | 1.96 | |

=== Hartford and Greenbank ===
Hartford and Greenbank (2 seats)
| Party | Candidate | Votes | % | ±% |
|---|---|---|---|---|
| Conservative | Herbert Manley | 1,718 | 32.30 | |
| Conservative | Keith Musgrave | 1,694 | 31.85 | |
| Labour | George Gibson | 797 | 14.98 | |
| Labour | Eric Mashiter | 612 | 11.51 | |
| Liberal Democrats | Allan Clark | 498 | 9.36 | |

=== Helsby ===
Helsby (1 seat)
| Party | Candidate | Votes | % | ±% |
|---|---|---|---|---|
| Conservative | Leslie Ford | 886 | 50.80 | |
| Labour | Una Long | 646 | 37.04 | |
| Liberal Democrats | Joan Laming | 212 | 12.16 | |

=== Hoole ===
Hoole (2 seats)
| Party | Candidate | Votes | % | ±% |
|---|---|---|---|---|
| Liberal Democrats | Bob Thompson | 1,211 | 18.80 | |
| Labour | Alex Black | 1,108 | 17.20 | |
| Conservative | John Ebo | 989 | 15.35 | |
| Liberal Democrats | David Mead | 943 | 14.64 | |
| Conservative | Lesley George | 904 | 14.04 | |
| Labour | Jason Stiles | 740 | 11.49 | |
| Green | Diana Wilderspin-Jones | 273 | 4.24 | |
| Independent | John Whittingham | 110 | 1.71 | |
| UKIP | Stephen Nichols | 90 | 1.40 | |
| UKIP | Roger Coston | 73 | 1.13 | |

=== Kingsley ===
Kingsley (1 seat)
| Party | Candidate | Votes | % | ±% |
|---|---|---|---|---|
| Conservative | Ralph Oultram | 1,192 | 65.86 | |
| Labour | Jill Peters | 416 | 22.98 | |
| Liberal Democrats | George England | 202 | 11.16 | |

=== Lache ===
Lache (1 seat)
| Party | Candidate | Votes | % | ±% |
|---|---|---|---|---|
| Labour | Alexandra Tate | 916 | 52.73 | |
| Conservative | Mike Tomlinson | 653 | 37.59 | |
| UKIP | John Moore | 96 | 5.53 | |
| Liberal Democrats | Aminul Hassan | 72 | 4.15 | |

=== Ledsham and Manor ===
Ledsham and Manor (2 seats)
| Party | Candidate | Votes | % | ±% |
|---|---|---|---|---|
| Conservative | Gareth Anderson | 1,213 | 24.53 | |
| Labour | Keith Butcher | 1,138 | 23.01 | |
| Labour | Edward Lloyd | 1,089 | 22.02 | |
| Conservative | Graham Smith | 1,067 | 21.58 | |
| UKIP | Neil Gregory | 246 | 4.97 | |
| Liberal Democrats | Robert Taylor | 192 | 3.88 | |

=== Little Neston and Burton ===
Little Neston and Burton (2 seats)
| Party | Candidate | Votes | % | ±% |
|---|---|---|---|---|
| Conservative | Kay Loch | 1,373 | 21.09 | |
| Labour | Louise Gittins | 1,036 | 15.91 | |
| Conservative | Richard Short | 989 | 15.19 | |
| Liberal Democrats | Tony Cummins | 961 | 14.76 | |
| Liberal Democrats | Derek Gaskell | 957 | 14.70 | |
| Labour | Robert Perry | 895 | 13.75 | |
| UKIP | Henry Crocker | 300 | 4.61 | |

=== Malpas ===
Malpas (1 seat)
| Party | Candidate | Votes | % | ±% |
|---|---|---|---|---|
| Conservative | Ann Wright | 988 | 69.77 | |
| Liberal Democrats | Sherrie Roberts | 253 | 17.87 | |
| Labour | Nonny Shearer | 175 | 12.36 | |

=== Marbury ===
Marbury (3 seats)
| Party | Candidate | Votes | % | ±% |
|---|---|---|---|---|
| Conservative | Malcolm Byram | 2,328 | 22.27 | |
| Conservative | Norman Wright | 2,265 | 21.67 | |
| Conservative | Don Hammond | 2,035 | 19.47 | |
| Labour | Gillian Gough | 1,184 | 11.33 | |
| Labour | Andy Stott | 1,122 | 10.73 | |
| Labour | Noel Huchinson | 948 | 9.07 | |
| Liberal Democrats | Alan Bailey | 572 | 5.47 | |

=== Neston ===
Neston (1 seat)
| Party | Candidate | Votes | % | ±% |
|---|---|---|---|---|
| Labour | Andrew Williams | 708 | 51.83 | |
| Conservative | William Mealor | 549 | 40.19 | |
| Liberal Democrats | Tom Marlow | 109 | 7.98 | |

=== Netherpool ===
Netherpool (1 seat)
| Party | Candidate | Votes | % | ±% |
|---|---|---|---|---|
| Labour | Diane Roberts | 707 | 79.89 | |
| Conservative | Nigel Hunt | 178 | 20.11 | |
| Majority | | 529 | 59.77 | |

=== Newton ===
Newton (2 seats)
| Party | Candidate | Votes | % | ±% |
|---|---|---|---|---|
| Conservative | Tom Parry | 1,432 | 22.01 | |
| Conservative | Adrian Walmsley | 1,415 | 21.75 | |
| Labour | Frank Baker | 1,063 | 16.34 | |
| Labour | Jenny Baker | 1,042 | 16.02 | |
| Liberal Democrats | Mark Williams | 674 | 10.36 | |
| Liberal Democrats | Neil Christian | 643 | 9.88 | |
| UKIP | Steven Woolfe | 237 | 3.64 | |

=== Parkgate ===
Parkgate (1 seat)
| Party | Candidate | Votes | % | ±% |
|---|---|---|---|---|
| Conservative | Brenda Dowding | 1,085 | 66.77 | |
| Labour | Susan Davies | 393 | 24.18 | |
| Liberal Democrats | Richard Farrance | 147 | 9.05 | |

=== Rossmore ===
Rossmore (1 seat)
| Party | Candidate | Votes | % | ±% |
|---|---|---|---|---|
| Labour | Pat Merrick | 467 | 50.87 | |
| Socialist Labour | Kenny Spain | 251 | 27.34 | |
| Conservative | John Wilson | 200 | 21.79 | |

=== Saughall and Mollington ===
Saughall and Mollington (1 seat)
| Party | Candidate | Votes | % | ±% |
|---|---|---|---|---|
| Conservative | Brian Crowe | 917 | 46.74 | |
| Independent | Andrew Storrar | 705 | 35.93 | |
| Labour | Janet Black | 340 | 17.33 | |

=== Shakerley ===
Shakerley (1 seat)
| Party | Candidate | Votes | % | ±% |
|---|---|---|---|---|
| Conservative | Mark Stocks | 913 | 66.40 | |
| Labour | Eira Bowden | 324 | 23.56 | |
| Liberal Democrats | Patricia Higgins | 138 | 10.04 | |

=== St Paul's ===
St Paul's (2 seats)
| Party | Candidate | Votes | % | ±% |
|---|---|---|---|---|
| Labour | Angela Claydon | 1,496 | 32.56 | |
| Labour | Ben Powell | 1,329 | 28.92 | |
| Conservative | Brian Anderson | 760 | 16.54 | |
| Conservative | Richard Soper | 615 | 13.38 | |
| UKIP | Andrew Roberts | 231 | 5.03 | |
| Liberal Democrats | Joan Butcher | 164 | 3.57 | |

=== Strawberry ===
Strawberry (1 seat)
| Party | Candidate | Votes | % | ±% |
|---|---|---|---|---|
| Labour | Mark Henesy | 962 | 49.79 | |
| Conservative | Nicholas Hebson | 848 | 43.89 | |
| Liberal Democrats | Hilary Chrusciezl | 122 | 6.31 | |

=== Sutton ===
Sutton (2 seats)
| Party | Candidate | Votes | % | ±% |
|---|---|---|---|---|
| Labour | Paul Donovan | 2,002 | 38.66 | |
| Labour | Nicole Meardon | 1,672 | 32.28 | |
| Conservative | Kimberley Anderson | 757 | 14.62 | |
| Conservative | Nicholas Lacey | 560 | 10.81 | |
| Liberal Democrats | Graham Handley | 188 | 3.63 | |

=== Tarporley ===
Tarporley (1 seat)
| Party | Candidate | Votes | % | ±% |
|---|---|---|---|---|
| Conservative | Eveleigh Moore Dutton | 1,313 | 73.93 | |
| Labour | Ann Pearce | 279 | 15.71 | |
| Liberal Democrats | Jo Gaskill | 184 | 10.36 | |

=== Tarvin and Kelsall ===
Tarvin and Kelsall (2 seats)
| Party | Candidate | Votes | % | ±% |
|---|---|---|---|---|
| Conservative | John Leather | 1,707 | 30.15 | |
| Conservative | Hugo Deynem | 1,530 | 27.03 | |
| Independent | Barbara Roberts | 847 | 14.96 | |
| Liberal Democrats | Raymond Williams | 671 | 11.85 | |
| Labour | Christine Davies | 495 | 8.74 | |
| Labour | Sandra Rudd | 411 | 7.26 | |

=== Tattenhall ===
Tattenhall (1 seat)
| Party | Candidate | Votes | % | ±% |
|---|---|---|---|---|
| Conservative | Mike Jones | 1,197 | 67.21 | |
| Labour | John Vernon | 300 | 16.84 | |
| Liberal Democrats | Vera Roberts | 284 | 15.95 | |

=== Upton ===
Upton (2 seats)
| Party | Candidate | Votes | % | ±% |
|---|---|---|---|---|
| Conservative | Jill Houlbrook | 1,735 | 27.54 | |
| Conservative | Hilarie McNae | 1,527 | 24.24 | |
| Labour | Yvonne Gibson | 1,113 | 17.67 | |
| Labour | Ian Gibson | 1,024 | 16.25 | |
| Liberal Democrats | Jean Evans | 587 | 9.32 | |
| Liberal Democrats | Elizabeth Jewkes | 314 | 4.98 | |

=== Weaver and Cuddington ===
Weaver and Cuddington (3 seats)
| Party | Candidate | Votes | % | ±% |
|---|---|---|---|---|
| Conservative | Charles Fifield | 1,972 | 16.26 | |
| Conservative | John Grimshaw | 1,823 | 15.03 | |
| Conservative | Alan McKie | 1,519 | 12.53 | |
| Liberal Democrats | Val Godfrey | 1,406 | 11.59 | |
| Independent | Gillian Edwards | 1,299 | 10.71 | |
| Labour | Derek Bowden | 977 | 8.06 | |
| Labour | Robert Cernik | 912 | 7.52 | |
| Labour | Val Armstrong | 863 | 7.12 | |
| Liberal Democrats | Peter Hampson | 762 | 6.28 | |
| Liberal Democrats | Sybil Turner | 594 | 4.90 | |

=== Whitby ===
Whitby (2 seats)
| Party | Candidate | Votes | % | ±% |
|---|---|---|---|---|
| Labour | Brian Jones | 1,489 | 28.64 | |
| Conservative | Bob Crompton | 1,180 | 22.70 | |
| Labour | Abdul Jilani | 1,175 | 22.60 | |
| Conservative | Kathy Lord | 1,130 | 21.73 | |
| Liberal Democrats | Kurt Jewkes | 225 | 4.33 | |

=== Willaston and Thornton ===
Willaston and Thornton (1 seat)
| Party | Candidate | Votes | % | ±% |
|---|---|---|---|---|
| Conservative | Myles Hogg | 1,396 | 78.96 | |
| Labour | Lynn Clare | 276 | 15.61 | |
| Liberal Democrats | Trish Derraugh | 96 | 5.43 | |

=== Winnington and Castle ===
Winnington and Castle (2 seats)
| Party | Candidate | Votes | % | ±% |
|---|---|---|---|---|
| Labour | Paul Dolan | 1,041 | 27.11 | |
| Labour | Amy Mercer-Bailey | 995 | 25.91 | |
| Conservative | Kate Birtwistle | 744 | 19.38 | |
| Conservative | Terry Birtwistle | 704 | 18.33 | |
| Liberal Democrats | Paul Carter | 205 | 5.34 | |
| BNP | Jon Westerby | 151 | 3.93 | |

=== Winsford Over and Verdin ===
Winsford Over and Verdin (3 seats)
| Party | Candidate | Votes | % | ±% |
|---|---|---|---|---|
| Labour | Don Beckett | 1,152 | 13.64 | |
| Labour | Tom Blackmore | 1,167 | 13.81 | |
| Conservative | Lynda Jones | 1,106 | 13.09 | |
| Conservative | Mark Garratt | 1,099 | 13.01 | |
| Labour | Mike Burns | 1,077 | 12.75 | |
| Conservative | Susan Kaur | 959 | 11.35 | |
| Liberal Democrats | Des Worthington | 712 | 8.43 | |
| Liberal Democrats | Charlie Parkinson | 626 | 7.41 | |
| Liberal Democrats | Brandon Parkey | 550 | 6.51 | |

=== Winsford Swanlow and Dene ===
Winsford Swanlow and Dene (2 seats)
| Party | Candidate | Votes | % | ±% |
|---|---|---|---|---|
| Labour | Stephen Burns | 899 | 20.26 | |
| Labour | David Armstrong | 817 | 18.41 | |
| Liberal Democrats | Malcolm Gaskill | 744 | 16.77 | |
| Conservative | Sue Langley | 681 | 15.35 | |
| Liberal Democrats | Bob Barton | 679 | 15.30 | |
| Conservative | Stacey Collister | 617 | 13.91 | |

=== Winsford Wharton ===
Winsford Wharton (2 seats)
| Party | Candidate | Votes | % | ±% |
|---|---|---|---|---|
| Labour | Brian Clarke | 1,119 | 28.07 | |
| Labour | Pamela Booher | 1,110 | 27.84 | |
| Conservative | Margaret Dolphin | 611 | 15.32 | |
| Conservative | Stephen Lorriman | 573 | 14.37 | |
| Liberal Democrats | Bev Theron | 332 | 8.33 | |
| Liberal Democrats | Janet Fitzmaurice | 242 | 6.07 | |

=== Witton and Rudheath ===
Witton and Rudheath (2 seats)
| Party | Candidate | Votes | % | ±% |
|---|---|---|---|---|
| Labour | Tony Lawrenson | 1,319 | 33.63 | |
| Labour | Julia Tickridge | 1,071 | 27.31 | |
| Conservative | George Miller | 751 | 19.15 | |
| Conservative | Nick Goulding | 639 | 16.29 | |
| Liberal Democrats | Graham Newton | 142 | 3.62 | |
