= 2008 Cheshire West and Chester Council election =

2008 UK local government election

Cheshire West and Chester Council Election, 2008
1 May 2008	2011 →

All 72 seats on Cheshire West and Chester Council 37 seats needed for a majority
	First party	Second party	Third party
Party	Conservative	Labour	Liberal Democrats
Seats won	55	13	4
Popular vote	136,487	59,851	43,543
Percentage	54.0%	23.7%	17.2%
- Results of the 2008 Cheshire West and Chester Council election

Elections to the newly created Cheshire West and Chester Council took place on 1 May 2008. Elections occurred in all 24 wards, with each ward returning 3 councillors to the council. The wards are identical to the former Cheshire County Council wards.

From May 2008 until April 2009, the elected members formed a "shadow" council, which made preparations for the changeover from the county and borough structure to the new unitary authority structure. Thereafter, the members would serve for two years from May 2009. The next elections were held in May 2011.

== Results summary ==
Seats
1. Conservative (76.4%)
2. Labour (18.1%)
3. Liberal Democrats (5.60%)
Vote share
1. Conservative (54.0%)
2. Labour (23.7%)
3. Liberal Democrats (17.2%)
4. UKIP (1.40%)
5. Green (0.60%)
6. English Democrats (0.40%)
7. BNP (0.30%)
8. Independent and others (2.30%)

The Conservative Party took control of the council, with a majority of 38 councillors.

After the election, the composition of the council was;

- Conservative 55
- Labour 13
- Liberal Democrat 4

Cheshire West and Chester Council election – 2008 – summary
Party	Seats	Gains	Losses	Net gain/loss	Seats %	Votes %	Votes	+/−
Conservative	55				76.4	54.0	136,487	
Labour	13				18.1	23.7	59,851	
Liberal Democrats	4				5.6	17.2	43,543	
UKIP	0				0.0	1.4	3,646	
Green	0				0.0	0.6	1,584	
English Democrat	0				0.0	0.4	1,038	
BNP	0				0.0	0.3	880	
Independent and others	0				0.0	2.3	5,902	

== Results by ward ==
=== Abbey ===
Abbey (3 seats)
Party	Candidate	Votes	%	±%
Conservative	Herbert Manley	2353		
Conservative	Keith Musgrave	2309		
Conservative	Jan Mashlan	2203		
Liberal Democrats	Arthur Wood	1136		
Labour	Katherine Green	574		
Labour	Derek Bowden	533		
Labour	Robert Harmston	506		

=== Blacon ===
Blacon (3 seats)
Party	Candidate	Votes	%	±%
Labour	Reggie Jones	1417		
Labour	Marie Nelson	1364		
Labour	Alex Tate	1188		
Conservative	Charlie Powell	904		
Conservative	Robert Blacker	885		
Conservative	Neil Sullivan	826		
UKIP	David Evans	238		
Liberal Democrats	Timothy Longman	232		
Liberal Democrats	Sandy Clyne	225		
UKIP	Allan Weddell	214		
Liberal Democrats	Kenn Hodd	193		

=== Boughton Heath and Vicars Cross ===
Boughton Heath and Vicars Cross (3 seats)
Party	Candidate	Votes	%	±%
Conservative	Mark Williams	2576		
Conservative	Pamela Hall	2535		
Conservative	Keith Board	2448		
Liberal Democrats	Mia Jones	1519		
Liberal Democrats	James Latham	1505		
Liberal Democrats	Lizzie Jewkes	1172		
Labour	Sara Barnsley	472		
Labour	Peter Barnard	411		
Labour	Linda Webb	386		
UKIP	Peter Lowe	362		
Green	Jane Fisher	309		
English Democrat	Ed Abrams	290		
UKIP	Michael Roberts	270		

=== Broxton ===
Broxton (3 seats)
Party	Candidate	Votes	%	±%
Conservative	Neil Ritchie	2770		
Conservative	Michael Jones	2640		
Conservative	Ann Wright	2637		
Liberal Democrats	Paul Roberts	1018		
Liberal Democrats	David Evans	691		
Liberal Democrats	Gillian Jordan	674		
English Democrat	David Roberts	281		
Labour	Nicholas Dixon	237		
Labour	Anna Bunt	222		
Labour	Noel Hutchinson	194		
UKIP	Geoffrey Stevenson	192		

=== Central and Westminster ===
Central and Westminster (3 seats)
Party	Candidate	Votes	%	±%
Labour	Derek Bateman	1178		
Labour	Lynn Clare	1083		
Labour	Justin Madders	1021		
Independent	Jonathan Starkey	596		
Conservative	Graham Heatley	499		
Independent	Henny Moore	477		
English Democrat	Maurice Brookes	467		
Conservative	Anne Hughes	460		
Independent	John Wilson	442		
Conservative	Thomas Hughes	440		

=== City ===
City (3 seats)
Party	Candidate	Votes	%	±%
Conservative	Richard Lowe	1407		
Conservative	Tom Parry	1396		
Conservative	Max Drury	1358		
Labour	Sandra Rudd	1270		
Labour	Bob Rudd	1259		
Labour	Brendan Doyle	1229		
Liberal Democrats	David Mead	765		
Liberal Democrats	Neil Christian	652		
Liberal Democrats	David Simpson	594		
UKIP	David Scott	166		

=== Eddisbury ===
Eddisbury (3 seats)
Party	Candidate	Votes	%	±%
Conservative	Andrew Needham	2739		
Conservative	Barbara Roberts	2620		
Conservative	John Grimshaw	2558		
Liberal Democrats	Val Godfrey	1704		
Labour	David Speak	440		
Labour	Mark Green	418		
Labour	Nonny Shearer	410		

=== Frodsham and Helsby ===
Frodsham and Helsby (3 seats)
Party	Candidate	Votes	%	±%
Conservative	Leslie Ford	2303		
Conservative	Andrew Dawson	2254		
Conservative	Mark Ingram	2182		
Labour	Brian Lloyd	1389		
Labour	John Beech	1149		
Labour	Alec Robertson	1036		
Liberal Democrats	Joan Laming	641		
Independent	Frank Pennington	528		
Independent	Tom Reynolds	395		

=== Gowy ===
Gowy (3 seats)
Party	Candidate	Votes	%	±%
Conservative	Brian Bailey	3185		
Conservative	Hugo Deynem	3154		
Conservative	Stuart Parker	3098		
Liberal Democrats	Alison Anson	1254		
Liberal Democrats	Raymond Williams	1234		
Liberal Democrats	Harry Ziman	1156		
Labour	Paul Cornwell	477		
Labour	Tony Pegrum	440		
Labour	Stephen Davies	430		
Green	Tom Barker	353		
UKIP	John Lodge	248		

=== Grange and Rossmore ===
Grange and Rossmore (3 seats)
Party	Candidate	Votes	%	±%
Labour	Tony Sherlock	1290		
Labour	Angela Claydon	1272		
Labour	Pat Merrick	1101		
Conservative	Michael English	1062		
Conservative	Graham Howell	1022		
Conservative	Susie Knapton-McMillan	880		
Liberal Democrats	Kate Pemberton	505		

=== Groves and Whitby ===
Groves and Whitby (3 seats)
Party	Candidate	Votes	%	±%
Conservative	Linda Cooper	1992		
Conservative	Brian Anderson	1932		
Conservative	Katherine Lord	1855		
Labour	Mark Henesy	1174		
Labour	Brian Jones	1157		
Labour	Peter Robson	1046		
Liberal Democrats	Hilary Chrusciezl	604		

=== Hoole and Newton ===
Hoole and Newton (3 seats)
Party	Candidate	Votes	%	±%
Conservative	John Ebo	1706		
Conservative	Adrian Walmsley	1604		
Liberal Democrats	Bob Thompson	1548		
Liberal Democrats	David Hull	1546		
Liberal Democrats	Ruth Chidlow	1545		
Conservative	Margaret Parker	1545		
Labour	Alex Black	704		
Labour	Janet Black	645		
Labour	Philip Tate	498		
Green	Diana Wilderspin-Jones	382		
UKIP	Stephen Nichols	168		

=== Ledsham and Willaston ===
Ledsham and Willaston (3 seats)
Party	Candidate	Votes	%	±%
Conservative	Myles Hogg	2531		
Conservative	Gareth Anderson	2411		
Conservative	Graham Smith	2293		
Labour	Catherine Sherlock	664		
Labour	Ted Lloyd	637		
Labour	Jamie Merrick	598		
Liberal Democrats	Graham Handley	580		
UKIP	Geoffrey Gregory	352		

=== Marbury ===
Marbury (3 seats)
Party	Candidate	Votes	%	±%
Conservative	Malcolm Byram	1971		
Conservative	Norman Wright	1969		
Conservative	Keith Wilson	1696		
Liberal Democrats	Charles Garton	1398		
Liberal Democrats	Annie Makepeace	1237		
Liberal Democrats	John Turnbull	1137		
Labour	Jeff Langham	525		
Labour	Gill Gough	440		
Labour	Danny Maguire	385		

=== Mickle Trafford ===
Mickle Trafford (3 seats)
Party	Candidate	Votes	%	±%
Conservative	Eleanor Johnson	2737		
Conservative	Brian Crowe	2724		
Conservative	Andrew Storrar	2694		
Labour	Tony Mills	667		
Labour	Richard Small	658		
Labour	Christine Lloyd	649		
Liberal Democrats	David Robinson	435		
Liberal Democrats	Kurt Jewkes	367		
Liberal Democrats	Sian Jorgensen	323		
UKIP	Nicholas Nichols	294		
UKIP	Andrew Pettigrew	251		

=== Neston and Parkgate ===
Neston and Parkgate (3 seats)
Party	Candidate	Votes	%	±%
Conservative	Brenda Dowding	2549		
Conservative	Kay Loch	2353		
Conservative	William Mealor	2509		
Labour	Louise Gittins	1267		
Labour	Andy Williams	1174		
Liberal Democrats	Derek Gaskell	1105		
Labour	Abdul Jilani	1095		
Liberal Democrats	Tom Marlow	998		
Liberal Democrats	Michael Shipman	830		
UKIP	Henry Crocker	361		

=== Northwich East and Shakerley ===
Northwich East and Shakerley (3 seats)
Party	Candidate	Votes	%	±%
Conservative	George Miller	1562		
Conservative	Terry Birtwistle	1469		
Conservative	Mark Stocks	1312		
Labour	Tony Lawrenson	920		
Labour	George Mainwaring	864		
Labour	Steve Gough	856		
BNP	Jon Westerby	529		
Liberal Democrats	Wendy Jones	388		
Liberal Democrats	Brian Plant	323		

=== Northwich West ===
Northwich West (3 seats)
Party	Candidate	Votes	%	±%
Conservative	Helen Weltman	1529		
Conservative	Kate Birtwistle	1526		
Conservative	Simon McDonald	1473		
Labour	Helen Burder	1015		
Labour	Arthur Neil	939		
Labour	Paul Dolan	898		
Liberal Democrats	Glyn Roberts	694		
Green	Howard Thorp	540		
Liberal Democrats	Jo Gaskill	537		

=== Overleigh ===
Overleigh (3 seats)
Party	Candidate	Votes	%	±%
Conservative	Richard Short	3149		
Conservative	Arthur Harada	3093		
Conservative	Razia Daniels	3063		
Labour	Ruth Davidson	1523		
Labour	Jane Mercer	1360		
Labour	Jason Stiles	1265		
Liberal Democrats	Annie Mead	573		
UKIP	Wendy Moore	349		

=== Sutton and Manor ===
Sutton and Manor (3 seats)
Party	Candidate	Votes	%	±%
Conservative	Kimberley Anderson	1425		
Labour	Paul Donovan	1324		
Conservative	Robert Crompton	1314		
Conservative	Nicholas Hebson	1279		
Labour	Cherie Hill	1148		
Labour	Sue Pugh	1121		
Liberal Democrats	Joanna Pemberton	516		

=== Upton ===
Upton (3 seats)
Party	Candidate	Votes	%	±%
Conservative	Jill Houlbrook	2598		
Conservative	Pat Lott	2411		
Conservative	Hilarie McNae	2398		
Liberal Democrats	Rob Jordan	1137		
Liberal Democrats	Michael Main	1076		
Liberal Democrats	Vera Roberts	822		
Labour	Gerald Grant	701		
Labour	Peter Black	655		
Labour	Mil Williams	596		
UKIP	John Moore	181		

=== Weaver ===
Weaver ward (3 seats)
Party	Candidate	Votes	%	±%
Conservative	Ralph Oultram	1927		
Conservative	Lynn Riley	1668		
Conservative	Alan McKie	1617		
Independent	Nora Dolphin	1109		
Independent	Frank Dolphin	1009		
Independent	Doug Shingler	893		
Labour	Brian Jamieson	622		
Liberal Democrats	Ailsa Gaskill-Jones	621		
Labour	Graham Clark	575		
Labour	Eira Bowden	523		
Independent	John Freeman	453		
Liberal Democrats	George England	341		
Liberal Democrats	Andrew Hyde	265		

=== Winsford North and East ===
Winsford North and East (3 seats)
Party	Candidate	Votes	%	±%
Labour	Pamela Booher	993		
Labour	Brian Clarke	971		
Labour	Donald Beckett	955		
Conservative	Jon Jones	894		
Conservative	Frank Middleton	849		
Conservative	Saundra Middleton	828		
Liberal Democrats	Des Worthington	793		
Liberal Democrats	Pete Gannon	747		
Liberal Democrats	Bev Theron	687		

=== Winsford South and West ===
Winsford South and West (3 seats)
Party	Candidate	Votes	%	±%
Liberal Democrats	Bob Barton	1211		
Liberal Democrats	Charlie Parkinson	1152		
Liberal Democrats	Malcolm Gaskill	1137		
Conservative	Ann Lacey	840		
Conservative	Bill Hall	834		
Conservative	Deborah Deynem	655		
Labour	Tom Blackmore	581		
Labour	Jill McQuaid	552		
Labour	Derek Wright	515		
BNP	Philip Williams	351		
