= 2015 Cheshire West and Chester Council election =

2015 UK local government election

Cheshire West and Chester Council election, 2015
- 7 May 2015

All 75 seats on Cheshire West and Chester Council 38 seats needed for a majority
- Turnout: 68.2% (▲24.7%)

	First party	Second party
Leader	Samantha Dixon	Mike Jones
Party	Labour	Conservative
Leader's seat	Chester City	Tattenhall
Last election	32 seats, 37.38%	42 seats, 45.34%
Seats before	32	42
Seats won	38	36
Seat change	▲6	▼6
Popular vote	115,473	120,477
Percentage	38.09%	39.74%
Swing	▲0.71%	▼5.6%
	Third party	Fourth party
Leader		Bob Thompson (Note: As the only Liberal Democrat councillor, Thompson was their de facto group leader but did not stand for re-election, no candidates from the party were subsequently elected.)
Party	Independent	Liberal Democrats
Leader's seat		Did not stand
Last election	0 seats, 3.07%	1 seat, 11.9%
Seats before	0	1
Seats won	1	0
Seat change	▲1	▼1
Popular vote	6,104	23,887
Percentage	2.01%	7.88%
Swing	▼1.06%	▼4.02%
- Colours denote winning party. Striped wards have mixed representation.
Leader of the Council before election
Mike Jones
Conservative
Leader of the Council after election
Samantha Dixon
Labour

The 2015 Cheshire West and Chester Council election took place on 7 May 2015, electing members of Cheshire West and Chester Council in England. This was on the same day as other local elections across the country as well as the general election.

All 75 seats were contested. Labour won a small majority with a total of 38 seats on a 3.2% swing from the Conservatives, meaning that the council moved from Conservative control to Labour control.

Cheshire West and Chester was the only council to change hands in this way in the 2015 elections, and this unique result has been variously attributed to public dissatisfaction with fracking in the area, local planning issues, the organisation and leadership of the local parties, and to a generally difficult climate for Conservatives in the area. In addition, the only Liberal Democrat (Lib Dem) seat on the council was lost, while an independent was elected to the Parkgate ward. No other minor party won a seat, but both the Green Party and United Kingdom Independence Party (UKIP) fielded large numbers of candidates and saw significant positive swings. Labour's Samantha Dixon became the first woman to lead the council, while the previous leader Mike Jones survived a Conservative leadership challenge and became Leader of the Opposition.

== Background ==
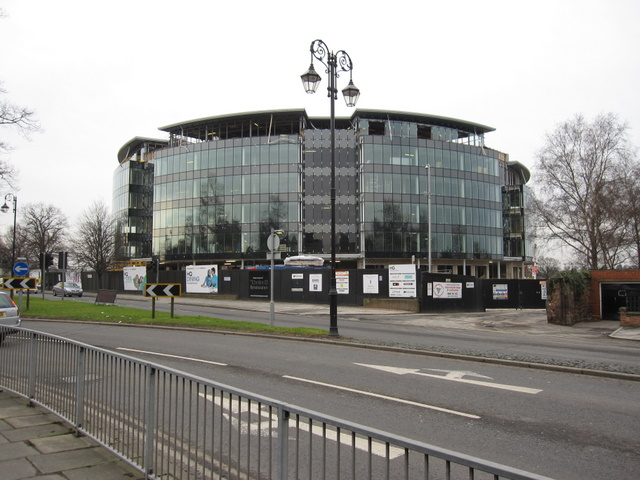
HQ, the headquarters of Cheshire West and Chester Council

Cheshire West and Chester (CWaC) had been governed since its formation in 2009 by the Conservative Party. However, the Conservatives lost seats in CWaC against the national trend at the 2011 local election, and the Chester area was identified by The Economist before the election as a challenging area for the party. The election also took place at an especially bad period nationally for the Liberal Democrats, who lost 310 councillors in England at the previous local elections, and at a period of growth for other minor parties – especially UKIP, who won the CWaC council area in the 2014 European Parliament elections and were identified by the BBC as potential spoiler candidates. Although there were several by-elections in the 2011–2015 term, the number of councillors representing each party did not change over the course of the council.

In total, there were 75 Conservative candidates, 75 Labour candidates, 45 Green candidates, 43 Liberal Democrat candidates, 33 UKIP candidates, 4 TUSC candidates, 1 Socialist Labour candidate and 9 candidates running as independents. Of the incumbents, 14 did not seek re-election, including several parliamentary candidates: Bob Thompson, formerly the only Lib Dem on the council, stood for Parliament in City of Chester; the former Labour councillor Julia Tickridge stood in Weaver Vale; and Justin Madders, previous leader of the Labour group, stood in and was elected to Ellesmere Port and Neston.

== Election proceedings ==
Turnout by ward, from lowest (darkest) to highest (lightest)

The Statement of Persons Nominated was published on Friday 10 April 2015. The election took place on 7 May 2015, on the same day as the general election, various parish council elections, town council elections in Frodsham, Neston, Northwich and Winsford, and a referendum on town planning in Malpas. As is standard for council elections in England, first-past-the-post voting was used in single seat wards, and block voting was used in multi-seat wards. All 75 seats on the CWaC council were up for election. Of around 34,000 postal ballots issued, about 1,300 papers for Frodsham and the Garden Quarter district of Chester were voided and re-issued due to a printing error that removed the party emblems of some candidates, and 284 were not delivered in time for the election. An attack leaflet targeted at Labour leader Samantha Dixon was distributed to Chester city centre residents on the day of the election which lacked printing details and may have contained "incorrect information", in violation of the Representation of the People Act 1983. Cheshire Police confirmed that they were investigating the leaflet.

The count for the parliamentary election to City of Chester took priority, and so the count for CWaC began on at 2 PM, 8 May. The count took place at Northgate Arena, and ended up running through the whole of the allotted 9-hour day without a decisive result. The count was suspended on a "cliffhanger", with Labour and the Conservatives tied at 36 seats each after a recount was called on the two decisive two-seat ward of Newton. The count resumed on 9 May, and after a quick "bundle recount" suggested a Labour lead, the Conservative Party asked for a full recount, lasting another three and a half hours. The second recount revealed that Labour's Gill Watson led by 34 votes over the incumbent Adrian Walmsley in the final seat. The final result was delivered at 5.30 PM on 9 May 2015 after 14 hours of counting.

Seats
1. Labour (50.7%)
2. Conservative (48.0%)
3. Independent (1.30%)
Vote share
1. Conservative (36.7%)
2. Labour (34.8%)
3. Lib Dem (9.77%)
4. UKIP (9.22%)
5. Green (6.34%)
6. Independent & other (3.26%)

The final results saw the Conservatives retain the largest share of the popular vote, but with a smaller proportion than at the previous election. Labour gained 6 seats (5 from Conservative, 1 from Lib Dem), the Conservatives lost 6 seats (5 to Labour, 1 to independent) and the Lib Dems lost their only seat in Hoole to Labour. Labour therefore won an absolute majority, with 38 seats to the Conservatives 36 on the 75 seat council. This made CWaC the only council in the entire country to transfer from Conservative to Labour control at the 2015 elections, (Note: Although CWaC elects all members at once every four years, many councils elect members in thirds and have more frequent elections. This means that although CWaC was the only council to transfer directly from Labour to Conservative control at the 2015 elections, it was not the only one to change hands this way between 2011 and 2015. Labour also gained two councils – Stockton-on-Tees Borough Council and West Lancashire Borough Council – from no overall control at the 2015 elections. West Lancashire was also held by the Conservatives at the 2011 election, but elects its representatives in thirds. This means there were other elections intervening, and West Lancashire went into no overall control at the 2014 local election. In addition, Crawley, Derbyshire, Dudley, Harlow, Nottinghamshire, Redditch and Southampton were gained by Labour from Conservative control at some point between the 2011 and 2014 local elections and held at the 2015 elections.) a result that was described by ConservativeHome as a "catastrophic loss" and by the Chester Chronicle as "deeply embarrassing" for the local Conservative Party.

No minor parties won any seats, but UKIP and the Greens saw large positive swings both across the borough and in individual wards, including a 9% swing to UKIP in Blacon and a 17.5% swing to the Greens in Garden Quarter, where they finished second.

Summary of the 2015 Cheshire West and Chester Council election results
Political party	Group leader	Candidates	Total votes	Total seats	Seats gained	Seats lost	Seats, net change	Seats, of total (%)	Votes, of total (%)	Total votes, change (%)
Conservative	Mike Jones	75	68,580	36	0	6	▼6	48.0	36.7	▼7.5
Labour	Samantha Dixon	75	64,996	38	6	0	▲6	50.7	34.7	▼0.6
Liberal Democrats	Bob Thompson (Note: As the only Liberal Democrat councillor, Thompson was their de facto group leader but did not stand for re-election, no candidates from the party were subsequently elected.)	43	18,273	0	0	1	▼1	0.0	9.8	▼3.5
UKIP	—N/a	33	17,240	0	0	0	Steady	0.0	9.2	▲7.3
Green	—N/a	45	11,867	0	0	0	Steady	0.0	6.3	▲5.4
Independent	—N/a (Note: As the only independent elected to the council, Martin Barker became the de facto independent group leader.)	9	5,627	1	1	0	▲1	1.3	3.0	▼1.0
Socialist Labour	—N/a	1	286	0	0	0	Steady	0.0	0.2	Steady
TUSC	—N/a	4	184	0	0	0	Steady	0.0	0.1	New
Total		285	187,053	75	-	-	-	Turnout	68.2	-

Seat composition between 2011 (top) and 2015 (bottom):

42	32	1

38	36	1

In all, there were 22 new councillors to CWaC council – 12 from Labour, 9 from the Conservatives and one independent. Local Labour leader Samantha Dixon became the council leader, making her the first woman to hold the role, while former council leader Mike Jones remained leader of the Conservative group despite a leadership challenge.

Following the election, the first council meeting under Labour control took place on 21 May 2015. The new administration significantly restructured the council: the existing scrutiny committees were merged while new local committees were established for Chester, Ellesmere Port, Northwich and Winsford, and rural Cheshire, and the roles of Lord Mayor of Chester and chair of the council were separated. This meant that the casting vote remained with former Lord Mayor, Bob Rudd (Labour), instead of the new Lord Mayor, Hugo Deynem (Conservative), which Conservatives criticized for politicizing the role. The new overview and scrutiny committee was arranged on a nonpartisan basis, with equal numbers of Labour and Conservative members and the casting vote given to the independent Martin Barker.

== Reactions and analysis ==
Butler swing from 2011

Labour/Conservative swing by ward

Largest party/second party swing by ward

As leader of the only Labour group to take control of a former Conservative council at the elections, Samantha Dixon described her local party as "a little ray of hope in the North West" but warned that it would be difficult to operate Labour policies under a national Conservative majority government, and proposed a more consensual cross-party approach to running the council. The outgoing Conservative leader, Mike Jones, suggested that a Labour majority of just one would decrease private sector confidence in the council.

Fracking was noted by both the Chester Chronicle and BBC News as a politically hot topic in Cheshire, particularly around Upton where one gas company had planning permission for a drilling site, and the Conservative loss was partly attributed to community fears about the practice. Matt Bryan, an anti-fracking Labour candidate in Upton unseated the sitting Conservative councillor in what the Chester Chronicle described as arguably "the biggest poll shock". The Labour MP for City of Chester, Chris Matheson, who had similarly defeated the incumbent Stephen Mosley against the national trend, described unhappiness with fracking planning permission procedures and planning more generally as key issues that had helped Labour locally.

The loss of the safe Conservative seat of Parkgate to the independent Martin Barker was also described as a "surprise" by AboutMyArea. Barker stood on a platform of localism for Parkgate and his victory was attributed by the site to dissatisfaction with the choice of Conservative candidate, who lived outside Parkgate in Mickle Trafford.

On taking office, Dixon credited the result to a "positive campaign" by the Labour Party rather than any mistakes by the Conservative Party. However, Private Eye's "Rotten Boroughs" column blamed "own goals" by Jones – such as removing the planning committee chairperson and withdrawing the party whip from councillors who voted against developments that Jones supported, insulting members of the public, and removing a respect clause from the council constitution – for having "handed victory to Labour". There was similar criticism from ConservativeHome, whose correspondent accused Jones of behaving "in a way which allowed our opponents to paint us as dodgy, or even corrupt", and from councillor Mark Stocks, who launched an unsuccessful leadership challenge against Jones, saying:

"As the only council in the entire country to make the transition from Conservative to Labour, someone has to take the responsibility for what must be considered a monumental defeat. This responsibility has to start at the top. For me, it is an unavoidable belief that with proper leadership, Cheshire West and Chester would have followed the national trend and remained under Conservative control."

Jones, supported by other Conservative councillors, rejected this suggestion, noting the fact that the local Conservative Party had taken the largest share of the popular vote at the council election and retained the parliamentary seat of Weaver Vale against opinion poll predictions. When looked at this way, Jones said, the result "does not seem like a catastrophe".

== Results ==
=== Councillor changes ===
==== New councillors ====
- Val Armstrong (Labour, Witton)
- Martin Barker (Independent, Parkgate)
- Michael Baynham (Conservative, Winsford Over and Verdin)
- Richard Beacham (Labour, Newton)
- Robert Bisset (Labour, St Paul's)
- Matt Bryan (Labour, Upton)
- Angie Chidley (Labour, Hoole)
- Jess Crook (Labour, Ellesmere Port Town)
- Carol Gahan (Labour, Blacon)
- Lynn Gibbon (Conservative, Marbury)
- Nige Jones (Conservative, Little Neston and Burton)
- Susan Kaur (Conservative, Hartford and Greenbank)
- Jane Mercer (Labour, Lache)
- Patricia Parkes (Conservative, Hartford and Greenbank)
- James Pearson (Conservative, Davenham and Moulton)
- Peter Rooney (Labour, Ledsham and Manor)
- Karen Shore (Labour, Whitby)
- Stephen Smith (Labour, Elton)
- Harry Tonge (Conservative, Weaver and Cuddington)
- Gill Watson (Labour, Newton)
- Chris Whitehurst (Conservative, Malpas)
- Paul Williams (Conservative, Weaver and Cuddington)

==== Outgoing councillors ====
- Keith Butcher (Labour) (Note: Did not stand for election.)
- Malcolm Byram (Conservative)
- Robert Crompton (Conservative)
- Brenda Dowding (Conservative)
- Les Ford (Conservative)
- Carolyn Graham (Labour)
- John Grimshaw (Conservative)
- Graham Heatley (Conservative)
- Mark Henesy (Labour)
- Lynda Jones (Conservative)
- Kay Loch (Conservative)
- Justin Madders (Labour)
- Herbert Manley (Conservative)
- Hilarie McNae (Conservative)
- Keith Musgrave (Conservative)
- Tom Parry (Conservative)
- Ben Powell (Labour)
- Alexandra Tate (Labour)
- Bob Thompson (Liberal Democrat)
- Julia Tickridge (Labour)
- Adrian Walmsley (Conservative)
- Elton Watson (Conservative)
- Ann Wright (Conservative)

==== Re-elected councillors ====
- Gareth Anderson (Conservative, Ledsham and Manor)
- David Armstrong (Labour, Winsford Swanlow and Deane)
- Don Beckett (Labour, Winsford Over and Verdin)
- Alex Black (Labour, Hoole)
- Tom Blackmore (Labour, Winsford Over and Verdin)
- Keith Board (Conservative, Great Boughton)
- Pamela Booher (Labour, Winsford Wharton)
- Stephen Burns (Labour, Winsford Swanlow and Deane)
- Lynn Clare (Labour, Ellesmere Port Town)
- Brian Clarke (Labour, Winsford Wharton)
- Angela Claydon (Labour, St Paul's)
- Brian Crowe (Conservative, Saughall and Mollington)
- Razia Daniels (Conservative, Handbridge Park)
- Andrew Dawson (Conservative, Frodsham)
- Martyn Delaney (Labour, Boughton)
- Hugo Deynem (Conservative, Tarvin and Kelsall)
- Samantha Dixon (Labour, Chester City)
- Paul Dolan (Labour, Winnington and Castle)
- Paul Donovan (Labour, Sutton)
- Charles Fifield (Conservative, Weaver and Cuddington)
- Howard Greenwood (Conservative, Farndon)
- Louise Gittins (Labour, Little Neston and Burton)
- Pamela Hall (Conservative, Great Boughton)
- Don Hammond (Conservative, Marbury)
- Myles Hogg (Conservative, Willaston and Thornton)
- Jill Houlbrook (Conservative, Upton)
- Eleanor Johnson (Conservative, Gowy)
- Brian Jones (Labour, Whitby)
- Mike Jones (Conservative, Tattenhall)
- Reggie Jones (Labour, Blacon)
- Tony Lawrenson (Labour, Witton)
- John Leather (Conservative, Tarvin and Kelsall)
- Alan McKie (Conservative, Helsby)
- Nicole Meardon (Labour, Sutton)
- Pat Merrick (Labour, Rossmore)
- Eveleigh Moore Dutton (Conservative, Tarporley)
- Sam Naylor (Labour, Winnington and Castle)
- Marie Nelson (Labour, Blacon)
- Ralph Oultram (Conservative, Kingsley)
- Margaret Parker (Conservative, Chester Villages)
- Stuart Parker (Conservative, Chester Villages)
- Lynn Riley (Conservative, Frodsham)
- Diane Roberts (Labour, Netherpool)
- Bob Rudd (Labour, Garden Quarter)
- Tony Sherlock (Labour, Grange)
- Gaynor Sinar (Conservative, Davenham and Moulton)
- Mark Stocks (Conservative, Shakerley)
- Neil Sullivan (Conservative, Handbridge Park)
- Helen Weltman (Conservative, Davenham and Moulton)
- Andrew Williams (Labour, Neston)
- Mark Williams (Conservative, Dodleston and Huntington)
- Norman Wright (Conservative, Marbury)

=== Seat changes ===
Conservative to Independent (1)

- Parkgate

Conservative to Labour (5)

- Elton
- Newton (2 seats)
- Upton (1 seat)
- Whitby (1 seat)

Liberal Democrat to Labour (1)

- Hoole (1 seat)

=== Results by ward ===
Vote share by ward

Conservative vote share by ward

Labour vote share by ward

Lib Dem vote share by ward

Green vote share by ward

UKIP vote share by ward

Independent and other vote share by ward

Turnout by ward
Ward	Turnout (%)
Blacon	61.2
Boughton	63.0
Chester City	63.5
Chester Villages	78.0
Davenham and Moulton	70.4
Dodleston and Huntington	77.3
Ellesmere Port Town	55.7
Elton	66.2
Farndon	74.5
Frodsham	71.4
Garden Quarter	58.6
Gowy	74.3
Grange	57.0
Great Boughton	76.1
Handbridge Park	76.0
Hartford and Greenbank	75.1
Helsby	73.5
Hoole	71.9
Kingsley	76.7
Lache	65.3
Ledsham and Manor	73.4
Little Neston and Burton	76.1
Malpas	70.0
Marbury	68.9
Neston	63.7
Netherpool	61.9
Newton	69.2
Parkgate	77.1
Rossmore	59.3
Saughall and Mollington	75.3
Shakerley	65.4
St Paul's	65.7
Strawberry	73.6
Sutton	67.2
Tarporley	75.0
Tarvin and Kelsall	73.7
Tattenhall	74.3
Upton	71.5
Weaver and Cuddington	71.3

==== Blacon ====
Blacon (3 seats)
Party	Candidate	Votes	%
Labour	Reginald Francis Jones	3,579	21.07
Labour	Marie Nelson	3,349	19.72
Labour	Carol Margaret Gahan	3,119	18.36
Conservative	Christian Philip Dunn	1,109	6.53
UKIP	Steve Ingram	1,054	6.21
UKIP	Chris Erskine	1,037	6.11
Conservative	Alexander Edward Roberts	979	5.76
Conservative	Jack Alex Jackson	941	5.54
UKIP	Liz Hutchison	805	4.74
Green	Christine Watson	482	2.84
Green	Zoe Marie Gorzelak	303	1.78
Green	Colin Drysdale Watson	227	1.34
Turnout		6,295	61.2
Labour hold			
Labour hold			
Labour hold			

==== Boughton ====
Boughton (1 seat)
Party	Candidate	Votes	%
Labour	Martyn Delaney	1,308	46.53
Conservative	Kate Elizabeth Vaughan	933	33.19
Green	Allison Clare Parkes	308	10.96
UKIP	Stephen Carter Nichols	262	9.32
Turnout		2,827	63.0
Labour hold			

==== Chester City ====
Chester City (1 seat)
Party	Candidate	Votes	%
Labour	Samantha Kate Dixon	909	47.52
Conservative	Carlotta Eva Dunn	607	31.73
Green	Andy Davidson	178	9.30
UKIP	Katie Erskine	125	6.53
Liberal Democrats	Noel McGlinchey	94	4.91
Turnout		1,928	63.5
Labour hold			

==== Chester Villages ====
Chester Villages (Christleton, Guilden Sutton, Mickle Trafford and Waverton), (2 seats)
Party	Candidate	Votes	%
Conservative	Margaret Phyllis Parker	2,744	28.04
Conservative	Stuart Parker	2,734	27.94
Labour	Steve Davies	1,241	12.68
Labour	Sandra Rudd	1,019	10.41
Liberal Democrats	Ian Hopkinson	587	6.00
UKIP	Paul Rees	585	5.98
Green	Paula Irene D'Arcy	536	5.48
Green	Darren James Burling	341	3.48
Turnout		5,430	78.0
Conservative hold			
Conservative hold			

==== Davenham and Moulton ====
Davenham and Moulton (3 seats)
Party	Candidate	Votes	%
Conservative	Helen Catherine Weltman	3,283	17.52
Conservative	James Pearson	3,262	17.41
Conservative	Gaynor Jean Sinar	2,971	15.86
Labour	Rebecca Cooper	2,417	12.90
Labour	Andrew Graham Cooper	2,316	12.36
Labour	Kyle McGregor	1,796	9.59
UKIP	Simon Gerald McDonald	1,040	5.55
UKIP	Glyn Roberts	854	4.56
Liberal Democrats	Pamela Joyce Gaskill	798	4.26
Turnout		7,421	70.4
Conservative hold			
Conservative hold			
Conservative hold			

==== Dodleston and Huntington ====
Dodleston and Huntington (1 seat)
Party	Candidate	Votes	%
Conservative	Mark Graham Williams	1,439	52.65
Labour	Jacky Creswick	717	26.23
Liberal Democrats	Christopher John Ward	321	11.75
UKIP	David S Evans	256	9.37
Turnout		2,748	77.3
Conservative hold			

==== Ellesmere Port Town ====
Ellesmere Port Town (2 seats)
Party	Candidate	Votes	%
Labour	Lynn Clare	2,386	36.03
Labour	Jess Crook	2,134	32.23
UKIP	Jeanette Starkey	802	12.11
Conservative	Gordon Douglas Meldrum	403	6.09
Conservative	Graham Pritchard	395	5.96
Green	Stefanie Anne Boyle	307	4.64
Green	James Douglas Benzie	195	2.94
Turnout		3,759	55.7
Labour hold			
Labour hold			

==== Elton ====
Elton (1 seat)
Party	Candidate	Votes	%
Labour	Stephen Robert Smith	1,224	53.13
Conservative	Graham Heatley	1,080	46.88
Turnout		2,335	66.2
Labour gain from Conservative			

==== Farndon ====
Farndon (1 seat)
Party	Candidate	Votes	%
Conservative	Howard Greenwood	1,138	45.59
Liberal Democrats	Paul David Roberts	990	39.66
Labour	Paul Alfred Cornwell	244	9.78
Green	Alexander James Clement	124	4.97
Turnout		2,504	74.5
Conservative hold			

==== Frodsham ====
Frodsham (2 seats)
Party	Candidate	Votes	%
Conservative	Andrew William Dawson	2,456	26.08
Conservative	Lynn Riley	2,178	23.13
Labour	Michael Garvey	1,435	15.24
Labour	Deborah Fletcher	1,305	13.86
	Michael John Pusey	493	5.24
Independent	Tom Reynolds	477	5.07
Green	Jonny Pendlebury	421	4.47
Green	Sue Beesley	409	4.34
Liberal Democrats	Vera Sandra Roberts	242	2.57
Turnout		5,321	71.4
Conservative hold			
Conservative hold			

==== Garden Quarter ====
Garden Quarter (1 seat)
Party	Candidate	Votes	%
Labour	Bob Rudd	953	40.9
Green	Catherine Green	802	34.5
Conservative	Ed Longe	491	21.1
Liberal Democrats	Chris Senior	82	3.5
Majority		151	6.4
Turnout		2,328	58.6
Labour hold			

==== Gowy ====
Gowy (1 seat)
Party	Candidate	Votes	%
Conservative	Eleanor Johnson	1,367	60.97
Labour	Nick Dixon	367	16.37
UKIP	Mandie Davies	211	9.41
Green	Steven Mitchell	151	6.74
Liberal Democrats	Trevor Glyn Jones	146	6.51
Turnout		2,446	74.3
Conservative hold			

==== Grange ====
Grange (1 seat)
Party	Candidate	Votes	%
Labour	Tony Sherlock	1,545	79.43
Conservative	Simon James Vernon Eardley	269	13.83
Green	Ged Isaac	131	6.74
Turnout		1,962	57.0
Labour hold			

==== Great Boughton ====
Great Boughton (2 seats)
Party	Candidate	Votes	%
Conservative	Keith William Edward Board	2,191	21.62
Conservative	Pamela Theresa Hall	2,153	21.24
Labour	John Creswick	1,464	14.44
Labour	Lee Bradshaw	1,373	13.55
Liberal Democrats	Rose Price	909	8.97
UKIP	Harry Cowley	652	6.43
UKIP	Peter James Lowe	597	5.89
Green	Philip Hannay	407	4.02
Green	Graham John Weaver	390	3.85
Turnout		5,581	76.1
Conservative hold			
Conservative hold			

==== Handbridge Park ====
Handbridge Park (2 seats)
Party	Candidate	Votes	%
Conservative	Razia Daniels	2,852	26.88
Conservative	Neil Anthony Sullivan	2,558	24.11
Labour	Jim Freeman	1,438	13.55
Labour	Pat McGuirk	1,400	13.20
Green	Alexandra Valerie Davies	679	6.40
Liberal Democrats	Peter James Speirs	546	5.15
UKIP	Fraser Smillie	453	4.27
UKIP	Allan Andrew James Weddell	349	3.29
Green	Dominic Leeson	335	3.16
Turnout		5,684	76.0
Conservative hold			
Conservative hold			

==== Hartford and Greenbank ====
Hartford and Greenbank (2 seats)
Party	Candidate	Votes	%
Conservative	Susan Kaur	2,496	28.09
Conservative	Patricia Mary Parkes	2,027	22.81
Labour	Derek Bowden	1,288	14.49
Labour	Peter Naylor	1,230	13.84
UKIP	Martin David Loftus	854	9.61
Liberal Democrats	Wendy Jones	519	5.84
Green	Owen Robert Hardiker	472	5.31
Turnout		4,958	75.1
Conservative hold			
Conservative hold			

==== Helsby ====
Helsby (1 seat)
Party	Candidate	Votes	%
Conservative	Alan Leonard McKie	1,511	52.10
Labour	Una Long	1,064	36.69
Green	David Hampton	191	6.59
Liberal Democrats	Valerie A Melnyczuk	134	4.62
Turnout		2,934	73.5
Conservative hold			

==== Hoole ====
Hoole (2 seats)
Party	Candidate	Votes	%
Labour	Alex Black	2,215	21.45
Labour	Angie Chidley	1,829	17.72
Conservative	Lesley Elizabeth George	1,190	11.53
Liberal Democrats	Mark Andrew Williams	1,170	11.33
UKIP	Rosemary Rogers	1,149	11.13
Conservative	Aden Lucas	1,051	10.18
Liberal Democrats	Alan Rollo	769	7.45
Green	Diana Mary Wilderspin-Jones	540	5.23
Green	Steven Richard Jones	411	3.98
Turnout		5,178	71.9
Labour gain from Liberal Democrats			
Labour hold			

==== Kingsley ====
Kingsley (1 seat)
Party	Candidate	Votes	%
Conservative	Ralph Edward Oultram	1,520	55.37
Labour	Jill Peacock	500	18.21
UKIP	Chris Proudfoot	292	10.64
Green	Alex Dedman	220	8.01
Liberal Democrats	George Martin England	213	7.76
Turnout		2,720	76.7
Conservative hold			

==== Lache ====
Lache (1 seat)
Party	Candidate	Votes	%
Labour	Jane Mercer	1,341	52.12
Conservative	Michael Tomlinson	784	30.47
UKIP	John Stroud	240	9.33
Green	Kevin Smart	119	4.62
Liberal Democrats	Aminul Hassan	89	3.46
Turnout		2,586	65.3
Labour hold			

==== Ledsham and Manor ====
Ledsham and Manor (2 seats)
Party	Candidate	Votes	%
Labour	Peter Rooney	2,004	24.07
Conservative	Gareth Anderson	1,803	21.66
Conservative	Rob Griffiths	1,585	19.04
Labour	Brenda Margaret Zaman	1,581	18.99
UKIP	Jonathan Charles Starkey	659	7.92
Liberal Democrats	Robert Michael Taylor	493	5.92
Independent	Ann McQuade	200	2.40
Turnout		4,738	73.4
Labour hold			
Conservative hold			

==== Little Neston and Burton ====
Little Neston and Burton (2 seats)
Party	Candidate	Votes	%
Conservative	Nige Jones	2,174	21.84
Labour	Louise Clare Gittins	2,108	21.18
Conservative	Kay Loch	1,961	19.70
Labour	Ray McHale	1,473	14.80
Liberal Democrats	Tony Cummins	853	8.57
UKIP	Sue Kettle	736	7.39
Liberal Democrats	Richard Adam Farrance	544	5.46
TUSC	Joe Rimmington	106	1.06
Turnout		5,370	76.1
Conservative hold			
Labour hold			

==== Malpas ====
Malpas (1 seat)
Party	Candidate	Votes	%
Conservative	Chris Whitehurst	1,241	52.01
Independent	Charles Lowick Higgie	777	32.56
Labour	Janet Black	206	8.63
Green	Michael John Boxall	162	6.79
Turnout		2,419	70.0
Conservative hold			

==== Marbury ====
Marbury (3 seats)
Party	Candidate	Votes	%
Conservative	Lynn Joyce Gibbon	3,253	20.10
Conservative	Norman Geoffrey Wright	2,952	18.24
Conservative	Don Hammond	2,898	17.90
Labour	Debbie Dalby	1,886	11.65
Labour	Jo Morlidge	1,698	10.49
Labour	Michael Falzon	1,481	9.15
Liberal Democrats	Annie Makepeace	1,193	7.37
Green	Sez Ismail	826	5.10
Turnout		6,580	68.9
Conservative hold			
Conservative hold			
Conservative hold			

==== Neston ====
Neston (1 seat)
Party	Candidate	Votes	%
Labour	Andrew Williams	1,058	50.69
Conservative	Paul Lloyd	693	33.21
Green	Geoffrey Lane Nicholls	161	7.71
Liberal Democrats	Derek Gaskell	140	6.71
TUSC	Declan Wells Khan	35	1.68
Turnout		2,097	63.7
Labour hold			

==== Netherpool ====
Netherpool (1 seat)
Party	Candidate	Votes	%
Labour	Diane Elizabeth Roberts	1,127	66.06
Conservative	Jack Harris	302	17.70
UKIP	Alistair Kirk	207	12.13
Green	Kier Aaron Sinclair	70	4.10
Turnout		1,714	61.9
Labour hold			

==== Newton ====
Newton (2 seats)
Party	Candidate	Votes	%
Labour	Richard Mark Beacham	2,101	19.96
Labour	Gill Watson	1,672	15.88
Conservative	Adrian Peter Walmsley	1,638	15.56
Conservative	Pauline Frances Brown	1,554	14.76
Liberal Democrats	Mark Edward Gant	827	7.86
UKIP	Frank Samuel	626	5.95
Green	Simon Ward Brown	581	5.52
Independent	John Brian Ebo	505	4.80
Liberal Democrats	Annie Mead	501	4.76
Green	Mary Elizabeth Horbury	477	4.53
TUSC	Kenny Cunningham	46	0.44
Turnout		5,460	69.2
Labour gain from Conservative			
Labour gain from Conservative			

==== Parkgate ====
Parkgate (1 seat)
Party	Candidate	Votes	%
Independent	Martin Barker	931	39.22
Conservative	Andrew Merrill	878	36.98
Labour	Abdul Kadir Jilani	314	13.23
Green	Oliver James Peers	251	10.57
Turnout		2,411	77.1
Independent gain from Conservative			

==== Rossmore ====
Rossmore (1 seat)
Party	Candidate	Votes	%
Labour	Pat Merrick	1,074	59.17
Conservative	Linda Ellen Jones	328	18.07
Socialist Labour	Kenny Spain	286	15.76
Green	Joanne Frances Evans-Stone	127	7.00
Turnout		1,831	59.3
Labour hold			

==== Saughall and Mollington ====
Saughall and Mollington (1 seat)
Party	Candidate	Votes	%
Conservative	Brian Crowe	1,280	44.93
Independent	Carl Denis Jones	737	25.87
Labour	Sally Clare Atkin	572	20.08
UKIP	John Walton	172	6.04
Liberal Democrats	Sally Louise Senior	88	3.09
Turnout		2,872	75.3
Conservative hold			

==== Shakerley ====
Shakerley (1 seat)
Party	Candidate	Votes	%
Conservative	Mark Lister Stocks	1,414	63.95
Labour	Philippa Jamieson	597	27.00
Liberal Democrats	Mary Elizabeth Thompson	200	9.05
Turnout		2,237	65.4
Conservative hold			

==== St Paul's ====
St Paul's (2 seats)
Party	Candidate	Votes	%
Labour	Angela Janette Claydon	2,789	36.83
Labour	Robert Ian Bisset	2,286	30.19
Conservative	Francis Kwateng	1,216	16.06
Conservative	Steve Loch	830	10.96
Liberal Democrats	Graham Handley	452	5.97
Turnout		4,436	65.7
Labour hold			
Labour hold			

==== Strawberry ====
Strawberry (1 seat)
Party	Candidate	Votes	%
Labour	Mark Anthony Henesy	1,493	48.66
Conservative	Nicholas Hebson	1,155	37.65
UKIP	Sarah Jane Mugridge	377	12.29
TUSC	Dan Lee	43	1.40
Turnout		3,082	73.6
Labour hold			

==== Sutton ====
Sutton (2 seats)
Party	Candidate	Votes	%
Labour	Paul Francis Donovan	2,649	30.99
Labour	Nicole Meardon	2,241	26.22
Conservative	Sandra Evans	1,053	12.32
Conservative	Lee David Evans	1,042	12.19
UKIP	Alan Moore	923	10.80
Green	Chloe Joinson	360	4.21
Liberal Democrats	Rosemarie Handley	280	3.28
Turnout		4,784	67.2
Labour hold			
Labour hold			

==== Tarporley ====
Tarporley (1 seat)
Party	Candidate	Votes	%
Conservative	Eveleigh Moore Dutton	1,938	67.36
Liberal Democrats	Ian Douglas Priestner	510	17.73
Labour	Carol Wilson	429	14.91
Turnout		2,906	75.0
Conservative hold			

==== Tarvin and Kelsall ====
Tarvin and Kelsall (2 seats)
Party	Candidate	Votes	%
Conservative	John Leather	2,588	29.37
Conservative	Hugo William Edward Deynem	2,414	27.39
Liberal Democrats	Ted Lush	1,066	12.10
Liberal Democrats	Andrew Paul Hyde	957	10.86
Labour	David Edwards	686	7.78
Labour	Gina Lewis	611	6.93
Green	Louis McEvoy	491	5.57
Turnout		5,082	73.7
Conservative hold			
Conservative hold			

==== Tattenhall ====
Tattenhall (1 seat)
Party	Candidate	Votes	%
Conservative	Mike Jones	1,414	52.23
Liberal Democrats	Edward Walley	448	16.55
Labour	John Robert Vernon	439	16.22
UKIP	Ray Hill	406	15.00
Turnout		2,723	74.3
Conservative hold			

==== Upton ====
Upton (2 seats)
Party	Candidate	Votes	%
Conservative	Jill Houlbrook	1,956	21.24
Labour	Matt Bryan	1,723	18.71
Conservative	Hilarie June McNae	1,657	17.99
Labour	David Vincent Ford	1,429	15.51
Liberal Democrats	Jean Elizabeth Evans	814	8.84
Liberal Democrats	James Alexander Cameron	591	6.42
UKIP	Jules Evans	545	5.92
Green	Aled Rhys Howells	496	5.38
Turnout		5,045	71.5
Conservative hold			
Labour gain from Conservative			

==== Weaver and Cuddington ====
Weaver and Cuddington (3 seats)
Party	Candidate	Votes	%
Conservative	Charles Fifield	3,194	16.86
Conservative	Paul Williams	3,180	16.79
Conservative	Harry Tonge	2,580	13.62
Labour	Robert Cernik	1,772	9.35
Independent	Gillian Edwards	1,764	9.31
Labour	Callum Bryce	1,745	9.21
Labour	Andy Stott	1,603	8.46
UKIP	Chris Watkin	1,357	7.16
Liberal Democrats	Stephen M Donhue	928	4.90
Green	Andy Robinson	820	4.33
Turnout		7,380	71.3
Conservative hold			
Conservative hold			
Conservative hold			

==== Whitby ====
Whitby (2 seats)
Party	Candidate	Votes	%
Labour	Brian Jones	2,104	25.82
Labour	Karen Louise Shore	1,828	22.43
Conservative	Brian Anderson	1,368	16.79
Conservative	Robert Redford Crompton	1,248	15.31
UKIP	Glen Lomax	905	11.10
Green	Sarah Ann Bowers	267	3.28
Liberal Democrats	Tom Marlow	223	2.74
Green	Tony Griffiths	207	2.54
Turnout		3,983	60.9
Labour hold			
Labour gain from Conservative			

==== Willaston and Thornton ====
Willaston and Thornton (1 seat)
Party	Candidate	Votes	%
Conservative	Myles Hogg	1,912	75.39
Labour	James Robert Evans	624	24.61
Turnout		2,569	76.8
Conservative hold			

==== Winnington and Castle ====
Winnington and Castle (2 seats)
Party	Candidate	Votes	%
Labour	Sam Naylor	1,719	23.75
Labour	Paul Dolan	1,675	23.14
Conservative	Jim Sinar	1,193	16.48
Conservative	Kathy Ford	1,147	15.85
UKIP	Amos Daniel Wright	588	8.12
Green	Darrelle Ann Bower	391	5.40
Liberal Democrats	Alice Philippa Chapman	305	4.21
Northwich Independent	Phillip Michael Dawson Bower	220	3.04
Turnout		4,284	59.6
Labour hold			
Labour hold			

==== Winsford Over and Verdin ====
Winsford Over and Verdin (3 seats)
Party	Candidate	Votes	%
Labour	Tom Blackmore	2,279	15.59
Labour	Don Beckett	2,154	14.74
Conservative	Michael Baynham	1,717	11.75
Labour	Arthur Leslie Neil	1,684	11.52
Conservative	Lynda Jones	1,589	10.87
Conservative	Margaret Dolphin	1,440	9.85
UKIP	Kerrie Jane Fawley-Hopkins	1,059	7.24
Liberal Democrats	Bob Barton	796	5.45
Liberal Democrats	Charlie Parkinson	659	4.51
Liberal Democrats	Brandon Parkey	545	3.73
Green	Sue Quormby	350	2.39
Green	Alice Rebecca Brown	346	2.37
Turnout		5,847	59.3
Labour hold			
Labour hold			
Conservative hold			

==== Winsford Swanlow and Dene ====
Winsford Swanlow and Dene (2 seats)
Party	Candidate	Votes	%
Labour	Stephen Burns	1,677	23.20
Labour	David Armstrong	1,306	18.07
Liberal Democrats	Malcolm Ian Gaskill	945	13.07
Conservative	Phil Rimmer	861	11.91
Liberal Democrats	Bev Theron	767	10.61
Conservative	Lesley Greenwood	744	10.29
UKIP	David Michael Kendrick	705	9.75
Green	Marc William Vincent Hatton	224	3.10
Turnout		4,120	60.4
Labour hold			
Labour hold			

==== Winsford Wharton ====
Winsford Wharton (2 seats)
Party	Candidate	Votes	%
Labour	Brian Michael Clarke	1,920	28.08
Labour	Pamela Booher	1,785	26.10
Conservative	Charles Hardy	926	13.54
Conservative	Peter Jones	903	13.21
Liberal Democrats	Chris Bore	437	6.39
Liberal Democrats	Janet Fitzmaurice	351	5.13
Green	Lyndsay Barwell	288	4.21
Green	Ian Molton	228	3.33
Turnout		4,181	58.1
Labour hold			
Labour hold			

==== Witton ====
Witton (2 seats)
Party	Candidate	Votes	%
Labour	Tony Lawrenson	2,011	34.22
Labour	Val Armstrong	1,355	23.06
Conservative	George McDowell	1,222	20.79
Conservative	Linda Nelson	924	15.72
Liberal Democrats	Keith Hinde	365	6.21
Turnout		3,665	57.2
Labour hold			
Labour hold			

== Changes between 2015 and 2019 ==
=== Ellesmere Port Town by-election 2018 ===
Labour councillor Lynn Clare (Ellesmere Port Town) died in February 2018. The by-election was held on 3 May. This was on the same day as other local elections.

Ellsmere Port Town by-election, 3 May 2018
Party	Candidate	Votes	%	±%
Labour	Mike Edwardson	1,447	82.9	▲22.6
Conservative	Robert Griffiths	239	13.7	▲3.5
Green	Mathew Roberts	60	3.4	▼4.4
Majority		1,208	69.2	▲29.2
Turnout		1,748	24.5	▼31.2
Rejected ballots		2	0.1	
Labour hold		Swing	▲14.6	
