= Wardle, Cheshire =

Village in Cheshire, England

Coordinates: 53.110°N 2.583°W

Wardle
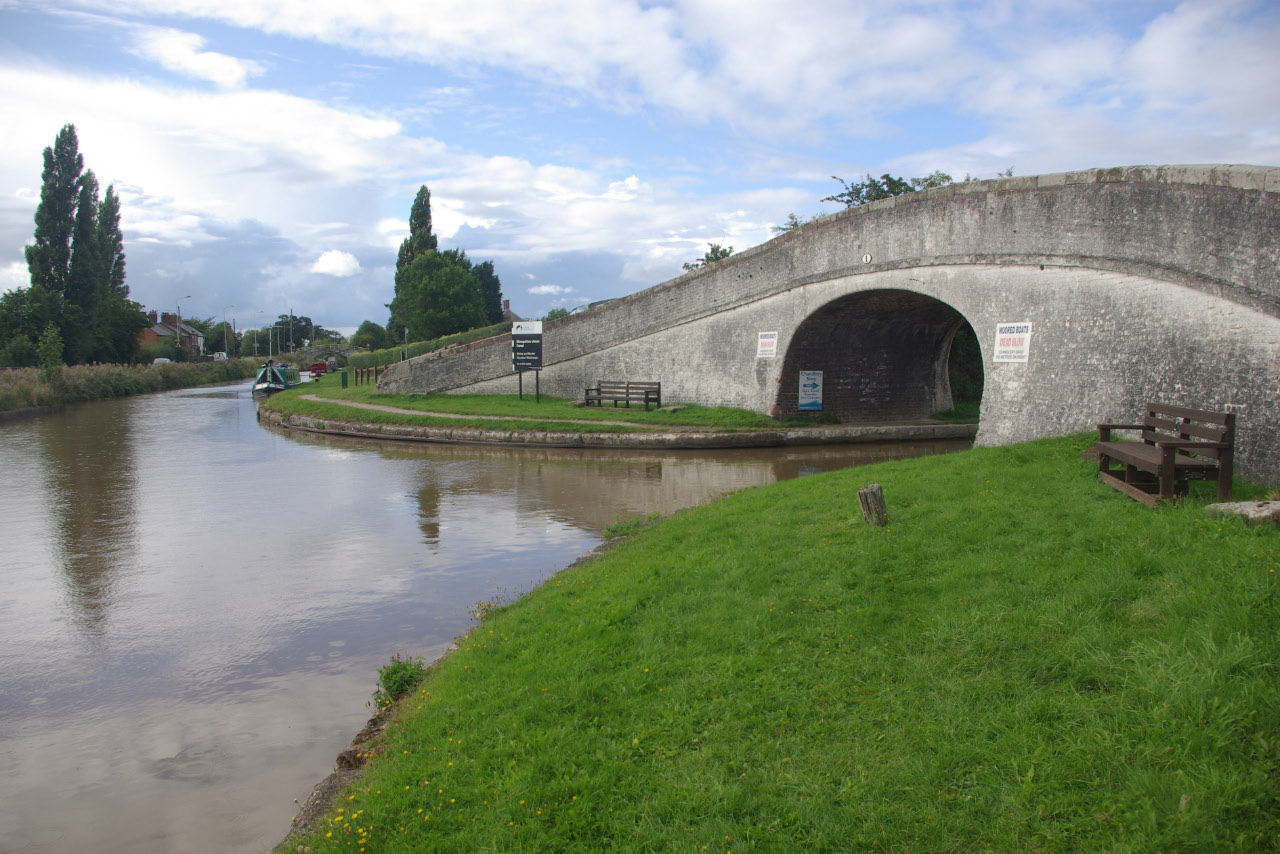
- Barbridge Junction on the Shropshire Union Canal

- Location within Cheshire
- Population: 254 (2011)
- OS grid reference: SJ610570
- Civil parish: Wardle
- Unitary authority: Cheshire East
- Ceremonial county: Cheshire
- Region: North West
- Country: England
- Sovereign state: United Kingdom
- Post town: NANTWICH
- Postcode district: CW5
- Dialling code: 01270
- Police: Cheshire
- Fire: Cheshire
- Ambulance: North West
- UK Parliament: Chester South and Eddisbury

Wardle is a village and civil parish in the unitary authority of Cheshire East and the ceremonial county of Cheshire, England. The village lies on the Shropshire Union Canal, north west of Barbridge Junction (at SJ610570), and is 4 miles to the north west of Nantwich, and the parish also includes part of the small settlement of Wardle Bank. The total population is around 250. RAF Calveley was a flight-training station during the Second World War, and the Mark III radio telescope stood on the airfield site in 1966–96. The modern civil parish includes Wardle Industrial Estate and is otherwise largely agricultural. Nearby villages include Barbridge, Calveley and Haughton.

== History ==
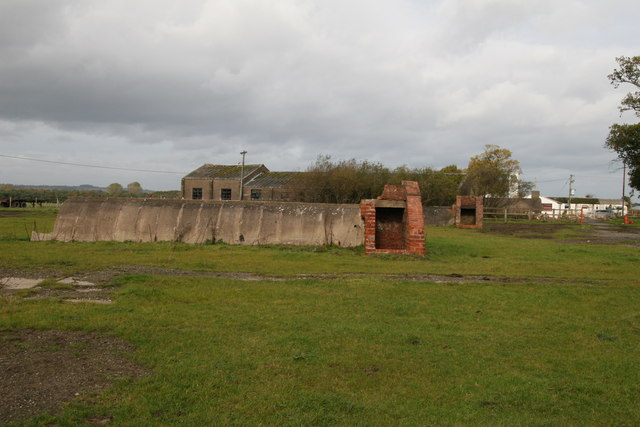
Derelict buildings of RAF Calveley

Watfield Pavement, a stone road believed to have originally formed part of a Roman road from Chester to Chesterton in Staffordshire, passed through or adjacent to the parish, and a bronze Roman coin was found nearby. Wardle appears in the Domesday Book of 1086 as "Warhelle". Wardle Hall was the seat of the Prestland family, passing to the Woodhey branch of the Wilbraham family in the early 17th century. A map dated around 1875 shows brickworks and brick fields adjacent to the Shropshire Union Canal, and mills and a brickworks were present in this area on a 1947 map.

RAF Calveley airfield, completed in 1942, served as a flight-training centre during the Second World War. The RAF station closed in 1946, but it remained in use as an airfield until 1959. Several of the buildings have survived, including the control tower, hangars and a Romney hut. The Mark III radio telescope was constructed in 1966 on the base of a former hangar at the airfield. It had an elliptical meshwork dish measuring 25 × 38 metres. Controlled from Jodrell Bank Observatory, near Holmes Chapel, it initially worked in concert with the Mark II telescope, 24 km away at Jodrell Bank, and later formed part of what is now the MERLIN network of radio telescopes. The Mark III telescope was dismantled in 1996.

== Governance ==
Wardle is administered by the Wardle Parish Council. From 1974 the civil parish was served by Crewe and Nantwich Borough Council, which was succeeded on 1 April 2009 by the unitary authority of Cheshire East. Wardle falls in the parliamentary constituency of Chester South and Eddisbury, which has been represented since the 2024 general election by Aphra Brandreth of the Conservative Party. It was previously part of the Eddisbury constituency, which since its establishment in 1983 had been held by the Conservative MPs Alastair Goodlad (1983–99), Stephen O'Brien (1999–2015), Antoinette Sandbach (2015–19) and Edward Timpson (2019–24).

== Geography and transport ==
The Shropshire Union Canal and the A51 (Nantwich Road) run side by side across the parish from the north west to the south east, and they form part of its northern boundary. The Shropshire Union's Barbridge Junction lies towards the south east of the parish; from the junction, the Middlewich Branch initially heads north east and then turns to run east–west. The Crewe–Chester railway line also runs broadly east–west across the north east of the parish. The A51 crosses the Shropshire Union mainline at Wardle Farm Bridge to the north west of Wardle village; Calveley Hall Lane diverges adjacent to this bridge, to run northwards over the railway line and through Wardle Bank to the parish of Calveley. The Weaver Way footpath loops through the south east of the parish, following the Shropshire Union and Middlewich Branch canal towpaths.

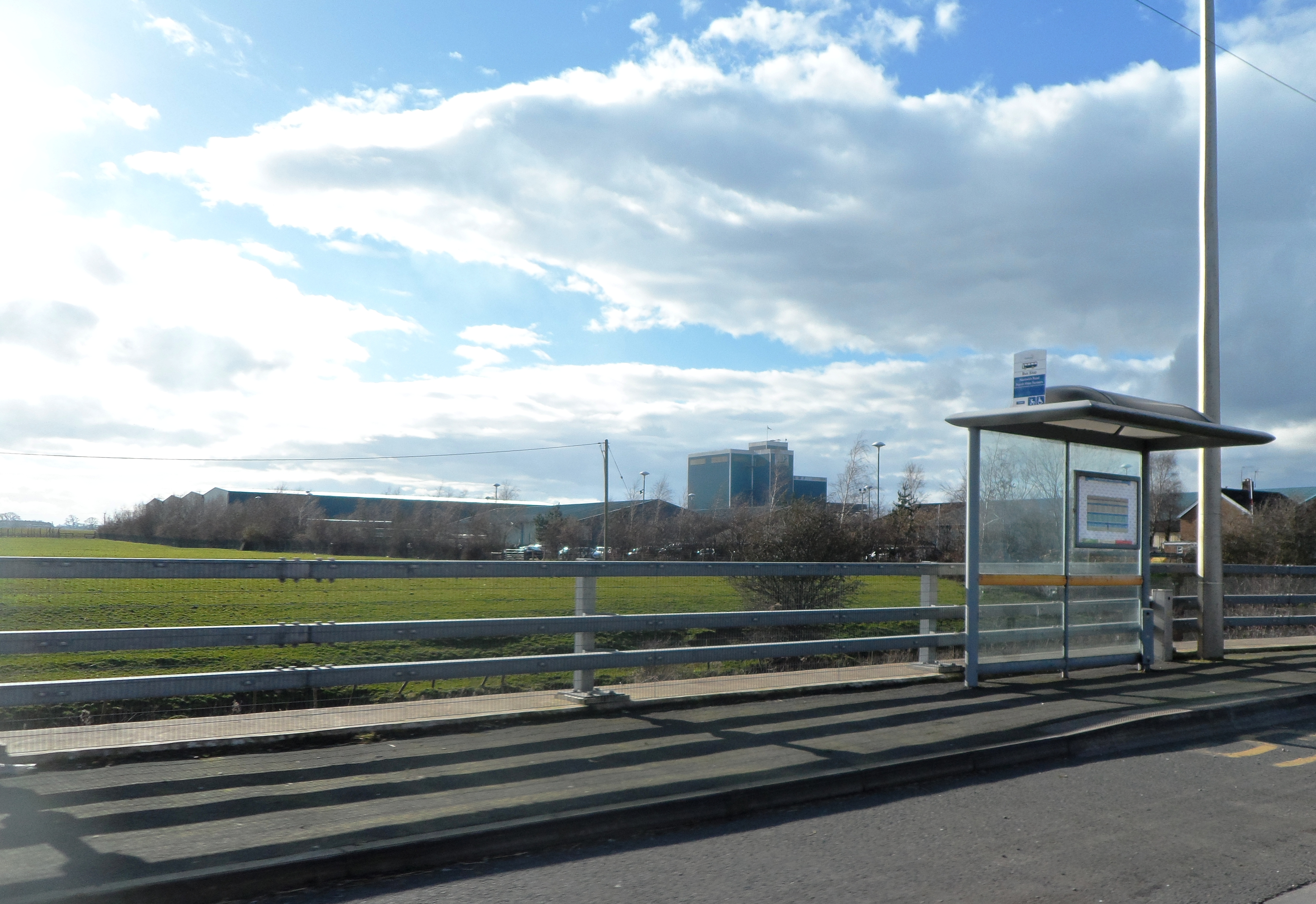
Industrial estate, from the A51

The terrain is flat, with an average elevation of around 55 metres. Much of the area to the south west of the Shropshire Union/A51 is an industrial estate, accessed via Green Lane. The remainder of the parish is predominantly agricultural. The woodland of Hill's Gorse lies in the north east of the parish, and Wardle Covert, part of Long Wood and several smaller areas of woodland are in the west of the parish. Two water bodies lie between Wardle Covert and the Shropshire Union, and numerous small meres and ponds are scattered across the farmland.

== Demography ==
According to the 2001 Census, the parish had a population of 181, increasing to 254 in 112 households at the 2011 Census. This represents an increase from the 19th-century population but a decline from the population of 1951; historical population figures are 115 (1801), 178 (1851), 193 (1901) and 285 (1951). The population density was 0.3 persons/hectare in 2011, well below the average of 3.2 persons/hectare for Cheshire East.

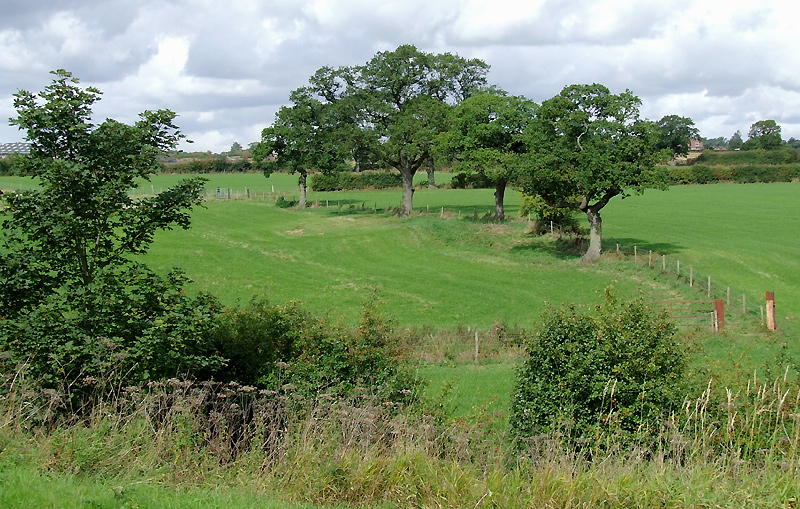
Pasture north of Wardle village

== Landmarks ==
Wardle Old Hall, a red-brick former farmhouse dating from the early 18th century, stands by the canal. The oldest listed building in the civil parish, it is decorated with prominent pilasters and is listed at grade II* for the "high quality of the Baroque facade". Two canal bridges are listed at the lower grade of II: Roving Bridge at Barbridge Junction and Rutter's Bridge over the Middlewich Branch; both date from around 1830 and were probably designed by Thomas Telford. The Canal House, of a similar date and also listed at grade II, stands at the junction. A public house, the Jolly Tar, was demolished in 2016.

The grade-II-listed Wardle Bridge Farmhouse, built by John Tollemache, Baron Tollemache, of the Peckforton estate in around 1860, has decorative timberwork and octagonal-latticed cast-iron windows. A grade-II-listed, red-sandstone pinfold stands by the A51; used to confine straying cattle, it dates from the early 19th century and is one of the few examples to have survived in Cheshire.

== Education ==
As of 2016, there are no schools within the civil parish. Wardle falls within the catchment areas of Calveley Primary Academy in Calveley for primary education and Tarporley High School in Tarporley for secondary education.

== See also ==
- Listed buildings in Wardle, Cheshire
- List of extant pinfolds in Cheshire
