= TXS 1321+045 =

Radio galaxy in the constellation Virgo

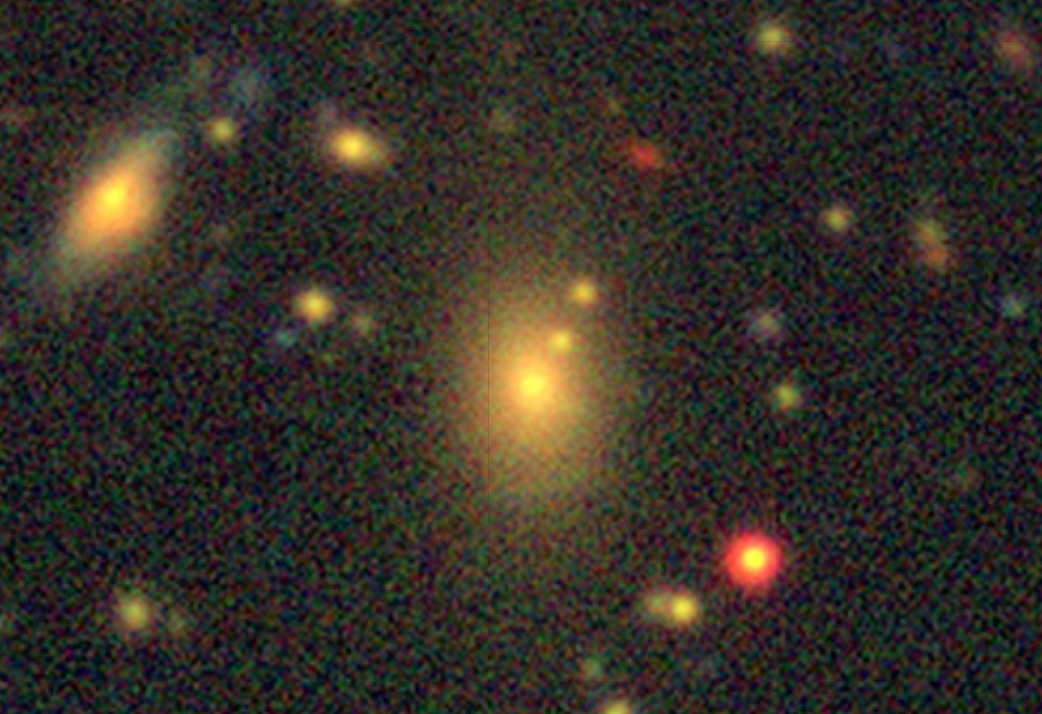
- TXS 1321+045 captured with DESI Legacy Surveys

Observation data (J2000.0 epoch)
- Constellation: Virgo
- Right ascension: 13^{h} 24^{m} 19.67^{s}
- Declination: +04° 19′ 07.20″
- Redshift: 0.263061
- Heliocentric radial velocity: 78,864 km/s
- Distance: 3.177 Gly
- Group or cluster: MaxBCG J201.08197+04.31863
- Apparent magnitude (B): 19.5

Characteristics
- Type: BrCLG AGN
- Size: ~635,000 ly (194.6 kpc) (estimated)

Other designations
- 2MASX J13241962+0419068, 1321+045, OGC 627, NVSS J132419+041906, RX J1324.2+0419, MaxBCG J201.08197+04.31863 BCG, RGB J1324+043 LEDA 3807422

TXS 1321+045 or 1321+045, is a radio galaxy located in the constellation of Virgo. The redshift of the galaxy is (z) 0.263 and it was first discovered as a radio-loud object from the Sloan Digital Sky Survey (SDSS). This object is classified as the brightest cluster galaxy (BCG) of the galaxy cluster, MaxBCG J201.08197+04.31863 and as such dominates the cluster. It also contains a compact steep spectrum source (CSS).

== Description ==
TXS 1321+045 is categorized as a low-excitation radio galaxy (LERG) of low luminosity. The structure of the galaxy is found to be compact based on high resolution imaging made with MERLIN, comprising at least three components; mainly a central radio core and two radio lobes that are found on the opposite sides of the core. The total flux density of the core is estimated to be 11 ± 2 mJy, while the lobes have flux densities of 38 ± 4 and 49 ± 5 mJy. Observations made by MERLIN at 1.6 GHz frequencies have detected the same core with diffused radio emission from opposite sides. Further observations have also shown the source is extended by around 40 kiloparsecs, with two knot features that are embedded inside an extended region.

Observations made by the Very Long Baseline Interferometry (VLBI) at both 4.5 and 7.5 GHz frequencies have found the core is divided into two separate components, with total measured flux densities of 1.24 ± 0.03 and 0.74 ± 0.44 mJy. The secondary component is classified as a radio jet that has a linear size of around 20 parsecs. However its orientation degree is different compared to the lobes, indicating a new activity phase has begun recently with the fact the outer parts of the lobes are no longer evolving.

The central supermassive black hole of the galaxy is estimated to be 9.46 ± 1.42 M_{☉} based on the study of compact sources published in 2025. The stellar velocity dispersion is estimated to be 333.13 ± 49.97 kilometers per seconds. A study published in 2013, found the galaxy is undergoing star formation of 5.38 M_{☉} per year.
