= QSO B1524−136 =

Quasar in the constellation Libra

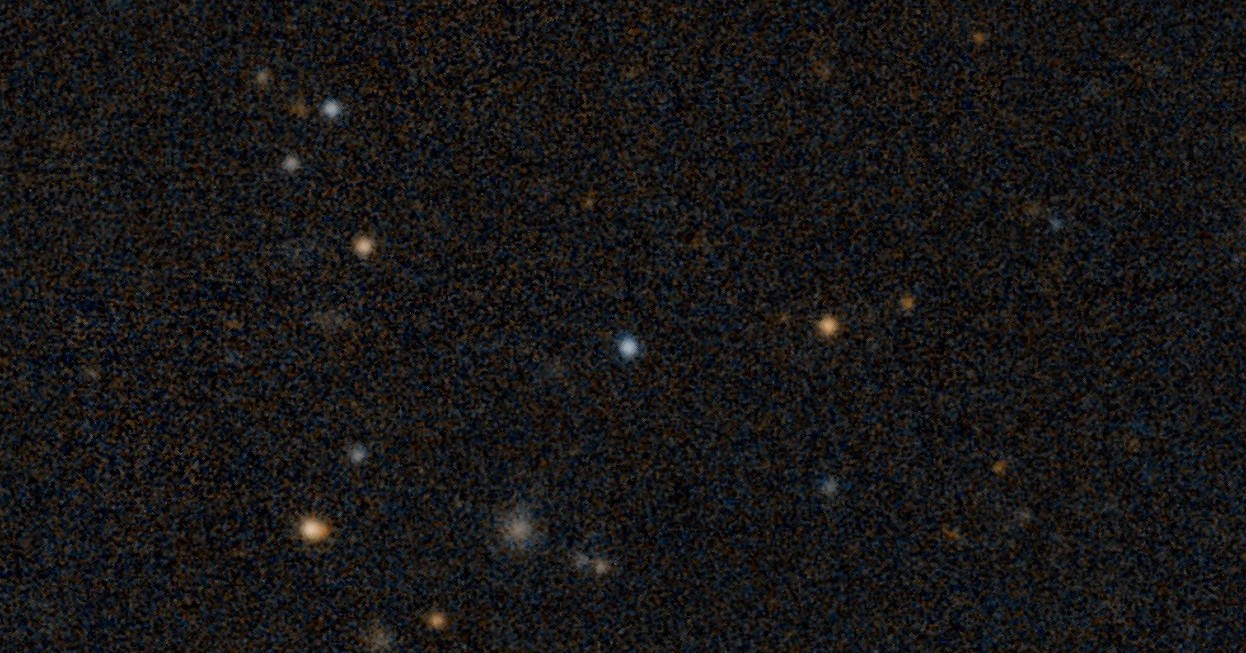
- The quasar QSO B1524−136

Observation data (J2000.0 epoch)
- Constellation: Libra
- Right ascension: 15^{h} 26^{m} 59.44^{s}
- Declination: −13° 51′ 00.26″
- Redshift: 1.687000
- Heliocentric radial velocity: 505,750 km/s
- Distance: 9.952 Gly
- Apparent magnitude (V): 20.5

Characteristics
- Type: Opt var, RLQ
- Notable features: Two-sided jet

Other designations
- PKS B1524−136, OR -140, LEDA 2828423, Cul 1524−136, PAPER J231.68−13.79, NVSS J152659−135100

QSO B1524−136 is a quasar located in the constellation of Libra. It has a redshift of (z) 1.687 and it was first identified by astronomers from the Parkes Observatory in 1966. The object is classified as a compact steep spectrum source (CSS) and is noted for its two-sided radio jet.

== Description ==
QSO B1524−136 is a radio-loud AGN. It has a radio spectrum that appears as steep but also flat. M. Bondi classifies the source as variable at low frequencies although no significant variations in flux density have been detected. The supermassive black hole mass for this object is estimated to be 9.52 M_{☉} based on assumptions of absorption lines.

The radio structure of QSO B1524−136 is quite compact. Observations with Very Long Baseline Interferometry (VLBI) showed, its structure as elongated at 45° while a double structure imaged by Very Large Array A-array showed it as double. When imaged by MERLIN at 5 GHz, the structure has two main components located in north and south directions, with the former having a high peak brightness. A radio image taken by MK2 VLBI, found it having a bright northern hotspot and a jet connecting from the radio core to the hotspot. This jet is estimated to have a width of 7 milliarcseconds and a length of 35 milliarcseconds. A low radio emission gap can also be seen between the core and the jet's start point. Very Long Baseline Array (VLBA) also detected the same jet, displaying a series of knots. They appeared to be bent by 40° before entering the hotspot region. A counter-jet was also detected by VLBA, making QSO B1524−136 having two jets on each side of its nucleus.

Polarization has been observed in several jet regions of QSO B1524−136. However its rotation measure value changes as the jet travels from one region to the next. This change might be explained by an external screen whose magnetic field orientation varies along with the jet, in the way rotation measure variations are reproduced. A large rotation measure has been found for its strong northern component, with a value of 20,411 rad m^{−2}.
