= List of extant pinfolds in Cheshire =

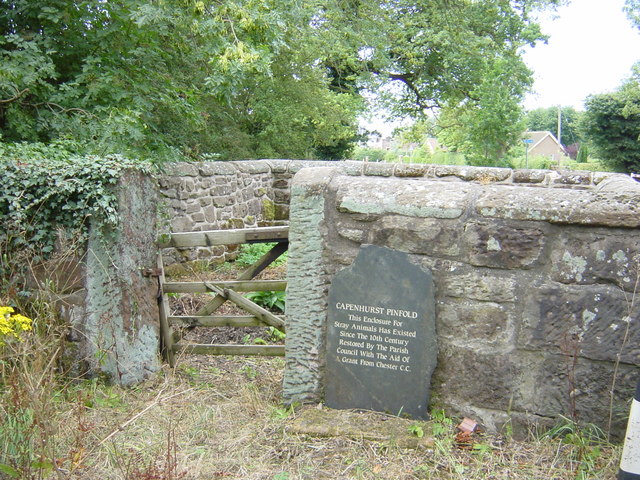
Capenhurst pinfold

A pinfold was a structure into which straying animals were placed until they were retrieved by their owner on payment of a fine. Other terms for the structure were penfold or pound. These names were derived from the Old English words pund (pound) and fuld (fold). In Cheshire, most of these were square or circular stone structures, although there is a circular pinfold in Henbury. There is evidence of the existence of at least 153 pinfolds in Cheshire, although, as of 2010, only eight of these remain in the current county of Cheshire. There are also the remains of four other pinfolds in the county.

== Key ==
Grade	Criteria
II	Buildings of national importance and special interest

Extant pinfolds, locations, and any listed building grade
Location	Map ref and coordinates	Photograph	Dimensions	Notes	Grading
Capenhurst	SJ366737; 53.25722°N 2.95159°W		Approximately 6 metres (19 ft 8 in) square. Walls 1.4 metres (4 ft 7 in) high	Coursed sandstone walls with capstones	II
Great Budworth	SJ686792; 53.30926°N 2.47210°W		Approximately 10 metres (32 ft 10 in) square. Walls 1.4 metres (4 ft 7 in) high	Coursed sandstone walls with capstones	II
Harthill	SJ500552; 53.09218°N 2.74719°W		Probably: front and back walls 6 metres (19 ft 8 in), side walls 3 metres (9 ft 10 in), height 2 metres (6 ft 7 in)	Roof and additional walling added. Now used as a storage shed.	—
Henbury	SJ862727; 53.25135°N 2.20729°W		Circular, approximately 4.5 metres (14 ft 9 in) diameter walls approximately 1.2 metres (3 ft 11 in) high	Roughly coursed sandstone rubble with flat cement coping	II
Hoole Village	SJ433687; 53.21280°N 2.85058°W		5 metres (16 ft 5 in) square height 1.8 metres (5 ft 11 in)	Coursed sandstone	II
Little Budworth	SJ593654; 53.18464°N 2.61019°W		6.5 metres (21 ft 4 in) square height 1.6 metres (5 ft 3 in)	Coursed sandstone walls with capstones	II
Sutton Lane Ends	SJ927716; 53.24166°N 2.11016°W		Front wall 7.7 metres (25 ft 3 in) height 1.85 metres (6 ft 1 in); back wall 7.7 metres (25 ft 3 in) height 1 metre (3 ft 3 in); side walls 6 metres (19 ft 8 in) height 1 metre (3 ft 3 in)	Coursed sandstone walls with capstones.	?
Wardle	SJ609572; 53.11084°N 2.58418°W		4.2 metres (13 ft 9 in) square height 1.2 metres (3 ft 11 in)	Coursed sandstone walls with capstones.	II

Extant remains of pinfolds, locations, and any listed building grade
Location	Map ref and coordinates	Photograph	Dimensions	Notes	Grading
Bickerton	SJ515538; 53.07997°N 2.72518°W		Originally approximately: front and back walls 6 metres (19 ft 8 in), side walls 4 metres (13 ft 1 in), height 1.5 metres (4 ft 11 in)	Remains of sandstone side walls up to 1.5 metres (4 ft 11 in) in places. Little remains of back wall; front wall gone.	—
Poole	SJ639554; 53.09520°N 2.54007°W		Formerly 3 metres (9 ft 10 in) square. Walls 1 metre (3 ft 3 in) high	Built in red sandstone rubble, now partly demolished.	II
Shocklach	SJ438492; 53.03759°N 2.83829°W		A restored enclosure: front and back walls 5.2 metres (17 ft 1 in), side walls 3.6 metres (11 ft 10 in), height 1 metre (3 ft 3 in)	Post and rail ences at the back and sides; front open to the road. Contains the Shocklach Millennium Cross	—
Tarvin	SJ491669; 53.19725°N 2.76288°W			As of 2010 undergoing excavation	—
