= Lovell Telescope =

Radio telescope at Jodrell Bank Observatory, Cheshire, England

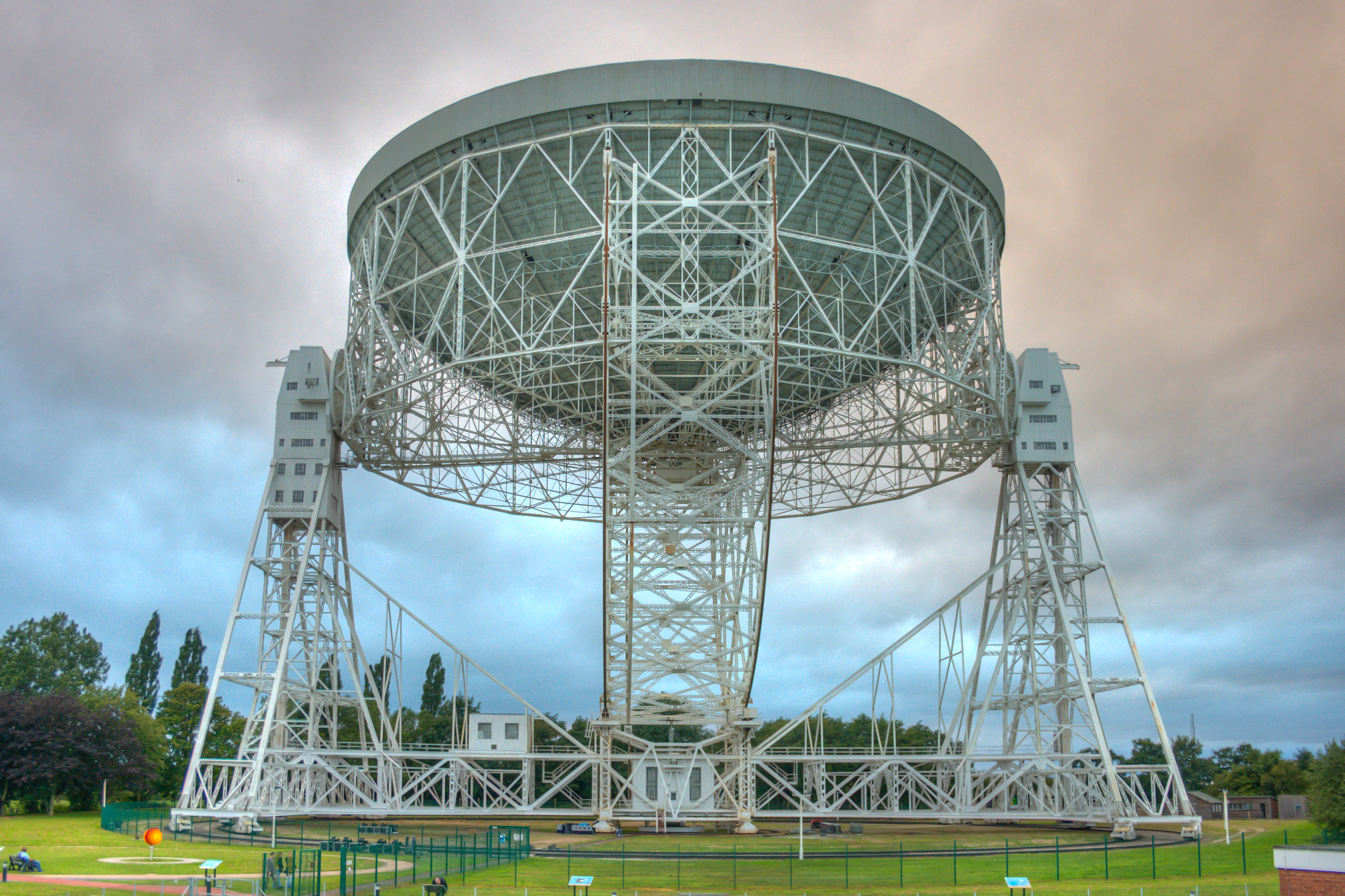
- The Lovell Telescope
- Alternative names: 250 ft telescope
- Named after: Bernard Lovell
- Location: Goostrey, Cheshire East, Cheshire, North West England, England
- Coordinates: 53°14′11″N 2°18′30″W
- Wavelength: 5 GHz (6.0 cm)
- Built: 3 September 1952–1957
- Telescope style: radio telescope
- Diameter: 250 ft (76 m)
- Collecting area: 4,560 m^{2} (49,100 sq ft)
- Focal length: 22.9 m (75 ft 2 in)
- Website: www.jodrellbank.manchester.ac.uk
- Location within the United Kingdom
- Related media on Commons

The Lovell Telescope (/ˈlʌvəl/ LUV-əl) is a radio telescope at Jodrell Bank Observatory, near Goostrey, Cheshire, in the north-west of England. Completed in 1957, the telescope was the largest steerable dish radio telescope in the world at 76.2 metres (250 feet) in diameter; it is now the third-largest, after the US Green Bank telescope, and German Effelsberg telescope.

Originally known as the "250 ft telescope" or the Radio Telescope at Jodrell Bank, it became the Mark I telescope from 1960 as future telescopes (the Mark II, III, and IV) began design. It was renamed the Lovell Telescope in 1987 after Sir Bernard Lovell, and became a Grade I listed building in 1988. The telescope forms part of the MERLIN and European VLBI Network arrays of radio telescopes.

The telescope was influential in the early detections of extragalactic objects including quasars, astrophysical masers, and Einstein rings. Soviet and US probes of the Space Race were tracked en route to the Moon, Venus, and Mars; in 1966 it received the first imagery from the Moon's surface taken by Luna 9. At a height of the Cold War in 1962 and 1963, the telescope operated as an early-warning radar of the four-minute warning system for the Soviet Strategic Rocket Forces.

Both Bernard Lovell and Charles Husband were knighted for their roles in creating the telescope. In September 2006, the telescope won the BBC's online competition to find the UK's greatest "Unsung Landmark".

The telescope is visible from Manchester Airport, high-rise buildings in Manchester such as the Beetham Tower, and distant vantage points such as the Pennines, Winter Hill, Snowdonia, Beeston Castle, and the Peak District.

== Construction ==
=== Conception and construction of the Mark I ===
Bernard Lovell built the Transit Telescope at Jodrell Bank in the late 1940s. This was a 218 ft (66 m)-diameter radio telescope that could only point directly upwards; the next logical step was to build a telescope that could look at all parts of the sky so that more sources could be observed, as well as for longer integration times. Although the Transit Telescope had been designed and constructed by the astronomers that used it, a fully steerable telescope would need to be professionally designed and constructed; the first challenge was to find an engineer willing to do the job. This turned out to be Charles Husband, whom Lovell first met on 8 September 1949.

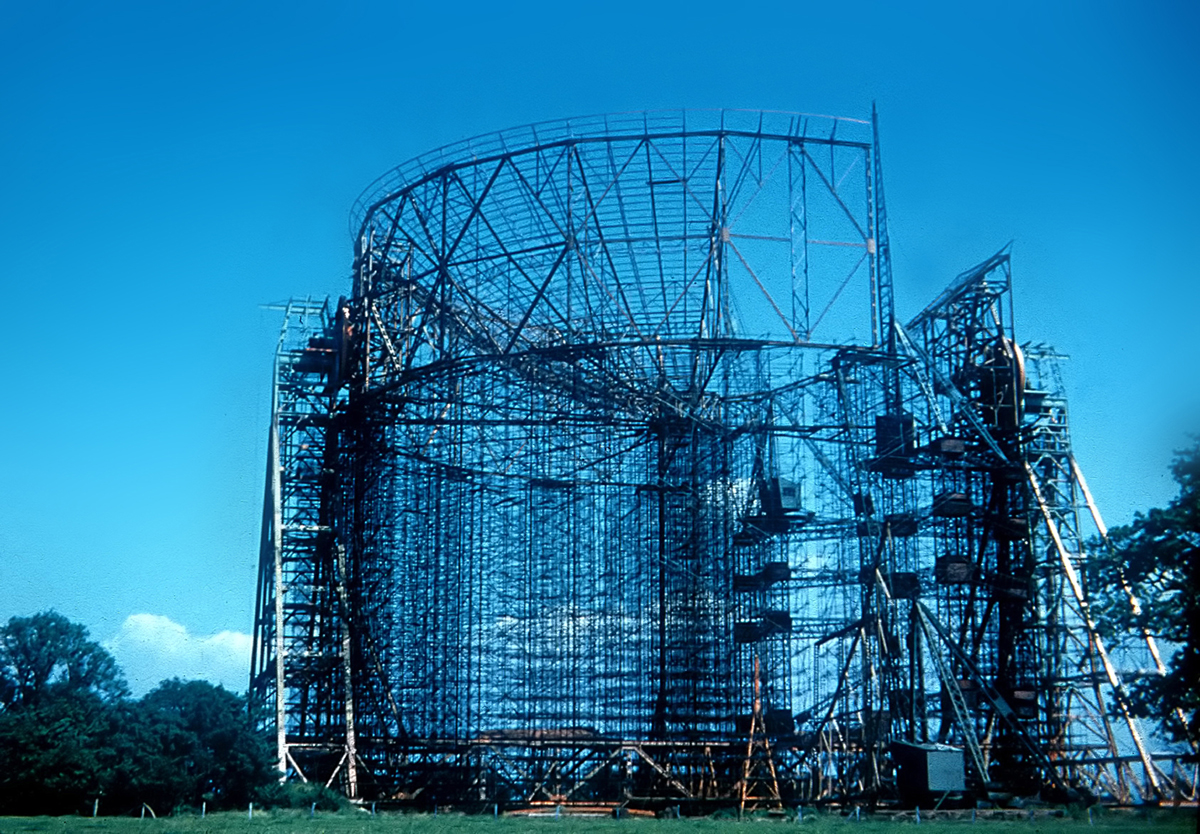
The Mark 1 under construction

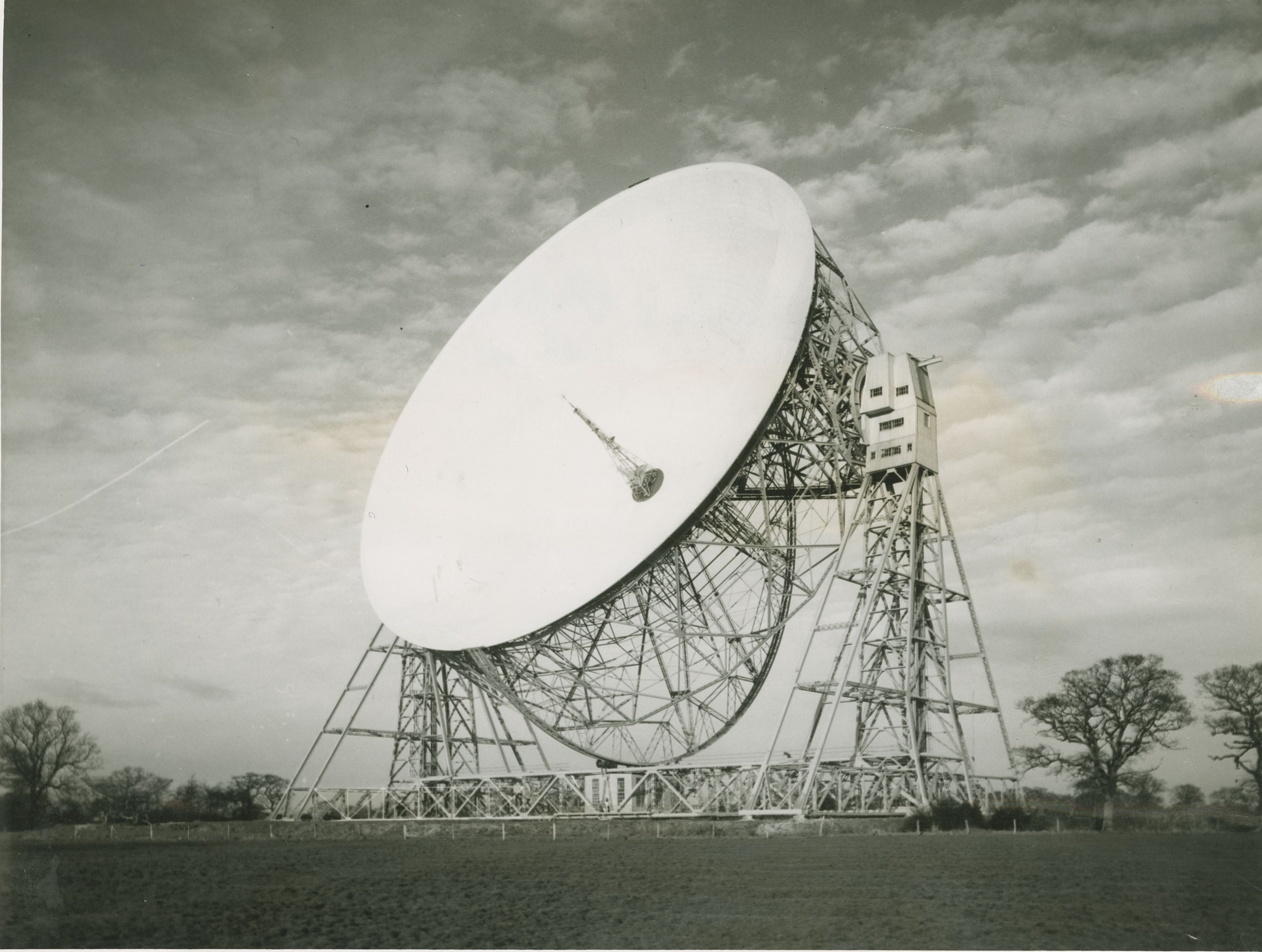
Lovell Telescope in 1961

Two circular 15" turret drive gear sets and associated pinions from 15-inch (38-cm) gun turrets were bought cheaply in 1950; these came from the World War I battleships HMS Revenge and Royal Sovereign, which were being broken up at the time. The bearings became the two main altitude rotator bearings of the telescope, with the appropriate parts of the telescope being designed around them. Husband presented the first drawings of the proposed giant, fully steerable radio telescope in 1950. After refinements, these plans were detailed in a "Blue Book", which was presented to the DSIR on 20 March 1951; the proposal was approved in March 1952.

Construction began on 3 September 1952. The foundations for the telescope were completed on 21 May 1953 after being sunk 90 ft (27 m) into the ground. It then took until mid-March 1954 to get the double railway lines completed because of their required accuracy. The central pivot was delivered to the site on 11 May 1954, and the final bogie in mid-April 1955.

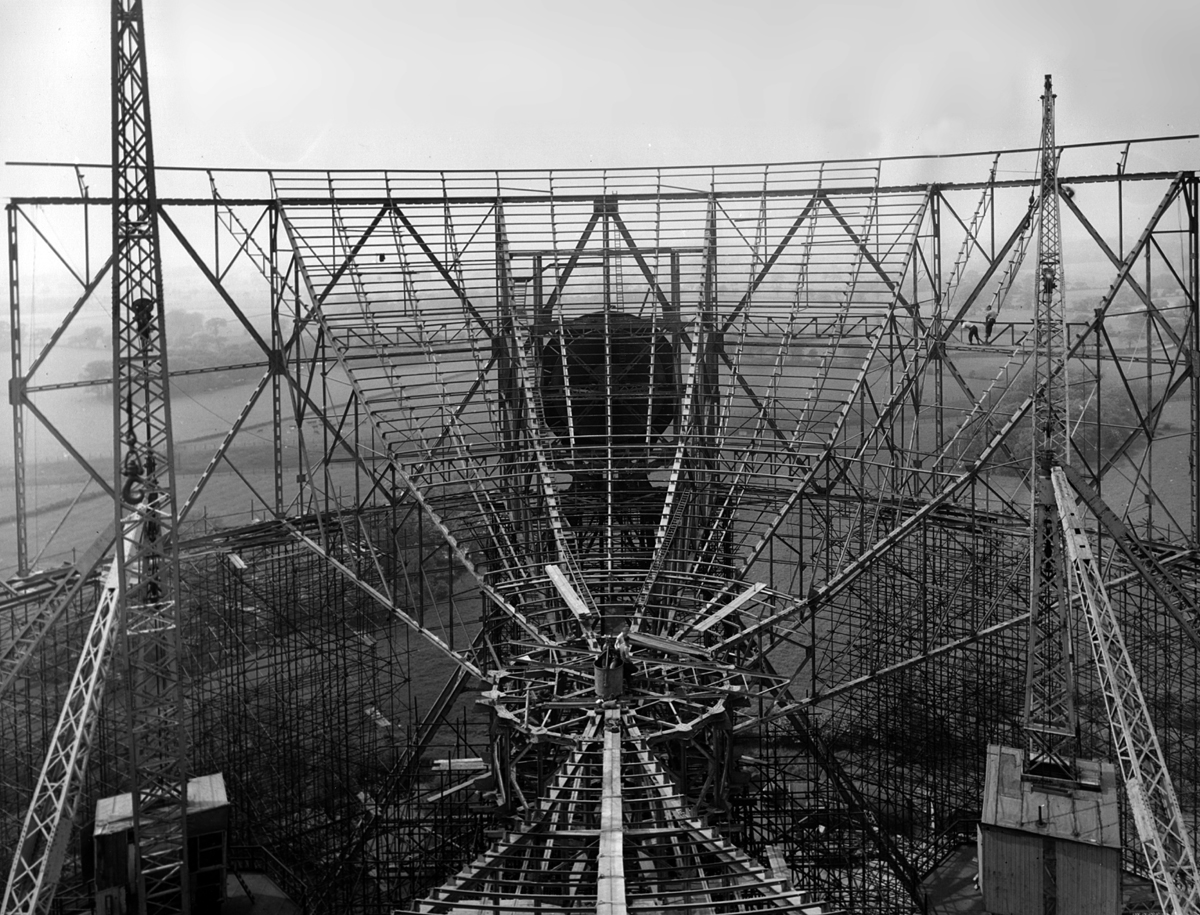
The Mark 1 under construction

The telescope bowl was originally going to have a wire mesh surface to observe at wavelengths between 1 and 10 meters (3.3 and 32.8 ft), so frequencies between 30 and 300 MHz; this was changed to a steel surface so that the telescope could observe at the 21 cm (8.3 in) hydrogen line, which was discovered in 1951. Also, in February 1954 Lovell and the Air Ministry met to see if funding could be made available for improving the accuracy of the dish so that it could be used on centimetre wavelengths, for research at these wavelengths for the Ministry as well as "other purposes". Although the funding was not ultimately made available from the Air Ministry, the planning process had already progressed, so this improvement was made anyway.

The telescope was constructed so that the bowl could be completely inverted. Originally, it was intended to use a movable tower at the base of the telescope to change the receivers at the focus. However, the movable tower was never built, jointly because of funding constraints and the fact that much of the receiver equipment was placed at the base of the telescope rather than at the focus. Instead, receivers were mounted on 50-foot (15-m) long steel tubes, which were then inserted by a winch into the top of the aerial tower while the bowl was inverted. The cables from the receivers then ran down the inside of this tube, which could then be connected when the telescope was pointed at the zenith. Associated receiver equipment could then be placed either in the small, swinging laboratory directly underneath the surface; in rooms at the tops of the two towers; at the base girders, or in the control building.

The telescope moved for the first time on 3 February 1957: by an inch. It was first moved azimuthally under power on 12 June 1957; the bowl was tilted under power for the first time on 20 June 1957. By the end of July the dish surface was completed, and first light was on 2 August 1957; the telescope did a drift scan across the Milky Way at 160 MHz, with the bowl at the zenith. The telescope was first controlled from the control room on 9 October 1957, by a purpose-built analogue computer.

There were large cost overruns with the telescope's construction, mainly the result of the steeply rising cost of steel during construction. The original grant for the telescope came jointly from the Nuffield Foundation and the government; this amounted to £335,000. The government increased its share of the funding several times as the cost of the telescope rose; other money came from private donations. The final part of the debt from the construction of the telescope, £50,000, was paid off by Lord Nuffield and the Nuffield Foundation on 25 May 1960 (partly because of the telescope's early, very public role in space probe tracking; see below), and Jodrell Bank observatory was renamed to the Nuffield Radio Astronomy Laboratories. The final total cost for the telescope was £700,000.

=== Upgrade to Mark IA ===
Shortly after the telescope was originally completed, Lovell and Husband started contemplating an upgrade to the telescope so that it had a more accurate surface, and was controlled by a digital computer. Plans for this upgrade were created by Husband and Co., and were presented to Lovell in April 1964. Their plans became more urgent when fatigue cracks were discovered in the elevation drive system in September 1967. The telescope was only expected to have an operational lifespan of 10 years, and Husband had been warning about the decay of the telescope since 1963. The appearance of fatigue cracks was the first of these problems that threatened to stop the telescope working; had they not been put right the elevation system could have failed and perhaps jammed. The telescope was therefore repaired and upgraded to become the Mark IA; the £400,000 of funding to do this was announced on 8 July 1968 by the SRC. The upgrade was carried out in three phases, phase 1 lasting between September 1968 and February 1969, phase 2 between September and November 1969 and phase 3 between August 1970 and November 1971.

The first phase saw the addition of an inner railway track, which was designed to take a third of the weight of the telescope. The outer railway track, which had been decaying and sinking over the previous years, was relaid in the second phase. Four bogies and their steelwork were added on the inner track, and the existing bogies on the outer track were overhauled.

The third phase saw the biggest changes; a new, more accurate bowl surface was constructed in front of the old surface, meaning that the telescope could be used on wavelengths as small as 6 cm (5 GHz), and the central "bicycle wheel" support was added. A new computer control system was also installed (reusing the Ferranti Argus 104 computer from the Mark II); fatigue cracks in the cones connecting the bowl to the towers were repaired, and the central antenna was lengthened and strengthened. In January 1972 the hoist carrying two engineers to the central antenna broke, gravely injuring one and killing the other.

The Mark IA upgrade was formally completed on 16 July 1974, when the telescope was handed back to the University of Manchester. Because of increases in the cost of steel during the upgrade, the final amount for the upgrade was £664,793.07.

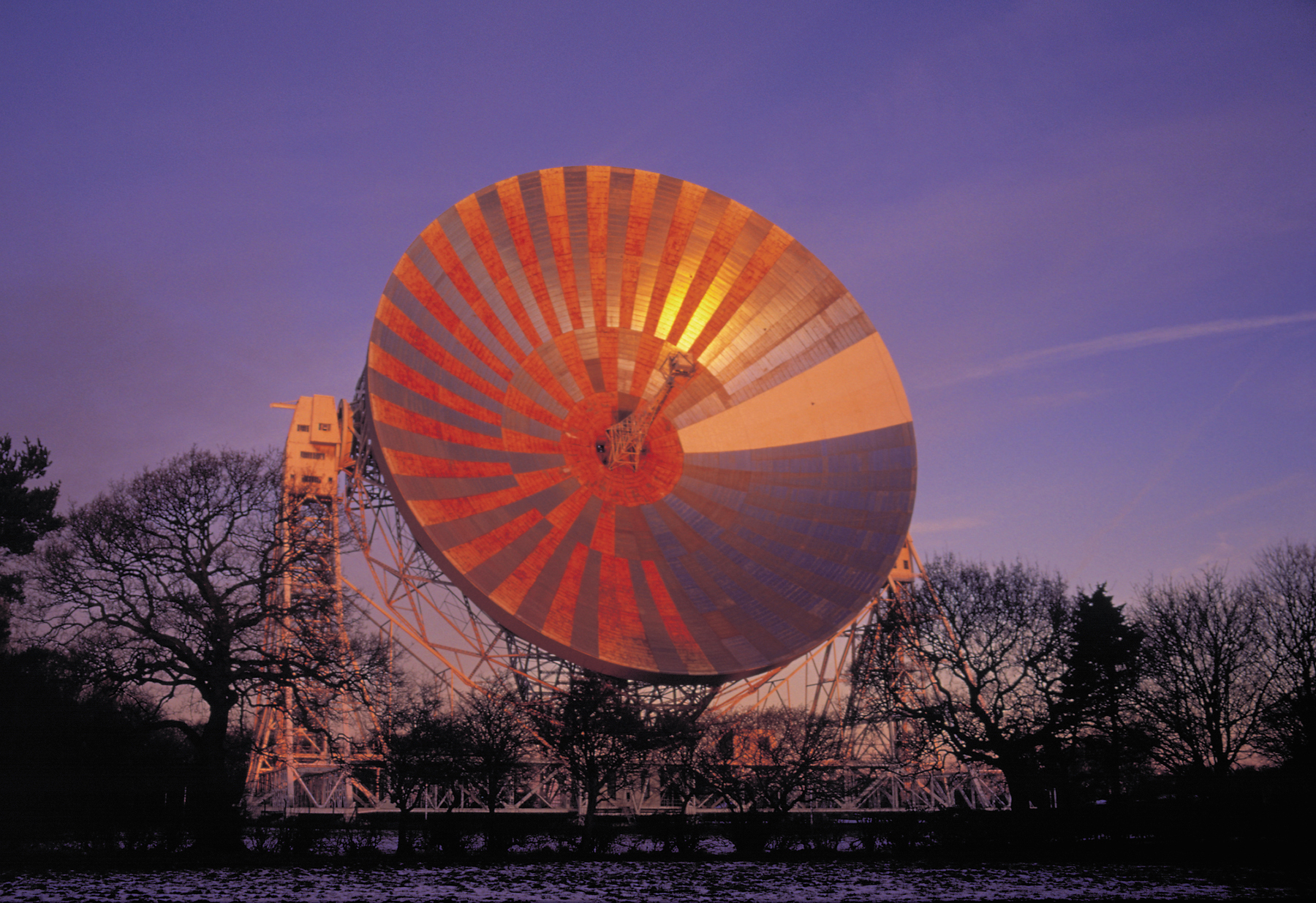
The Lovell telescope mid-resurfacing in 2002

=== Later upgrades and repairs ===
The Gale of January 1976 on 2 January brought winds of around 90 mph (140 km/h), which almost destroyed the telescope. The towers bowed, and one of the bearings connecting the dish to the towers slipped. After an expensive repair, diagonal bracing girders were added to the towers to prevent this happening again.

By the 1990s, the telescope surface was becoming badly corroded. In 2001–03, the telescope was resurfaced, increasing its sensitivity at 5 GHz by a factor of five. A holographic profiling technique was used on the surface, meaning that the surface works optimally at wavelengths of 5 cm (compared to 18 cm on the old surface). A new drive system was installed, which provides a much higher pointing accuracy. The outer track was relaid, and the focal tower was strengthened so that it could support heavier receivers.

In 2007 the telescope needed a new drive wheel, as one of the 64 original wheels had cracked; in 2008 another new steel tyre was needed after a second wheel cracked. These are the only two wheel changes needed since the telescope started operation in 1957.

The presence (as at 2010) of two breeding pairs of wild peregrine falcons (nesting one in each of the telescope's two support towers) prevents the nuisance of pigeon infestation (by droppings fouling, and their body heat affecting sensitive instrument readings) that some other radio telescopes suffer from.

Close to one of the buildings at the observatory stands a bust of Nicolaus Copernicus, Polish Renaissance-era mathematician and astronomer who developed the heliocentric model of the universe, with Sun, rather than the Earth, at its centre.

== Statistics ==
Specifications
Mass of telescope:	3,200 tonnes (3,200,000 kg; 7,100,000 lb)
Mass of bowl:	1,500 tonnes (1,500,000 kg; 3,300,000 lb)
Diameter of bowl:	76.2 metres (250 ft)
Surface area of bowl:	5,270 square metres (1.30 acres; 56,700 sq ft)
Collecting area of bowl:	4,560 square metres (1.13 acres; 49,100 sq ft)
Height of elevation axis:	50.5 m (165 ft 8 in)
Maximum height above ground:	89.0 m (292 ft 0 in)
Radius of wheel girders:	38.5 m (126 ft 4 in)
Outer diameter of railway track:	107.5 m (352 ft 8 in)
Amount of paint for 3 coats of the bowl:	5,300 L (1,200 imp gal)
Azimuthal drive power	Two 50 horse power electric motors, one at the foot of each tower.
Maximum drive rates	15 degrees per minute in azimuth 10 degrees a minute in elevation.

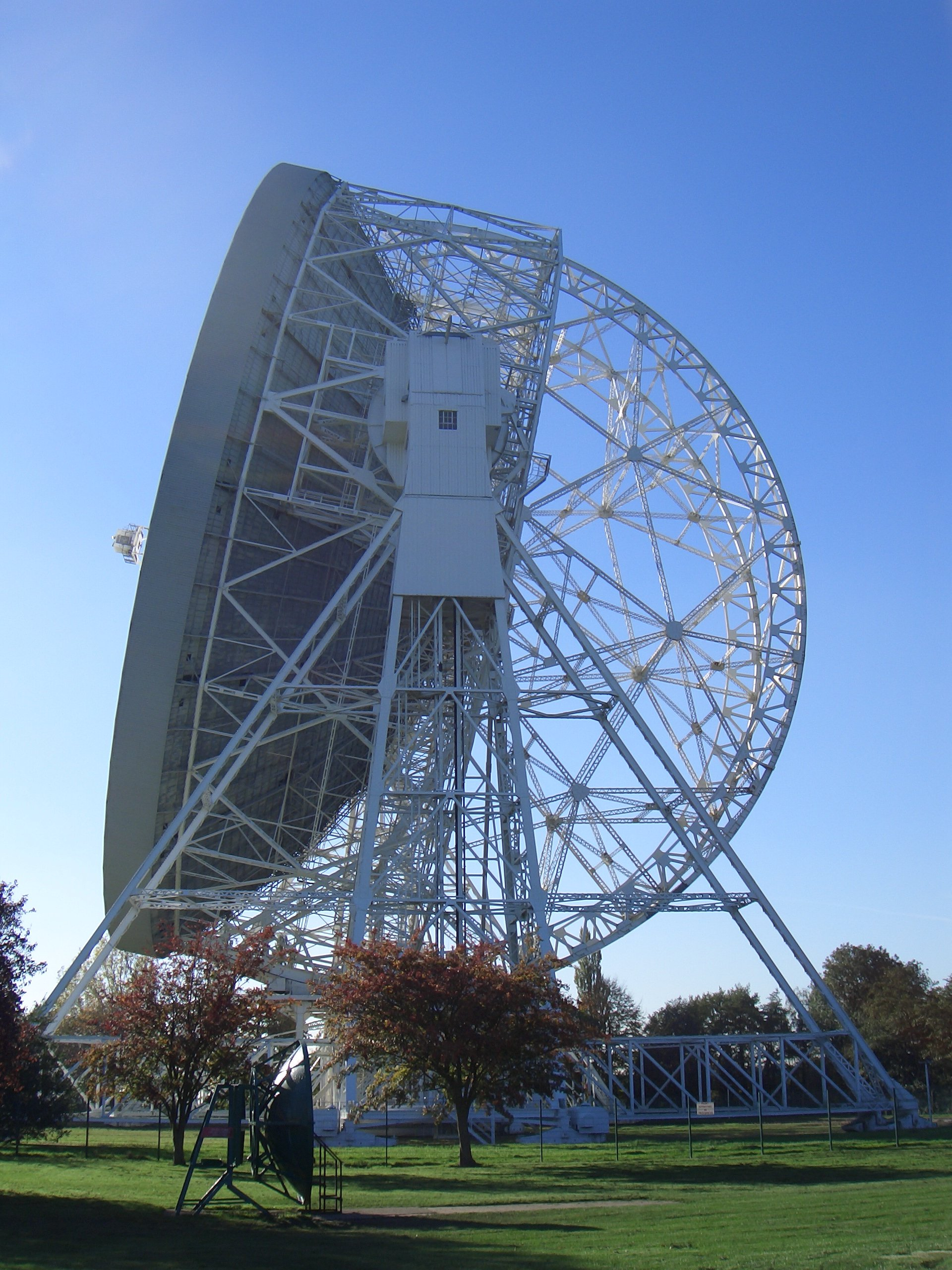
Side view

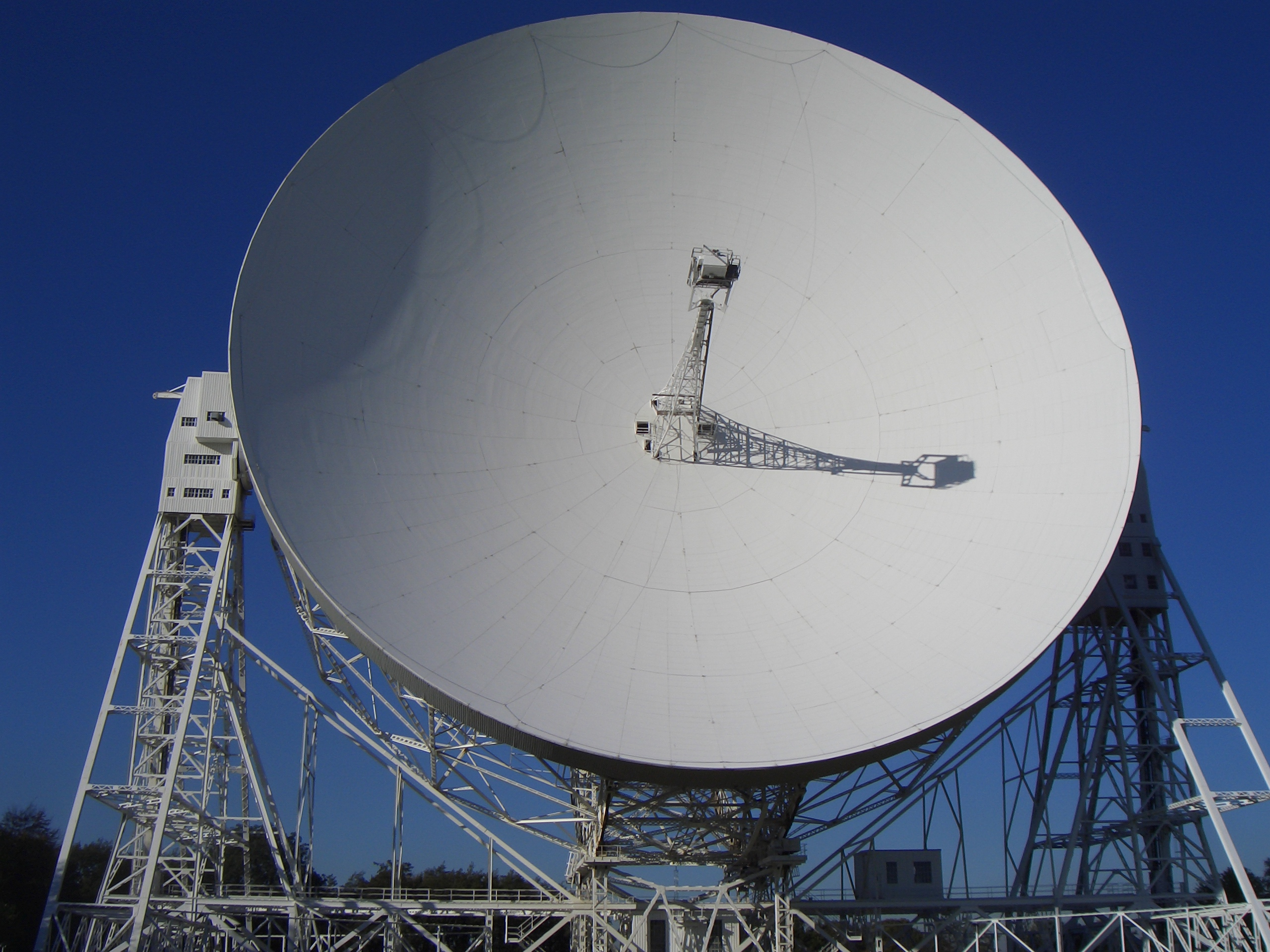
Telescope dish

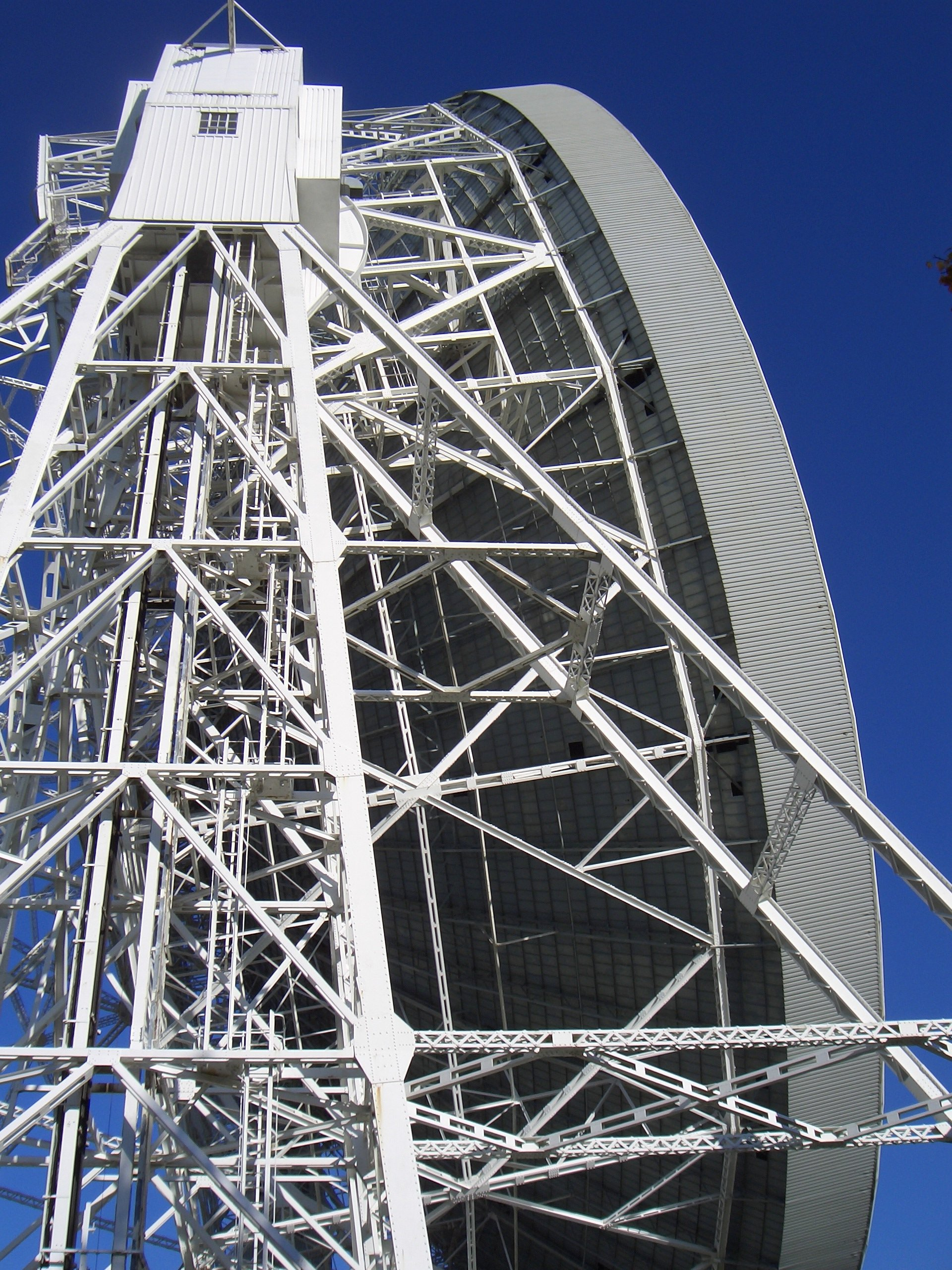
Support structure

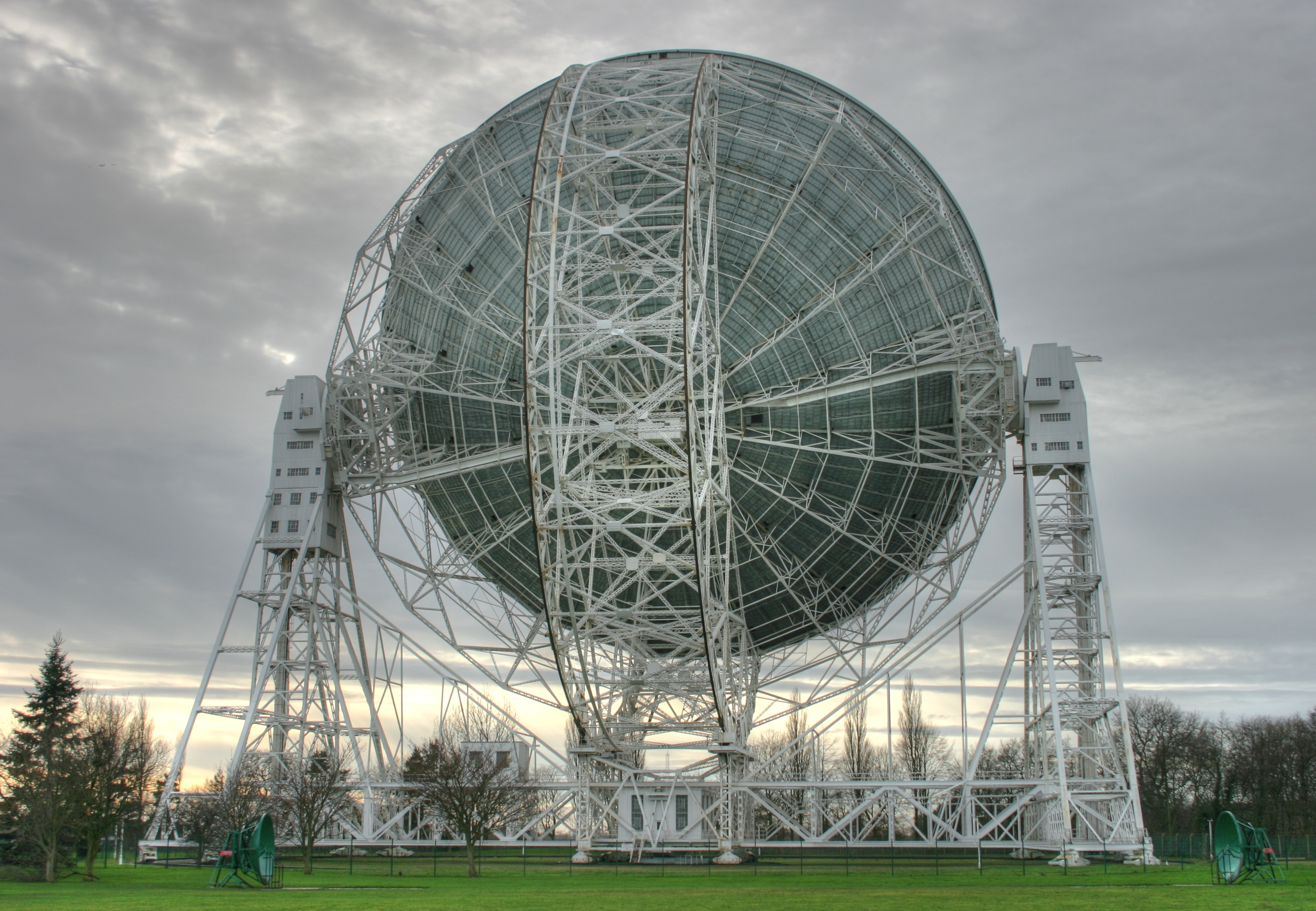
Rear

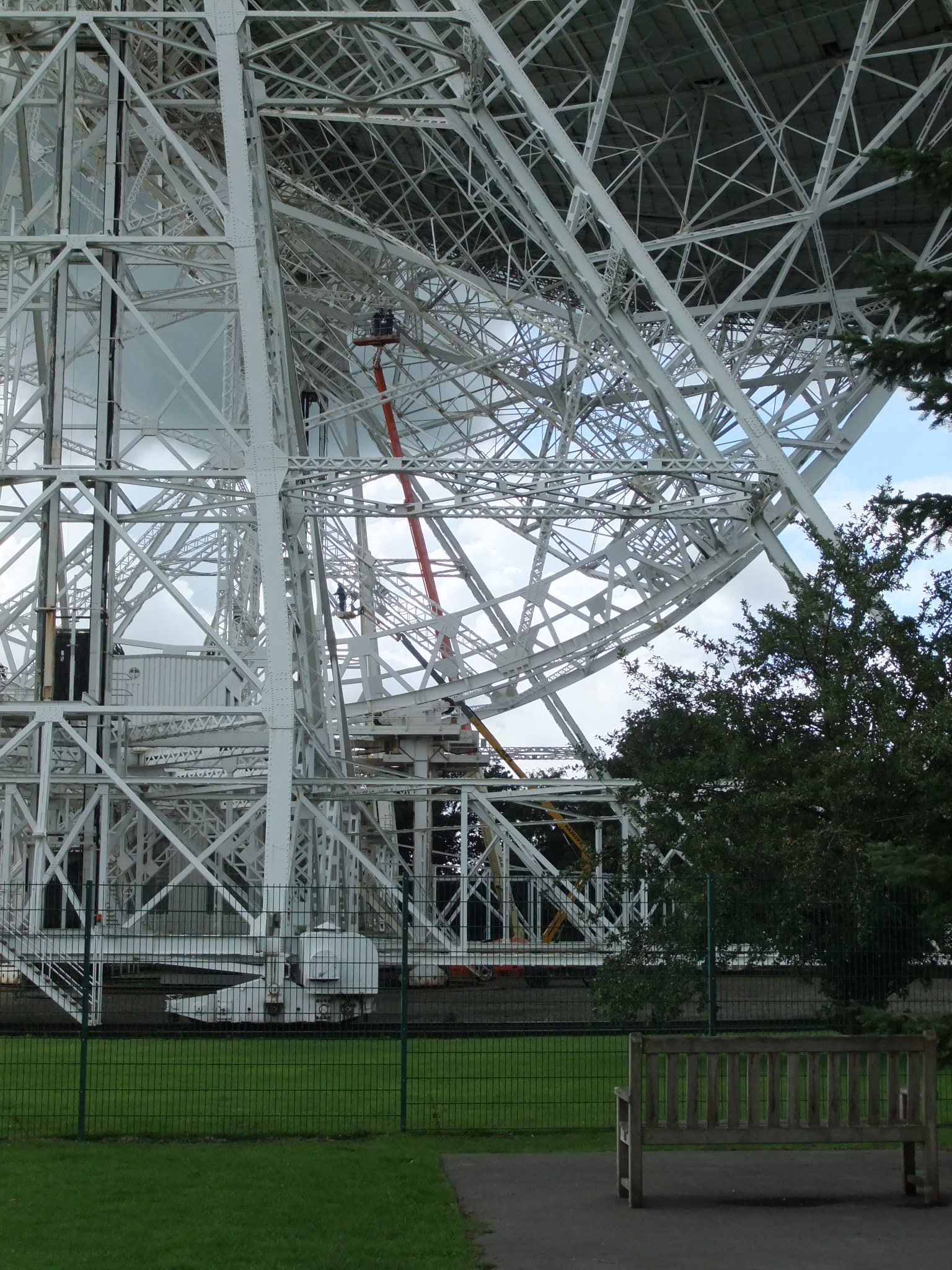
Work on the supports of the Jodrell Bank radio telescope, 12 August 2010

== Space probe tracking ==
=== Sputnik and artificial satellites ===
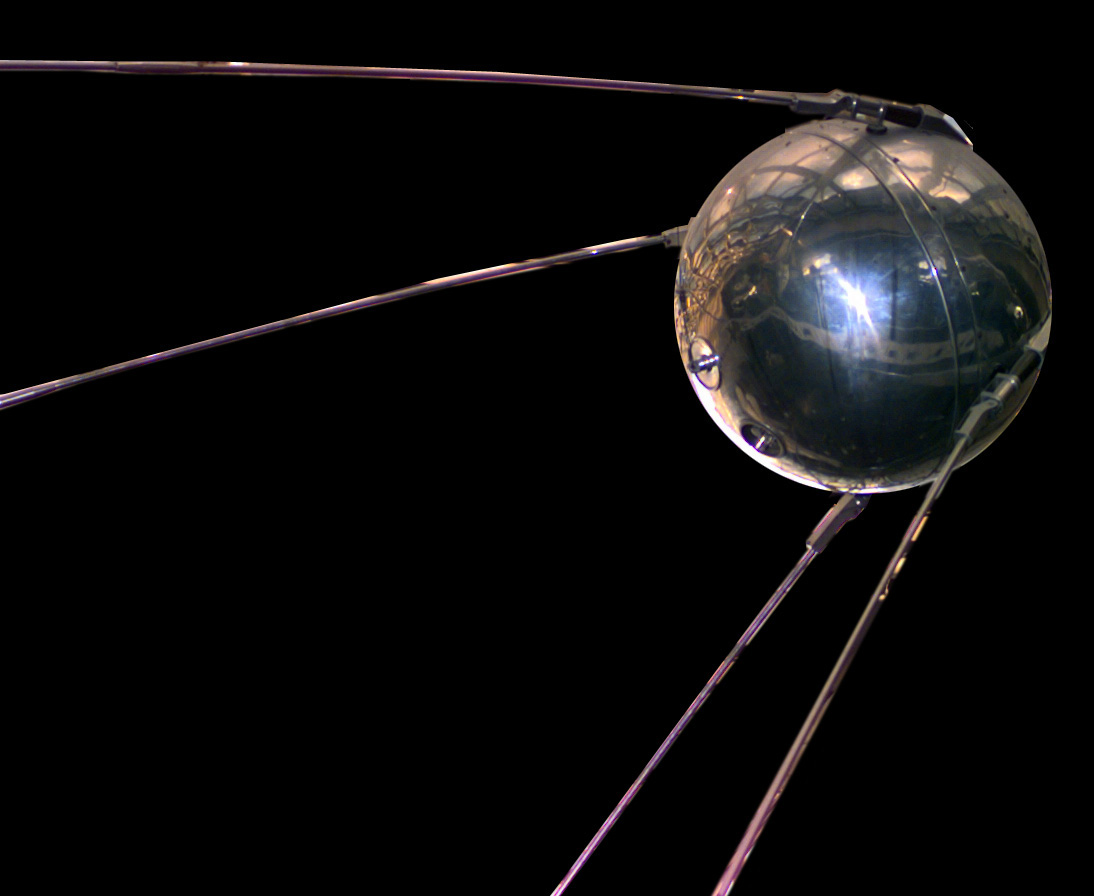
A model of Sputnik 1.

The telescope became operational in the summer of 1957, just in time for the launch of Sputnik 1, the world's first artificial satellite. While the transmissions from Sputnik itself could easily be picked up by a household radio, the Lovell Telescope was the only telescope capable of tracking Sputnik's booster rocket by radar; it first located it just before midnight on 12 October 1957. It also located Sputnik 2's carrier rocket at just after midnight on 16 November 1957.

The telescope also took part in some of the early work on satellite communication. In February and March 1963, the telescope transmitted signals via the moon and Echo II, a NASA balloon satellite at 750 km (470 mi) altitude, to the Zimenki Observatory in the USSR. Some signals were also relayed from the US to the USSR via Jodrell Bank.

=== The race to the Moon ===
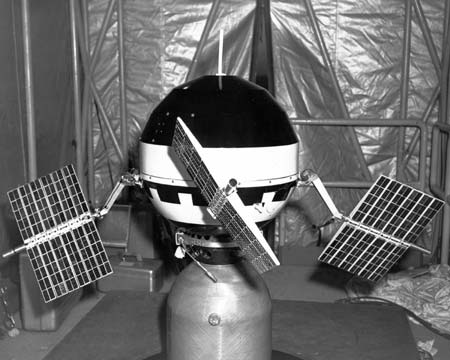
Pioneer 5 mounted to its Thor Able launcher.

The Lovell Telescope was used to track both Soviet and American probes aimed at the Moon in the late 1950s and early 1960s. The telescope tracked Pioneer 1 from 11 to 13 November 1958, Pioneer 3 in December 1958, and Pioneer 4 in March 1959. The telescope tracked Pioneer 5 between 11 March and 26 June 1960, and was also used to send commands to the probe, including the one to separate the probe from its carrier rocket and the ones to turn on the more powerful transmitter when the probe was 13 million kilometres (8 million miles) away. It also received data from Pioneer 5, and was the only telescope in the world capable of doing so at the time. The last signal was picked up from the probe at a distance of 36.2 million kilometres (22.5 million miles) on the 26 June 1960.

The telescope also tracked the Soviet Moon probes. An attempt to track Luna 1 failed. The telescope successfully tracked Lunik II from 13 to 14 September 1959 as it hit the moon; this was proven by the telescope by measuring the effect of the Moon's gravity on the probe, and Luna 3 around 4 October 1959. Also, the telescope tracked Luna 9 in February 1966, the first spacecraft to make a soft landing on the Moon. The telescope listened in on its facsimile transmission of photographs from the Moon's surface. The photos were sent to the British press – the probe transmitted, likely intentionally to increase chances of reception, in the international format for image transmission by newswire – and published before the Soviets themselves had made the photos public.

The telescope tracked Luna 10, a Russian satellite put into orbit around the Moon, in April 1966, and Zond 5 in September 1968, a Russian probe containing two tortoises that was launched at the Moon, around which it sling-shotted before returning to Earth. The telescope did not track Apollo 11, as it was tracking Luna 15 in July 1969. However, a 50 ft (15 m) telescope at Jodrell Bank was used at the same time to track Apollo 11.

=== Venus probes ===
The telescope possibly detected signals from Venera 1, a Russian satellite en route to Venus, during 19–20 May 1961. However, it was not possible to confirm the origin of the signals. A few years later, in December 1962, the telescope tracked and received data from Mariner 2. On 18 October 1967, the telescope received signals from, and tracked, Venera 4, a Russian probe to Venus.

=== Mars probes ===
The telescope tracked Mars 1 in 1962–63, and Mars 2 and Mars 3 in 1971 (amidst the upgrade of the telescope to the Mark IA). In more recent years, it has also searched for several lost Mars spacecraft, including NASA's Mars Observer spacecraft in 1993, Mars Polar Lander in 2000, and the Beagle 2 lander on Mars in 2003. However, it did not succeed in locating any of them.

=== ICBM watchdog ===
As a stopgap measure while RAF Fylingdales was being built, the telescope was on standby for "Project Verify" (also known by the codewords "Lothario" and "Changlin") between April 1962 and September 1963. During strategic alerts, a 'pulse transmitter, receiver and display equipment' could be connected to the telescope to scan known Russian launch sites for indications of launches of ICBMs and/or IRBMs. During the Cuban Missile Crisis in October 1962, the telescope was discreetly turned towards the Iron Curtain to provide a few minutes' warning of any missiles that might have been launched.

== Scientific observations ==
When the telescope was proposed, a series of objectives for the telescope's observations were set out. These included:

- Surveys of galactic and extragalactic radio emission
- Observations of the Sun
- Radar echoes from the planets
- Investigation of meteor detections
- Observations of the Gegenschein
- Studies of the Aurora
- Detections of radio reflections from cosmic ray ionization in the atmosphere

However, the actual observations made with the telescope differ from these original objectives, and are outlined in the following sections.

=== Solar system ===
In Autumn 1958, the telescope was used to bounce "Hellos" off the Moon for a demonstration in Lovell's third Reith Lecture. The telescope was also used to receive messages bounced off the Moon (a "moonbounce") as part of the 50th anniversary First Move festival. In April 1961, a radar echo from Venus was achieved using the telescope while the planet was at a close approach, confirming measurements of the distance of the planet made by American telescopes.

=== 21cm hydrogen line ===
The 21 cm hydrogen line was discovered during the telescope's construction; the telescope was subsequently redesigned so that it could observe at that frequency. Using this line emission, hydrogen clouds both in the Milky Way galaxy and in other galaxies can be observed; for example, the telescope discovered a large cloud around the M81 and M82 galaxies. The motion of these clouds either towards or away from us either redshifts or blueshifts the line, allowing the velocity to the cloud to be measured. This provides a probe of the internal dynamics of galaxies, and can also provide a measurement of the rate of expansion of the universe.

=== Masers ===
In 1963, the telescope discovered OH emissions from star-forming regions and giant stars; the first astronomical masers. OH masers emit on four frequencies around 18 cm (7.1 in), which are easily observable on the telescope. As part of MERLIN, the telescope is regularly used to construct maps of maser regions.

=== Pulsars ===
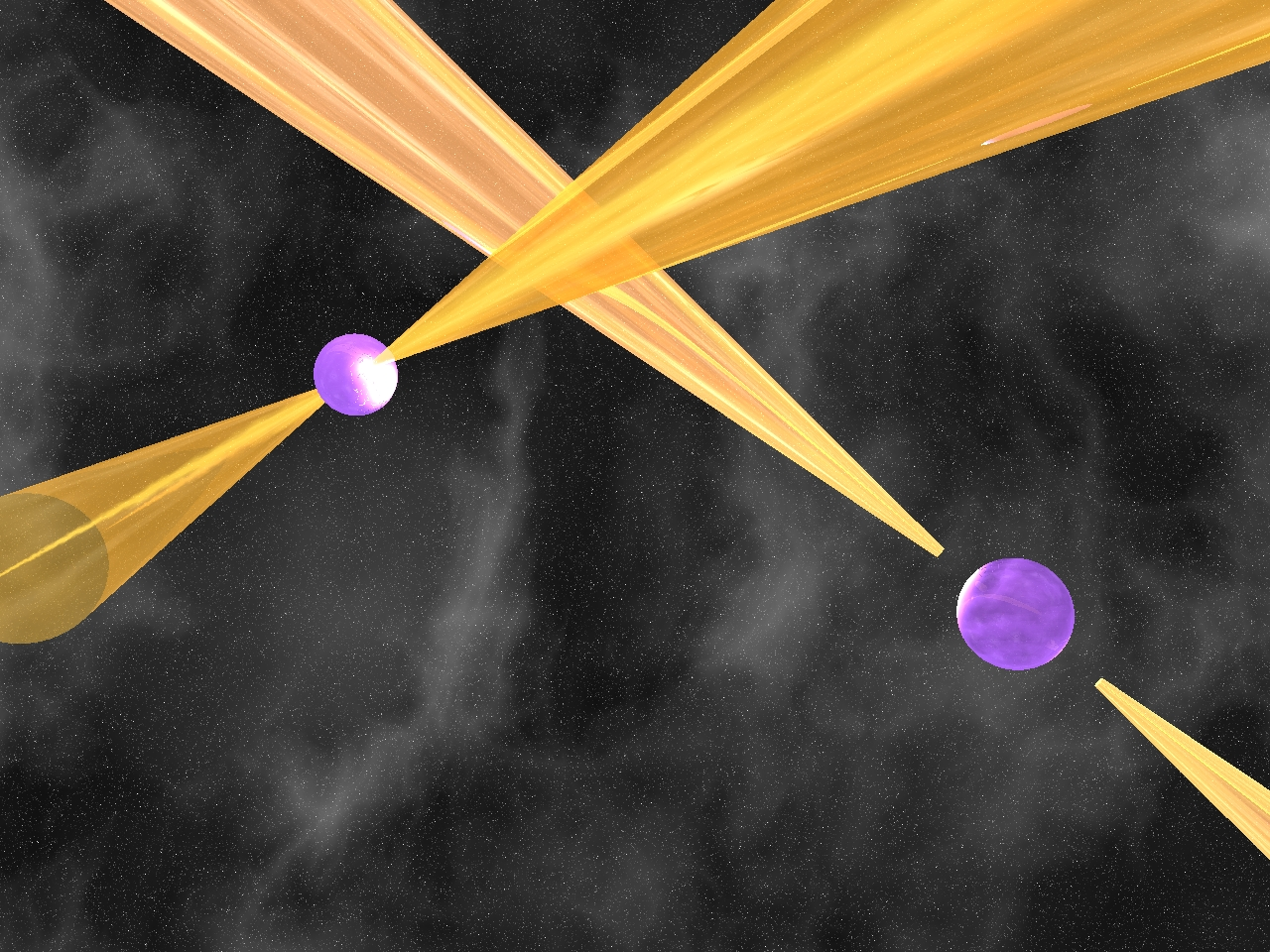
An artist's impression of the double pulsar, PSR J0737-3039.

In 1968, the telescope observed the coordinates of the recently discovered pulsar, confirming its existence and investigating the dispersion measure. It was also used to make the first detection of polarization of the pulsar's radiation. This marked the start of a substantial amount of work investigating pulsars at Jodrell, which is still ongoing. In the 30 years following the discovery of pulsars, the telescope discovered over 100 new pulsars (and astronomers at Jodrell Bank discovered around 2/3 of the total number using the Lovell and other telescopes). 300 pulsars are regularly observed using either the Lovell, or a nearby 42-foot (13-m) dish.

The telescope was involved in the discovery of millisecond pulsars, and also discovered the first pulsar in a globular cluster in 1986: a millisecond pulsar in the Messier 28 globular cluster. In September 2006, the results of three years of observing a double pulsar, PSR J0737-3039, with the Lovell telescope, as well as with the Parkes and Green Bank Telescopes, were announced; these confirmed that the general theory of relativity is accurate to 99.5%.

=== Gravitational lensing ===
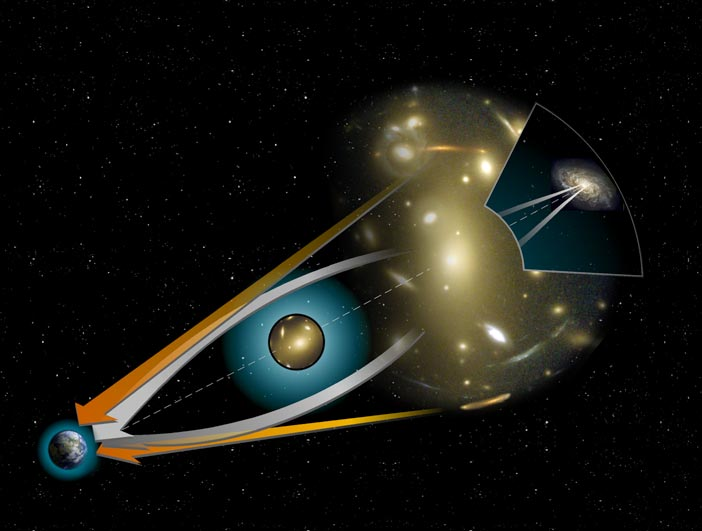
An illustration of a gravitational lens.

Between 1972 and 1973, the telescope was used for "a detailed survey of the radio sources in a limited area of the sky … up to the sensitivity limit of the instrument". Among the objects catalogued was the first gravitational lens, which was confirmed optically in 1979 after its position was found to coincide with a pair of faint blue stars by using the Mark I as an interferometer with the Mark II. The telescope was also involved in the detection of the first Einstein ring in 1998, in conjunction with observations made with the Hubble Space Telescope.

=== Quasars and interferometry ===
The early investigation into the size and nature of quasars drove the development of interferometry techniques in the 1950s; the Lovell telescope had an advantage because of its large collecting area, meaning that it could make high-sensitivity interferometer measurements relatively quickly. As a result, the telescope featured heavily in the discovery of quasars.

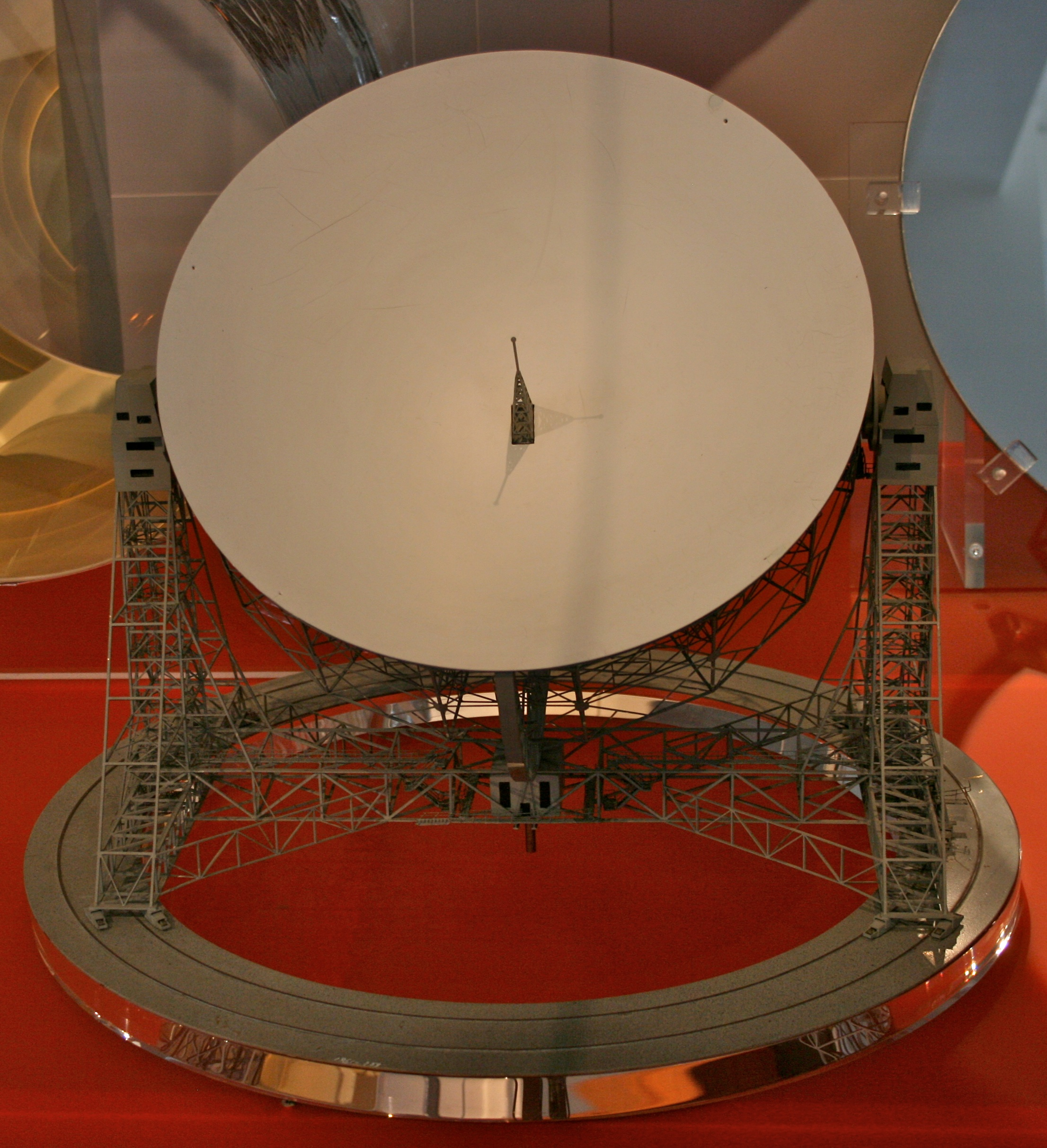
A model of the Mark I telescope at the Science Museum, London

Interferometry at Jodrell Bank started before the Lovell telescope was constructed, using the Transit Telescope with a 35 m^{2} broadside array to determine the size of radio-loud nebulae. Once construction of the Lovell telescope was complete, the broadside array was put on a steerable mount and the pair were used as a tracking radio interferometer. This was then used to determine the 2D shape of quasars on the sky. In the summer of 1961, a 25-foot (8-m) diameter paraboloid telescope was constructed (of aluminium tubing and mounted on the rotating structure of an old defence radar). This was then used as a steerable interferometer with the Mark I, with a resolution of 0.3 arcseconds, to determine the sizes of some high-redshift (z~0.86) quasars.

The Mark II telescope once constructed was also used as an interferometer with the Lovell telescope. This has a baseline of 425 metres (1,394 feet) (meaning that it can synthesize a telescope with 425 m diameter), giving it a resolution of around 0.5 arcminutes. This telescope pair has been used to carry out survey work, and to determine the positions of faint radio objects. Also, one of the drivers behind the construction of the Mark III was to use it as an interferometer with the Mark I to carry out a survey of radio sources.

The telescope took part in the first transatlantic interferometer experiment in 1968, with other telescopes being those at Algonquin and Penticton in Canada. It was first used as an interferometer with the Arecibo radio telescope in 1969.

In 1980, it was used as part of the new MERLIN array with a series of smaller radio telescopes controlled from Jodrell Bank. With baselines of up to 217 km (135 mi), this gave a resolution around 0.05 arcminutes. An upgraded version of this became a national facility in 1992. It has also been used in Very Long Baseline Interferometry, with telescopes across Europe (the European VLBI Network), giving a resolution of around 0.001 arcseconds. Around half of the telescope's observing time is now spent doing interferometry with other telescopes. It is planned that the telescope will work as part of an interferometer with the Radioastron (Russian) and VLBI Space Observatory Programme (Japanese) orbital radio satellites, providing yet larger baselines and higher resolutions.

=== Other notable observations ===
The telescope was used as a follow-up instrument for possible SETI detections made at Arecibo between 1998 and the end of 2003. No signals were detected. In February 2005, astronomers using the Lovell Telescope discovered the galaxy VIRGOHI21 that appears to be made almost entirely of dark matter.

== In popular culture ==
- A 1:200 scale model of the telescope, made in 1961, resides in the Science Museum, London.
- In 1962, the telescope was mentioned in a sci-fi novel A for Andromeda, by Fred Hoyle and John Elliot.
- The 1981 Doctor Who serial Logopolis, filmed at Crowsley Park, used a model of the Lovell Telescope as the Pharos Project, from which the Doctor, played by Tom Baker, fell and regenerated. The model was based on the Mark I telescope, but it also featured some modifications from the Mark IA telescope such as the rim around the edge of the dish.
- Sophie Aldred portrayed the Seventh Doctor's companion Ace, standing on both the superstructure and dish in the 1990 Doctor Who educational special "Search Out Science: Search Out Space".
- In 1992, the telescope was featured on the cover of Sub Sub's "Space Face" single.
- The telescope also made a brief appearance in the film version of The Hitchhiker's Guide to the Galaxy in 2005.
- Four bands have shot music videos or photos in the bowl of the telescope: Oasis in June 1994 by Steve Double, D:Ream in 1995 ("Party Up the World"), Placebo in 2003 ("The Bitter End"), and Public Service Broadcasting in 2015 ("Sputnik"). Long shots of the telescope feature in the music video of "Secret Messages" by Electric Light Orchestra.
- The Royal Mail depicted the telescope as "J for Jodrell Bank" in their alphabetical landmarks stamp series; it has also previously featured on stamps from Haiti, Hungary, Ascension Island, Barbuda, Liechtenstein and Tanzania.
- In an August 1981 episode of Coronation Street the telescope was seen. Len and Rita Fairclough brought the boy they were fostering to see the telescope.

== Notes and references ==
=== Books ===
- Lovell, Bernard (1968). The Story of Jodrell Bank. Oxford University Press. ISBN 978-0-19-217619-6.
- Lovell, Bernard (1973). Out of the Zenith: Jodrell Bank 1957–1970. Oxford University Press. ISBN 978-0-19-217624-0.
- Lovell, Bernard (1985). The Jodrell Bank Telescopes. Oxford University Press. ISBN 978-0-19-858178-9.
- Lovell, Bernard (1990). Astronomer by Chance. London: Macmillan. ISBN 978-0-333-55195-0.
- Piper, Roger. The Story of Jodrell Bank (Carousel ed.). London: Carousel. ISBN 978-0-552-54028-5.

=== Journal articles ===
- Lovell, Bernard (1957). "The Jodrell Bank Radio Telescope". Nature. 180 (4576): 60–62. Bibcode:1957Natur.180...60L. doi:10.1038/180060a0. S2CID 21214658.
- Rowson, B. (1963). "High resolution observations with a tracking radio interferometer". MNRAS. 125 (2): 177. Bibcode:1963MNRAS.125..177R. doi:10.1093/mnras/125.2.177.
- Spinardi, G. (August 2006). "Science, Technology, and the Cold War: The Military Uses of the Jodrell Bank Radio Telescope". Cold War History. 6 (3): 279–300. doi:10.1080/14682740600795428. S2CID 154984982.

== See also ==
- Grade I listed buildings in Cheshire
- Listed buildings in Goostrey
