= Mark III (radio telescope) =

Radio telescope in Cheshire, North West England

- Location(s): Cheshire, England
- Coordinates: 53°06′46″N 2°35′51″W
- Location of Mark III

The Mark III was a portable and fully steerable radio telescope located at Wardle, near Nantwich, Cheshire in the north-west of England. Constructed in 1966, it was remotely controlled from Jodrell Bank Observatory, and was mainly used as part of the MERLIN radio telescope network. It was designed by Charles Husband at the instigation of Bernard Lovell.

== Technical specifications ==
Funding for the telescope was obtained in 1963 from the DSIR. The telescope was designed by Husband and Co. consulting engineers, and was constructed by Fairey Engineering. It started observations in July 1967. The telescope could be controlled either locally, or by remote control over UHF and microwave links from Jodrell Bank Observatory (normally the latter).

Similar to the Mark II, it had an elliptical dish with a major axis of 125 ft/38.1m and a minor axis of 83 ft 4 in/25.4m. Unlike the Mark II, however, the dish is constructed of a wire mesh, with the wires 1-inch (25 mm) apart set to an accuracy of 0.5 inches (13 mm). When pointed to the horizon, the telescope was 81% efficient at wavelengths of 21 cm (the hydrogen line), dropping to 45% at 11 cm. When the bowl was pointed to the horizon, the structure deformed slightly under gravity, meaning that the telescope becomes 14% efficient at 11 cm.

The focus cabin was an ~8 foot cube, also similar to the Mark II, supported by four steel girders. It could be accessed via a ladder up one of the girders, which could be climbed when the bowl of the telescope was directed towards the horizon.

The telescope was steered in azimuth and elevation by hydraulic drive systems. Two of the six bogies on which the telescope sat were driven, and motion in elevation was done using two 16-foot (4.9 m) long hydraulic pistons. Both were driven by a 5 horse power electric motor, at up to 5 degrees per minute. The drive system was protected using over-pressure alarms, cut-outs and relief valves, as well as two alarms (one at the telescope, one at Jodrell).

The main aim for the telescope when constructed was to use it in conjunction with the Lovell Telescope as a fully steerable interferometer to determine the sizes of radio sources. It was not known what size the radio sources would be, and so the optimal telescope separation was not known (the separation is inversely proportional to the resolution of the interferometer). As a result, the telescope was built such that it could be completely disassembled and reassembled on a new site within 6 months.

The baseline between the telescope and the Lovell Telescope was 24 km, giving a resolution ranging between 0.2 and 17 arcseconds depending on the frequency that was being observed at.

In 1996, it was decommissioned due to its age and lack of sensitivity compared with modern telescopes. It was subsequently dismantled and sold for scrap.

== References and further reading ==
=== Books ===
Lovell, Bernard (1985). The Jodrell Bank Telescopes. Oxford University Press. ISBN 0-19-858178-5.

=== Journal articles ===
Palmer, H. P.; B. Rowson (1968). "The Jodrell Bank Mark III Radio Telescope". Nature. 217 (5123): 21–22. Bibcode:1968Natur.217...21P. doi:10.1038/217021a0.
