= Animal pound =

Place where stray livestock were impounded

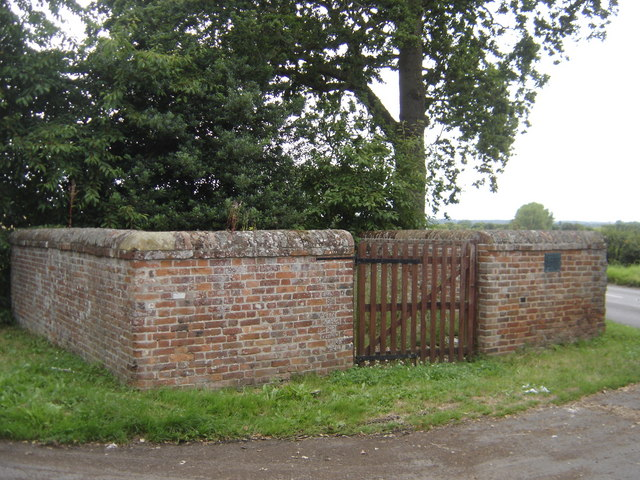
North Elmham village pound, Norfolk

An animal pound is a place where stray livestock were impounded. Animals were kept in a dedicated enclosure, until claimed by their owners, or sold to cover the costs of impounding.

== Etymology ==
The terms "pinfold" and "pound" are Saxon in origin. Pundfald and pund both mean an enclosure. There appears to be no difference between a pinfold and a village pound.

The person in charge of the pinfold was the "pinder", giving rise to the surname Pinder.

== Village pound or pinfold ==
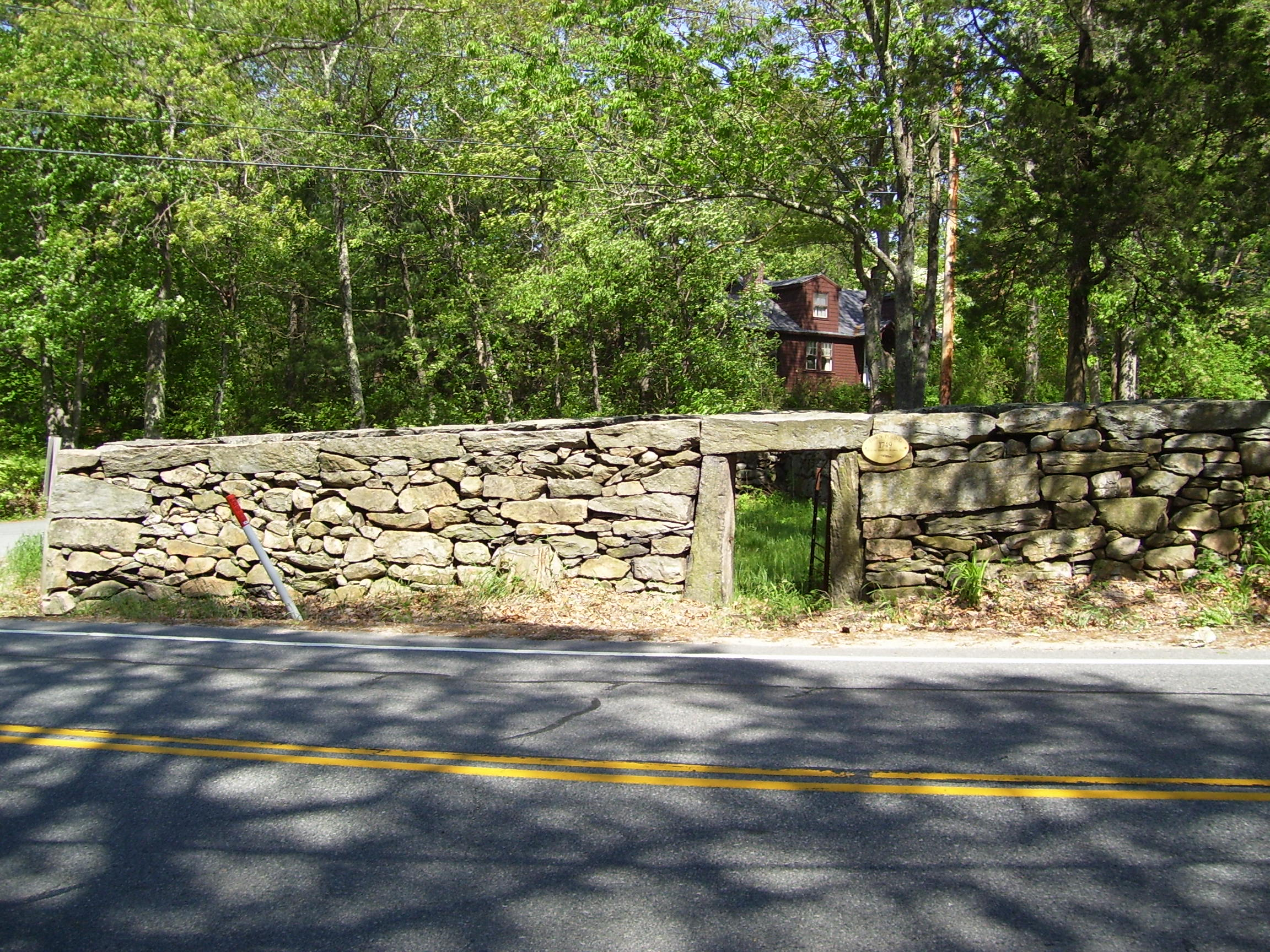
The town pound of Glocester, Rhode Island in New England, US, c. 1748

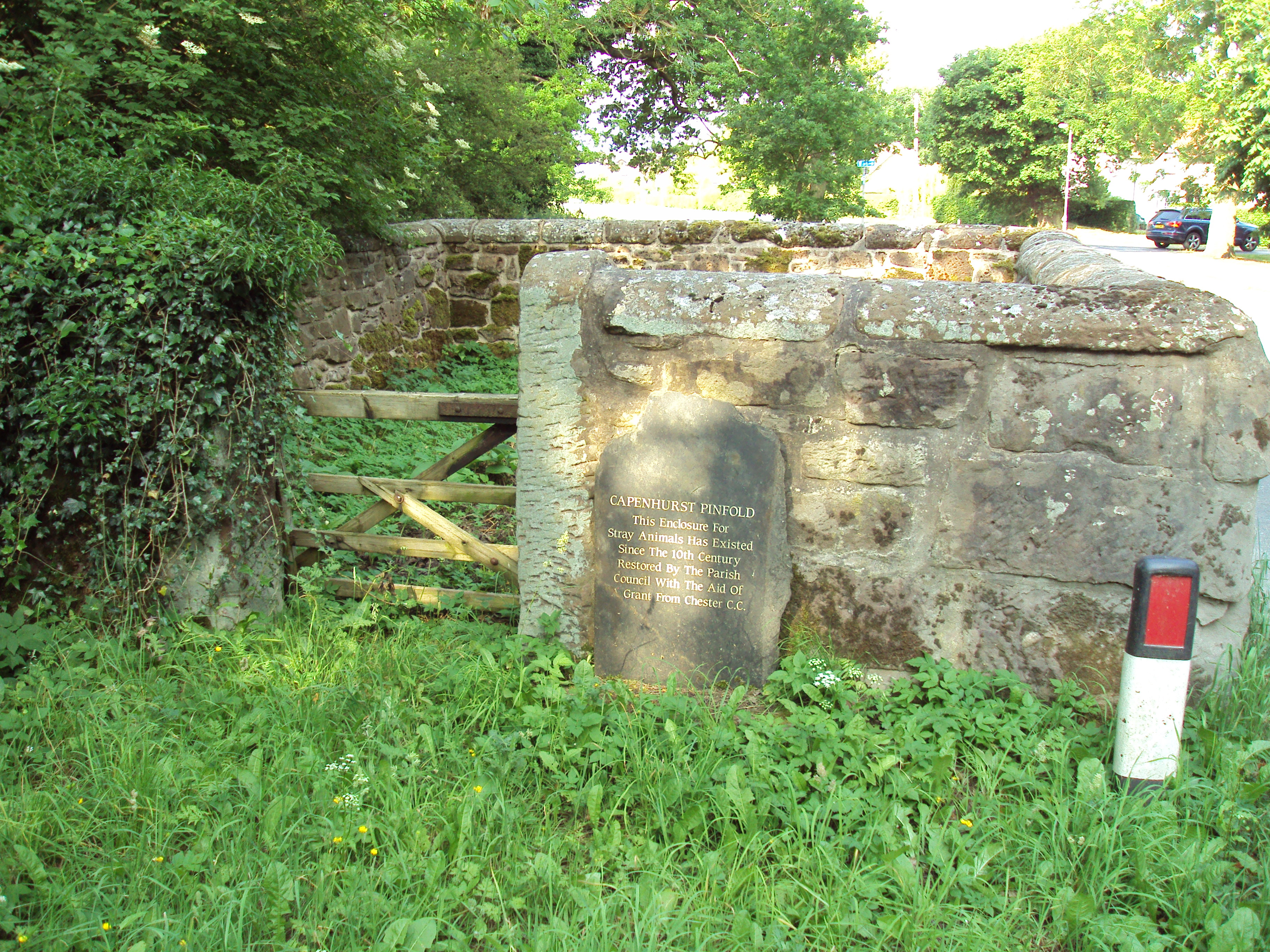
Capenhurst pinfold, Cheshire. A pinfold has existed on this site since the 10th century.

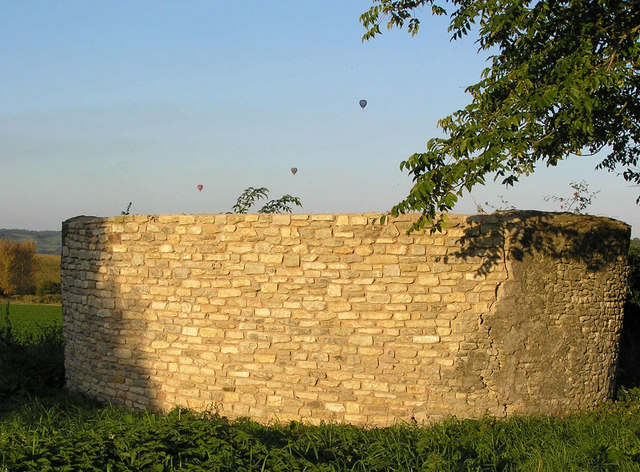
Circular village pound in Stanton Prior, Somerset. (Above the pound are hot-air balloons taking off from Bath (6 miles or 9.7 km to the north-east.)

The village pound was a feature of most English medieval villages, and they were also found in the English colonies of North America and in Ireland.

A high-walled and lockable structure served several purposes; the most common use was to hold stray sheep, pigs and cattle until they were claimed by the owners, usually for the payment of a fine or levy. The pound could be as small as 20 square metres (225 sq ft) or as big as 0.20 hectares (1/2 acre) and may be circular or square. Early pounds had just briar hedges, but most were built in stone or brick, making them more stock-proof. The size and shape of village pounds varies. Some are four-sided—rectangular, square and irregular—while others are circular. In size they vary from a few square metres (some square feet) to over 0.5 hectares (1.2 acres). Pounds are known to date from the medieval period. By the 16th century most villages and townships would have had a pound. Most of what remain today would date from the 16th and 17th centuries. Some are listed buildings, but most have fallen into disrepair.

The Sussex County Magazine in 1930 stated:

Nearly every village once had its pound for stray cattle, pigs, geese, etc. to be driven into and there kept at the expense of the owner, till such time as he should pay the fine (the amount claimed by the person on whose land they had strayed, for damage done), and the fee to the pound keeper, man or sometimes woman, for feeding and watering the same.

If not claimed in three weeks, the animals were driven to the nearest market and sold, the proceeds going to the impounder and pound-keeper. An ingenious form of receipt was sometimes used. The person who found the animals on his land cut a stick and made notches, one for every beast, and then split the stick down the centre of the notches so that half each notch appeared on each stick; one half he kept, the other he gave to the pound-keeper.

When the owner came to redeem his property and had paid for the damage done, the impounder gave him his half stick. He took this to the pound-keeper, and if the two pieces tallied, it proved he had paid and his beast was freed. Hence the word tally-stick and the pound-keeper being referred to as the tallyman.

Although pounds are most common to England, there are also examples in other countries. In Americans and Their Forests: a Historical Geography, author Michael Williams writes: "There was hardly a town in eighteenth-century New England without its town pound..."

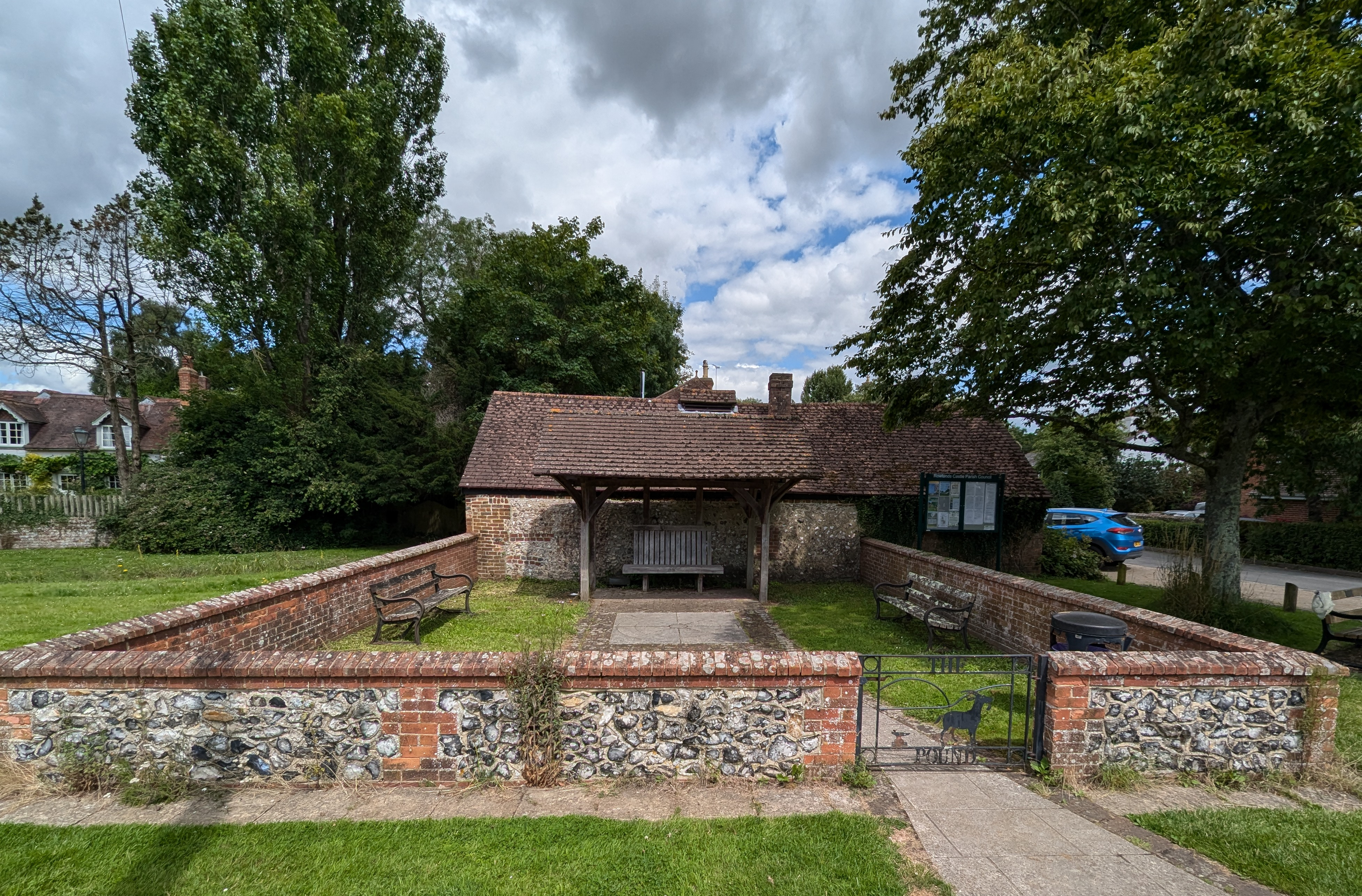
The animal pound at Finchdean, Hampshire, England

In some mountainous areas of northern Spain (such as Cantabria or Asturias) some similar enclosures are traditionally used to protect beehives from bear attacks.

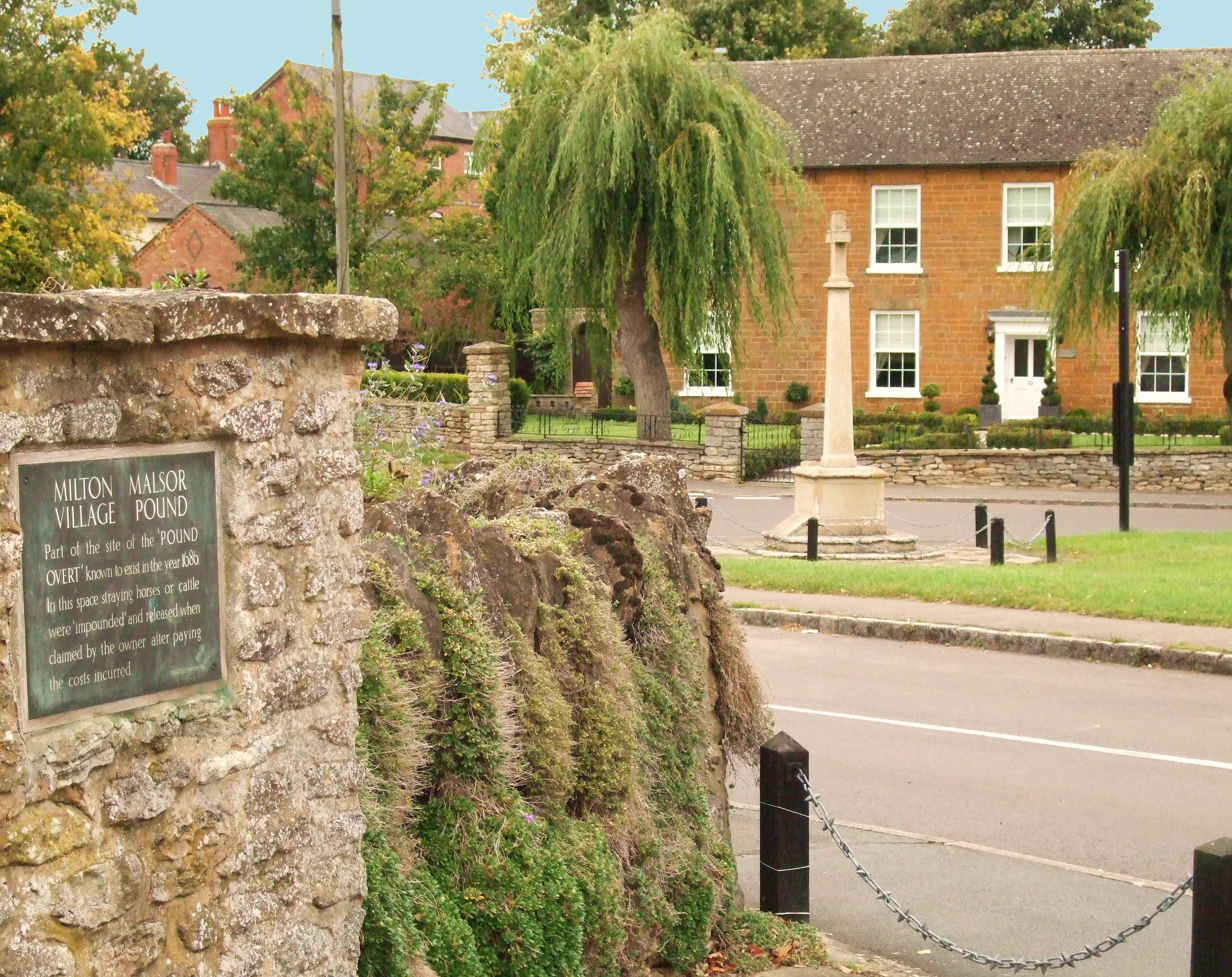
Milton Malsor village pound, Northamptonshire, England, dating from at least 1686

== Cultural references ==
The artist Andy Goldsworthy has produced a series of sculptures in several of the pinfolds in Cumbria.

== See also ==
- Kraal
- Pen (enclosure)
- Scarisbrick, Lancashire, in which is the hamlet of Pinfold
- List of extant pinfolds in Cheshire
- Village lock-up
- Poundmaster
