= Mark II (radio telescope) =

Radio telescope in Cheshire, England

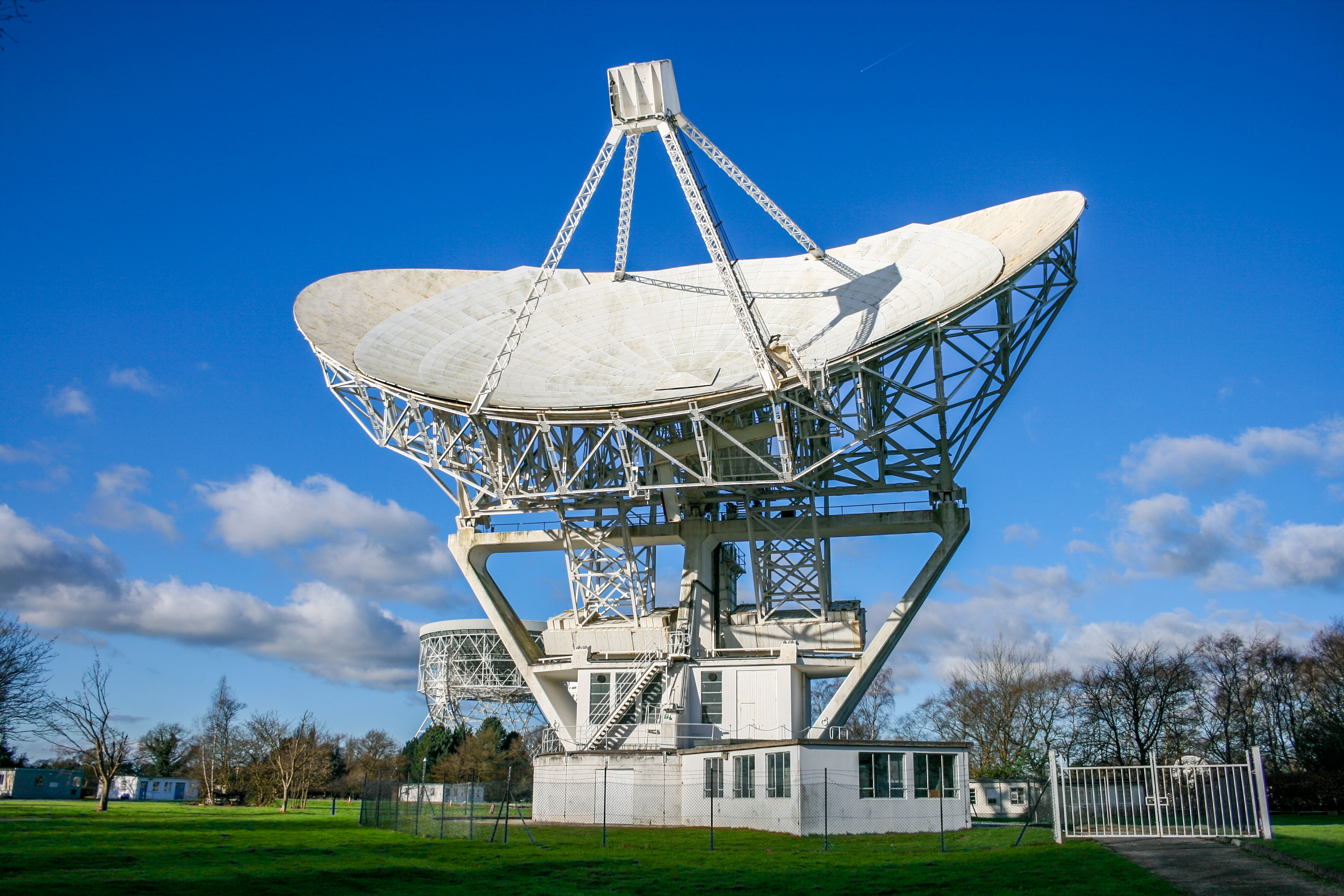
- The Mark II radio telescope at Jodrell Bank
- Location(s): Lower Withington, Cheshire East, Cheshire, North West England, England
- Coordinates: 53°14′02″N 2°18′14″W
- Altitude: 81.7 m (268 ft)
- Diameter: 38.1 m (125 ft 0 in)
- Focal length: 12.2 m (40 ft 0 in)
- Location of Mark II
- Related media on Commons

The Mark II is a radio telescope located at Jodrell Bank Observatory, near Goostrey, Cheshire, in the north-west of England. It was built on the site of the 218 ft (66.4 m) Transit Telescope. Construction was completed in 1964. The telescope's design was used as the basis of the 85 ft (26 m) Goonhilly 1 dish, and the Mark III telescope is also based on a similar design.

The original dish surface of the telescope was more accurate than the Lovell Telescope's at the time it was made, meaning that it was better suited for observations at higher frequencies. As well as operating as a solo instrument, it has been used as an interferometer with the Lovell Telescope, which provides a 425 m (1,394 ft) baseline. It is commonly used as part of the Multi-Element Radio Linked Interferometer Network (MERLIN), and for Very Long Baseline Interferometry observations.

== Design and construction ==
The telescope was designed by Charles Husband at the instigation of Bernard Lovell, with design work starting around September 1960. Funding for the construction of the telescope was requested on the 19 December 1960, and the telescope was operational by the summer of 1964.

The telescope was originally intended as a prototype for a larger, "Mark IV" telescope, which was never constructed. As a result, an elliptical dish was used, with a major axis of 125 ft (38.1 m) and a minor axis of 83 ft 4 in (25.4 m). The focal length is 40 ft (12.2 m). Although an elliptical dish is not the optimal surface shape for astronomical observations, it would have been necessary on a much larger telescope to reduce the telescope's height above the ground.

The base of the telescope is made of prestressed concrete. The telescope has an alt-azimuth mount sitting on 54 steel rollers in a 42 ft (12.8 m) diameter roller track on top of a foundation block. It was the first telescope in the world to be steered by a digital computer. This computer, the Ferranti Argus 104, had 12 kilobytes of memory; it was upgraded to an Argus 400 in 1971, with the 104 being put to use controlling the upgraded Lovell Telescope.

A proposal to upgrade the Mark II to a Mark IIA was put forward in 1974. The upgrade would have been to a 100 ft circular aperture which could have been used on wavelengths down to 6mm, which would have enabled it to be used as part of the high-frequency component of the original MERLIN array. It was also planned that the telescope would be used for spectral line work at millimeter wavelengths. However, the upgrade was never approved.

The original surface had an accuracy of ±1/8 inch, which meant that the telescope could observe at higher frequencies than the Lovell Telescope. The surface was upgraded in 1987 to one with an accuracy of 1/3 mm, which was accurately set using a holographic technique, meaning that the telescope can observe at the 22 GHz MERLIN frequency. The new surface is circular and was laid on top of the old, such that the telescope now has ear-like extensions where the old surface still shows.

In the late 1990s, a new, more compact carousel for the receivers was installed at the prime focus of the telescope.

== Scientific use ==
During the 1970s, the telescope was used in conjunction with the Mark III to develop phase stable long baseline interferometers, leading to the development of MERLIN. The telescope was used as an interferometer with the Lovell Telescope to provide more accurate positions for radio sources found from a survey done in 1972 and 1973; the position of one radio source was found to coincide with a pair of faint blue stars, and after optical observations were made it was found to be the first gravitational lens. The majority of the current observational time of the Mark II is spent either on MERLIN or VLBI observations.

== Appraisal ==
On 10 July 2017 the telescope was designated as a Grade I listed building. Grade I is the highest of the three grades of listing, and is applied to buildings that are of "exceptional interest".
