= MERLIN =

Radio observatory with sites across England

e-MERLIN
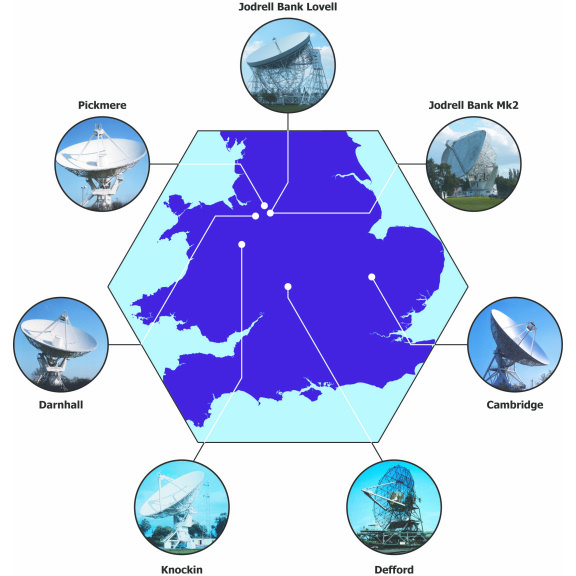
- A map showing the locations of the antennas used in MERLIN
- Alternative names: MERLIN
- Organization: Jodrell Bank Observatory; University of Manchester
- Location: England
- Website: www.e-merlin.ac.uk
- Telescopes: Cambridge MERLIN telescope; Defford telescope; Knockin telescope; Pickmere telescope; Lovell Telescope; Mark II
- Related media on Commons

The Multi-Element Radio Linked Interferometer Network (MERLIN) is an interferometer array of radio telescopes spread across England. The array is run from Jodrell Bank Observatory in Cheshire by the University of Manchester on behalf of UK Research and Innovation.

The array consists of up to seven radio telescopes located in Jodrell Bank (Lovell Telescope and Mark II), Darnhall and Pickmere (previously known as Tabley) in Cheshire, Knockin in Shropshire, Defford in Worcestershire, and Cambridge. The longest baseline is therefore 217 km and MERLIN can operate at frequencies between 151 MHz and 24 GHz. At a wavelength of 6 cm (5 GHz frequency), MERLIN has a resolution of 40 milliarcseconds which is comparable to that of the HST at optical wavelengths.

Some of the telescopes are occasionally used for European VLBI Network (EVN) and Very Long Baseline Interferometry (VLBI) observations in order to create an interferometer with even larger baselines, providing images with much greater angular resolution.

== MTLRI ==
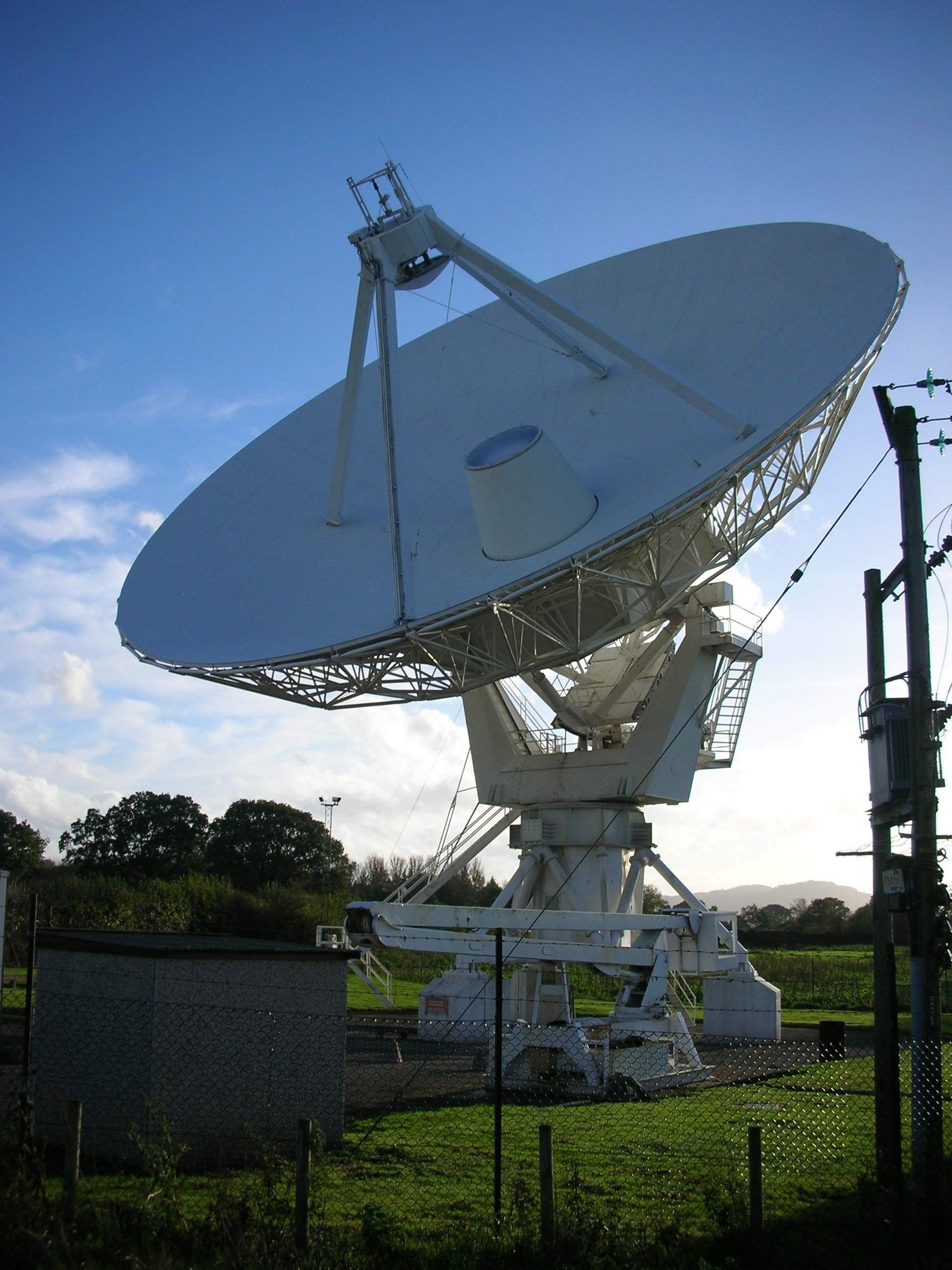
The radio telescope at Knockin

In 1973, Henry Proctor Palmer made the suggestion of extending the interferometer links already in place at Jodrell Bank at the time, which started the planning of the telescope array. Construction started in 1975. The system was originally officially called the MTRLI (Multi-Telescope Radio Linked Interferometer), but was commonly referred to by the simpler name of MERLIN. It originally consisted of either the 76m Lovell Telescope or the 25m Mark II, along with the 25m Mark III at Wardle, the 85 ft at Defford and a new telescope at Knockin. This new telescope was made by E-Systems and was constructed based on the design for the telescopes in the Very Large Array, which was being constructed at the same time also by E-Systems.

The construction of the new telescope, the installation of microwave communication links and the construction of the correlator were jointly called "Phase 1" of the MERLIN project, the funding for which was approved on 30 May 1975. The construction of the new telescope started on 9 July 1976, and was completed by 8 October 1976. The telescope was first controlled remotely from Jodrell in January 1977. The microwave links were installed in May 1978. The first observations using the system – measurements of 30 distant radio sources – were taken in January and February 1980. The final cost of phase 1 of the system was £2,179,000 (1976).

Two additional telescopes were added in Phase 2 of the project, along with their radio links to Jodrell Bank. While it was originally proposed that one of the telescopes would be sited at Jodrell Bank and the other at Darnhall, the pair were finally sited at Pickmere (also known as Tabley) and Darnhall. The two telescopes were the same as that at Knockin. Construction on both telescopes started on 9 April 1979, and was completed by 31 October 1979. The Pickmere telescope was connected into MTRLI for the first time on 20 July 1980, followed by the Darnhall telescope on 16 December 1980. The second phase was formally completed on the 31 December 1981, and had cost £3,142,210.

The longest baseline of MTRLI was 134 km, between Pickmere and Defford. The first map produced by the array was published on 6 November 1980. In the first 2 years of operation (1980–1982), the array was used to observe at frequencies of 408 MHz (with a resolving power of 1 arcsecond), 1666 MHz (0.25 arcsecond) and 5 GHz (0.08 arcsecond).

When the Mark II's surface was replaced in 1987, it could be used along with the three E-systems telescopes on the 22 GHz frequency, expanding MTRLI at that frequency. One of the 18 m dishes of the One-Mile Telescope was temporarily used in MTRLI from 1987 until autumn 1990, which greatly improved its resolution.

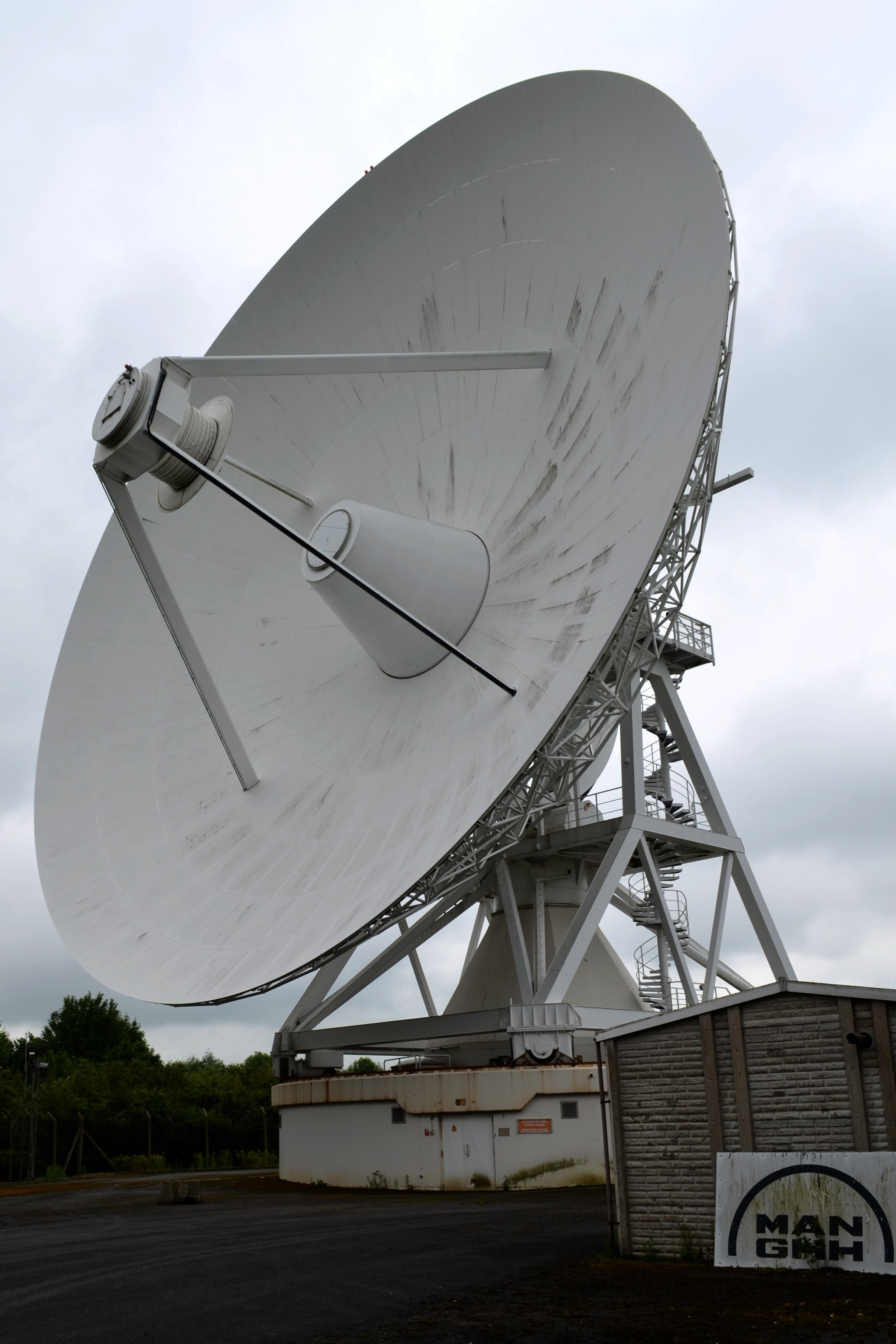
The Cambridge antenna in June 2014

MTRLI was renamed to MERLIN in the early 1990s, and shortly afterwards the addition of the purpose-built 32 m Cambridge antenna in 1991 increased both the sensitivity and angular resolution of the array. The array also had a new correlator and new, cooled receivers, and some of the microwave links between the telescopes were improved so that the array could observe both hands of polarization.

Since 1996, carousels for the different receivers on each of the E-systems telescopes and the Mark II telescope were installed (the Cambridge telescope already had such a system installed), providing frequency agility. In 1997 and 1998, dual-frequency (5 and 22 GHz) observations were made with the array for the first time.

There are plans to construct a telescope in Ireland that would be added to the array.

Original MTRLI telescopes
Name	Coordinates (links to map & photo sources)
Lovell Telescope	53°14′10.50″N 02°18′25.74″W
Mark II	53°13′51.62″N 02°18′34.16″W
Mark III	53°06′09.16″N 02°31′15.63″W
Defford	52°05′27.61″N 02°08′09.62″W
Knockin	52°47′23.9″N 02°59′44.9″W
Pickmere	53°17′18.4″N 02°26′38.4″W
Darnhall	53°09′21.6″N 02°32′03.3″W

Current MERLIN telescopes
Name	Coordinates (links to map & photo sources)
Lovell Telescope	53°14′10.50″N 02°18′25.74″W
Mark II	53°13′51.62″N 02°18′34.16″W
Defford	52°05′27.61″N 02°08′09.62″W
Knockin	52°47′23.9″N 02°59′44.9″W
Pickmere	53°17′18.4″N 02°26′38.4″W
Darnhall	53°09′21.6″N 02°32′03.3″W
Cambridge (MRAO)	52°10′1.2″N 0°2′13.4″E
Goonhilly	50°02′53″N 05°10′55″W

== e-MERLIN ==
MERLIN used microwave links to send astronomical data back from the remote stations. These links had a limited bandwidth so much of the data was thrown away. In order to increase the sensitivity of the telescope the links were replaced by optical fibre links with a bandwidth of 4 GHz, compared to the original limit of 30 MHz, increasing the sensitivity of the array by a factor of around 30. This vast increase in data meant that the old correlator was no longer able to cope, so a new correlator was constructed which is capable of processing over 200 Gbit/s.

Another major development which is part of the upgrade is frequency flexibility — the ability to alter the observing band of the entire array in a matter of minutes using rotating carousels of receivers. Some telescopes in the array already had this capability, while the rest required the visit of an engineer to change the receiver. When e-MERLIN becomes operational the telescope will be able to switch rapidly between 1.4, 5, 6 and 22 GHz. This is required in order to take advantage of optimum conditions for high frequency observations where atmospheric conditions can severely affect results.

Work started on the e-MERLIN upgrade in May 2004 and it was completed in 2009.

=== STFC's Programmatic Review 2007–08 ===
On 6 March 2008 the Science and Technology Facilities Council (STFC) announced that the (e-MERLIN/JIVE) project was at risk because of a £80m shortfall in its budget. This was due to the initial recommendations of the Particle Physics, Astronomy and Nuclear Physics Science Committee (PPAN), that had listed the project as a "lower priority". Following concerns that PPAN's recommendations did not adequately represent the UK's astronomical priorities, STFC established a wider consultation review involving various advisory panels to re-priorities the STFC program. The Ground-Based Astronomy Consultation Panel then recommended e-MERLIN should be changed from the lowest band ("lower priority"), to the second highest, adding that "e-Merlin could be a world-leading facility well into the next decade" and "e-Merlin offered dramatic potential to both traditional UK radio astronomy users and importantly to a broader community".

On 8 July 2008 STFC presented their final version of the programmatic review at a Town Meeting at the Royal Society stating: "Given the strategic importance of e-MERLIN to the future of UK radio astronomy and to the highly ranked SKA project, we are working with the University of Manchester and other stakeholders to find a viable way in which e-MERLIN operations can be supported in the medium term on a shared cost basis. We have made provision for STFC support of operations to be made available to facilitate such a solution."

== Scientific results ==
Among many other things, MERLIN has been used to observe:

- Radio-loud galaxies, for example Messier 87.
- Quasars, for example 3C 418.
- Spectral line observations of Hydroxyl (OH) in interstellar gas clouds.

The telescope can also be used for highly precise astrometry. In 1998, MERLIN in conjunction with the Hubble Space Telescope discovered the first Einstein ring. The telescope has also been used in combination with the VLA to carry out a weak lensing analysis.
