= Swettenham (disambiguation) =

Swettenham is a village and civil parish in Cheshire, England.

Swettenham may also refer to:

- Frank Swettenham, the first Resident General of the Federated Malay States
- J. A. Swettenham, government official
- Port Swettenham, the former name of Port Klang, Malaysia
- Swettenham Hall, a country house near village of Swettenham, England
- Swettenham Meadows Nature Reserve
