= Asif Aziz =

English entrepreneur

- Born: Asif Haroon Aziz; January 1967 (age 59); Blantyre, Malawi
- Education: British American College London
- Occupation: Businessman
- Employer: Criterion Capital
- Title: CEO
- Children: 4

Asif Haroon Aziz (born January 1967) is a billionaire businessman and landlord. As the founder and chief executive of Criterion Capital, he is known for owning and operating buildings including the London Trocadero and Criterion Building in Piccadilly Circus.

He has faced criticism for forcing the closure of cultural institutions and has been involved as a defendant in multiple High Court cases. In 2024, Aziz changed his tax residency from London to Abu Dhabi in response to taxation reforms in the UK.

== Early life ==
Born in Limbe, Malawi in 1967, Aziz moved to Wimbledon, London at the age of ten after his family was deported by dictator Hastings Banda. He attended Terra Nova boarding school in Cheshire, then Emanuel School in Wandsworth. He later graduated from the British American College London with a business baccalaureate.

== Career ==
Working on behalf of his father's business, Aziz attended a property auction aged 16 with a relative. He lied about his age, claiming to be 18, and successfully bid £1.9 million for a building opposite South Kensington tube station. The auctioneer later recalled him as a "tiny, fresh-faced guy."

In 1986, he began investing on his own account, using a £50,000 inheritance to buy two shops in Deptford. He converted the upper floors to flats before selling the properties a year later for £100,000. His portfolio grew to £4 million, but by 1990 a series of poor investments wiped out his holdings. He subsequently worked for property developer Elliott Bernerd at Morgan Grenfell Laurie.

In 1993, Aziz traveled to Angola to recover debts on behalf of his family, who had traded in the country for over 30 years. He was unsuccessful, but instead founded a food and consumer goods distribution firm called Golfrate. The company secured exclusive wholesale rights for products from Western brands that had withdrawn from the country due to the civil war, including Nestlé, Kraft, and Unilever. By 2005, the business operated 34 cash and carry locations, with an annual turnover of over £100 million.

Golfrate was sold to Lebanese businessmen Hassan Tajideen, Kassim Tajideen and Nasser Eid in 2005. Two years later, they sued Aziz, alleging he had falsified accounts to inflate the company's value by $20 million and misled them about its profitability. The buyers cited an email in which he purportedly asked an accountant to "bullshit the numbers", and claimed he had spent company money on luxury clothes, hotels and a cruise. Aziz denied the allegations and claimed the buyers were trying to embarrass him into a settlement, offering instead an independent audit or to donate £5 million to charity. The case was settled in 2009 with the buyers paying Aziz's legal costs.

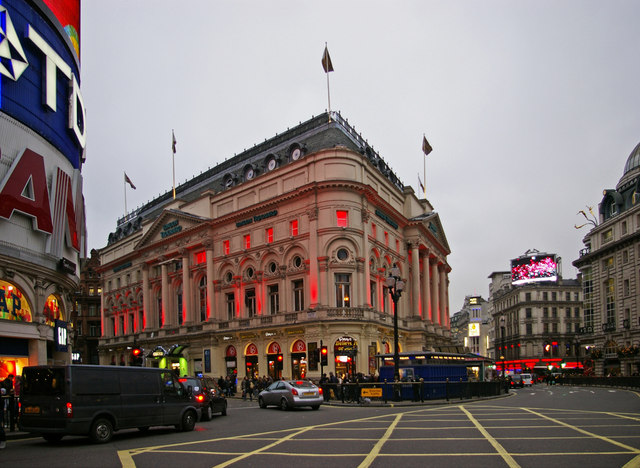
The London Trocadero, bought by Asif Aziz in 2005

In 2005, he returned to the UK and established Criterion Capital, which acquired the London Trocadero leisure complex, the London Pavilion (1 Piccadilly Circus) and The Criterion Building (1 Jermyn Street). As of 2025, the company holds a property portfolio worth £6 billion across London and the South East of England, including 15 commercial buildings in the West End of London, the Docklands and Croydon. Under Criterion's ownership, the Trocadero was converted into a hotel with 812 windowless rooms. The company has donated to both Labour and the Conservatives.

In 2006, The Daily Telegraph ranked Aziz as number 12 out of 40 in a list of successful young entrepreneurs.

== Controversies ==
Aziz has been criticised by Private Eye for using companies registered in the Isle of Man to buy properties in London, especially pubs, and then close them down to replace them with more lucrative housing developments.

In 2020, The Times asked if Aziz was "the meanest landlord in Britain", due to the way he had treated tenants during the COVID-19 pandemic.

In 2022 he was criticised by Novara Media for continuing to buy community spaces like bars and nurseries and redeveloping them into luxury apartments. Aziz's lawyers demanded the removal of the article, claiming defamation unless it was taken down. In 2025, a Londoner investigation revealed that companies linked to Aziz have bought and shuttered at least 29 London pubs, often leaving them empty or converting them into commercial developments.

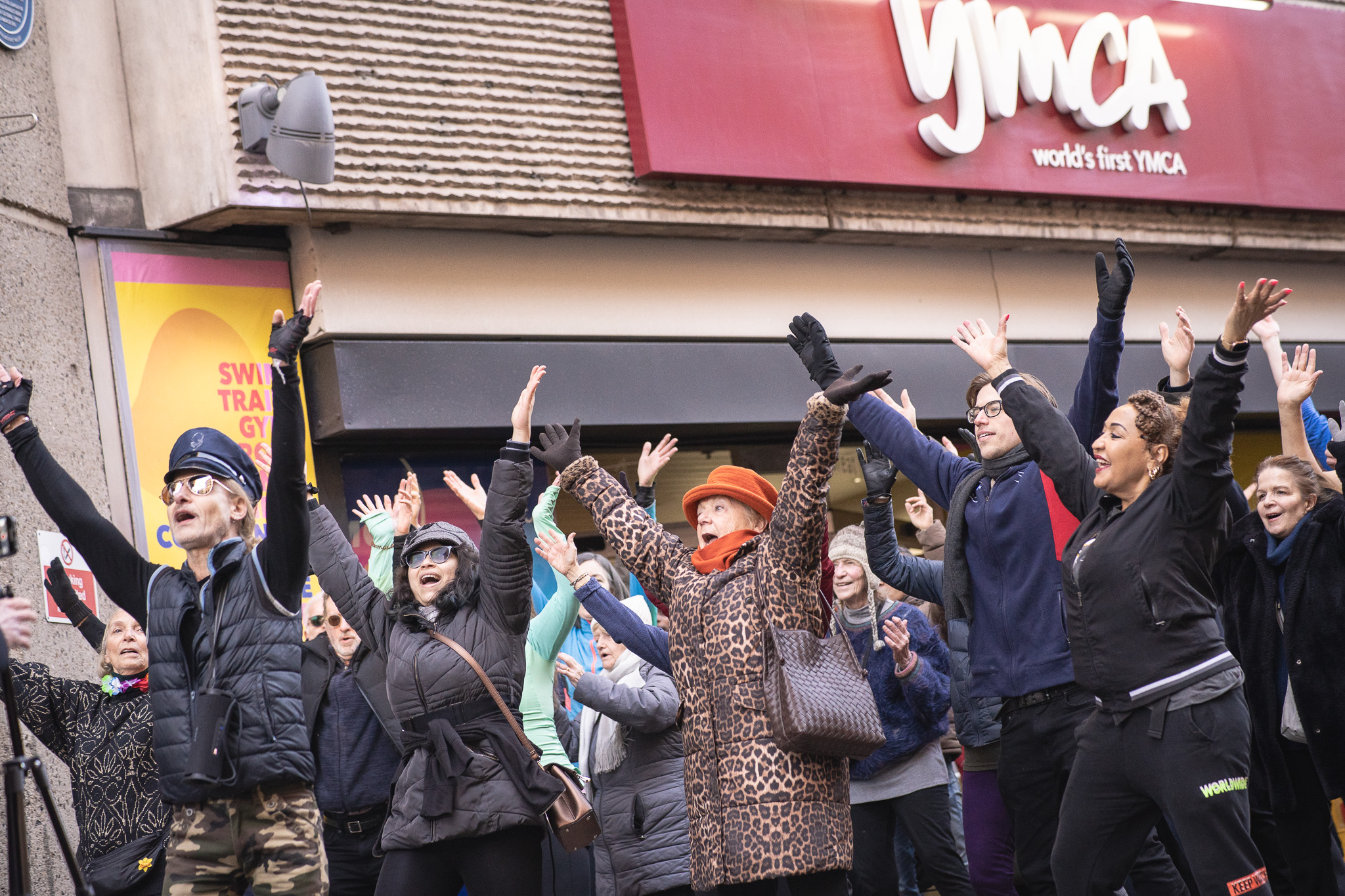
A protest against the redevelopment of the Central YMCA building

In late 2024, Aziz's property company, Criterion Capital, became associated with the planned closure of the world's first YMCA, on London's Great Russell Street. The decision to close the historic facility, which had served as a vital community hub since 1844, sparked significant public outcry and a grassroots "Save YMCA Club" campaign. Campaigners criticised Criterion Capital for prioritising redevelopment over preserving the site's community purpose and urged collaboration to explore sustainable alternatives.

The company again came under discussion in early 2025 after the Prince Charles Cinema stated that their landlord, owned by Criterion Capital, were demanding both a significant raise in rent and a 6-month break clause in the new lease. The cinema collected over 160,000 signatures on a petition to "Save The Prince Charles Cinema", and was subsequently designated an asset of community value by Westminster City Council.

In 2025, reports emerged highlighting widespread maintenance issues and vermin infestations in properties managed under Aziz's "Dstrkt" housing brand, despite rapidly rising rents. Aziz also reportedly paid £150,000 to settle allegations that he had illegally operated an unlicensed Forrest Gump-themed shrimp restaurant at Piccadilly Circus. The same site drew further scrutiny when it later reopened as a reportedly tax-avoiding, unofficial Harry Potter-themed shop.

Journalist Jim Waterson has criticised Aziz for leasing units to souvenir shops he says engage in phoenixing to evade payment of business rates and VAT. Criterion Capital responded that tenants were responsible for their own taxes but said it would assist HMRC if requested.

On 9 July 2026, a historic building on Edinburgh's Princes Street owned by Criterion Capital was badly damaged in a "significant" fire. The cause of the fire is not yet known but an investigation is underway.

== Aziz Foundation ==
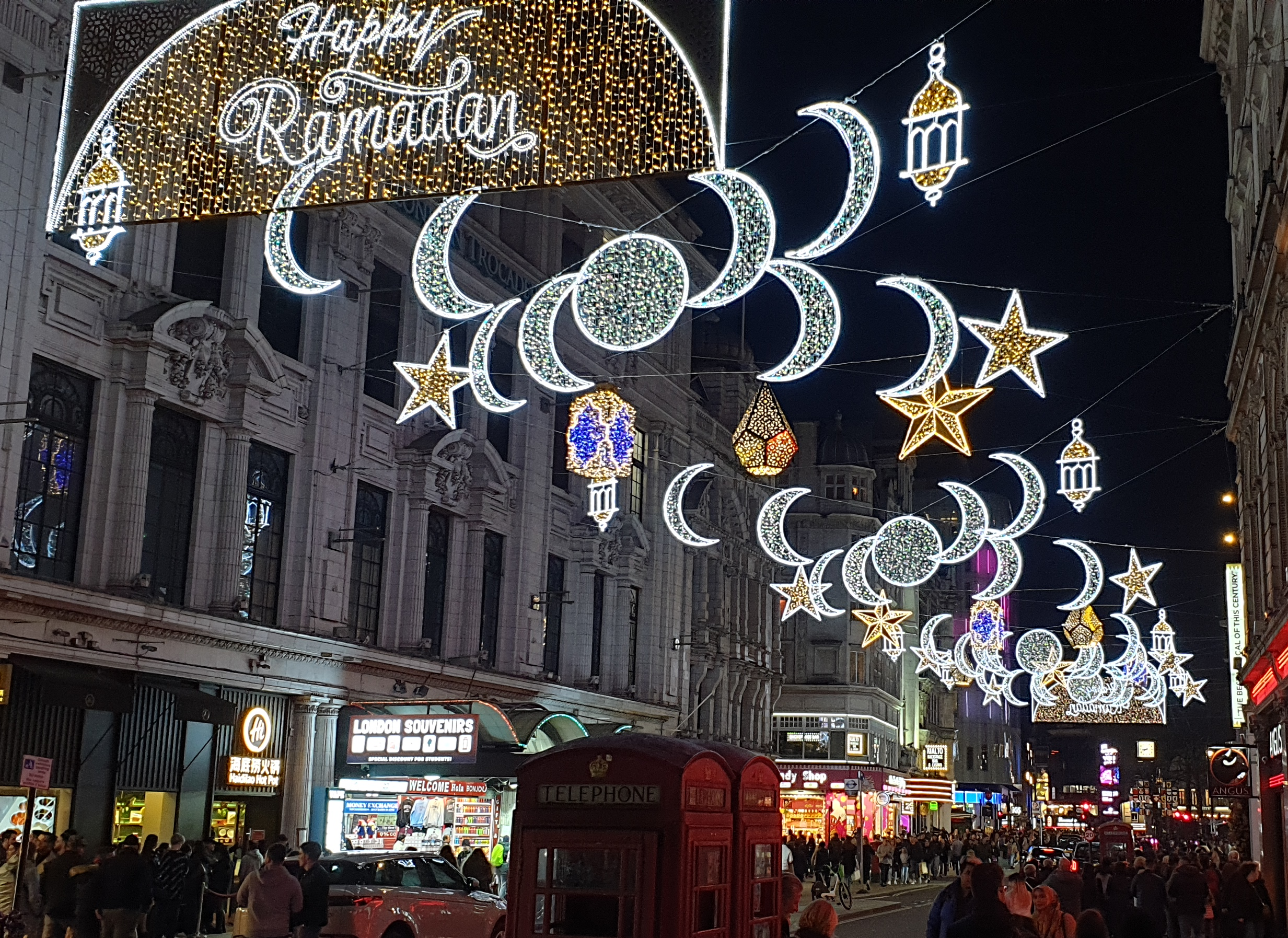
Ramadan Lights in London's West End, sponsored by the Aziz Foundation

In 2015, Aziz established the Aziz Foundation as a charitable incorporated organisation offering postgraduate scholarships, internships and grants to British Muslims. In 2022, Aziz was awarded an honorary fellowship from Goldsmiths University, where the organisation has funded students. As of 2023, he said over 500 scholarships had been funded.

The Aziz Foundation has sponsored events during Ramadan, including an illuminated display at Piccadilly Circus and an Open Iftar at Trafalgar Square, both attended by Mayor of London Sadiq Khan. It has also donated to several MPs to fund staff placements for British Muslims in their offices.

Aziz was awarded the Tun Dr Mahathir Bin Mohamad Leadership Award at the 2022 Islam Channel Business Awards.

== Personal life ==
Aziz has four children, most of whom hold senior roles in his operations: one son is a director at Criterion Capital, one daughter runs Zedwell Hotels, and another daughter is a trustee of the Aziz Foundation.

Aziz's first marriage was to a Malawi-born woman in the 1980s, but the couple divorced after two years. In a 2017 divorce case, he denied ever being married to his subsequent partner of 20 years, arguing she was not entitled to a share of what she estimated as his £1.1 billion fortune because they had never legally married under English law. Tagilde Aziz, a Portuguese woman he had met in Angola and mother of his four children, argued that a 1997 Islamic ceremony (nikah) in Wimbledon and a 2002 ceremony in Malawi constituted valid marriages. The case, described as one of the largest divorce proceedings ever in the UK, was ultimately settled out of court.

Aziz is a Muslim and has suggested negative media coverage of his activities stems from Islamophobia, stating that he is targeted because he is a "champion of British Muslim issues". In a 2023 editorial in The Times, he described "being shut out of the property market because of the colour of my skin and dim view of my faith".
