= Twemlow Hall =

Country house in Twemlow, Cheshire, England

Coordinates: 53.21227°N 2.32842°W

Twemlow Hall is a 17th-century country house standing on the site of a former moated manor house in the ancient parish of St Luke's, Goostrey, and the civil parish of Twemlow, Cheshire, England.

== History ==
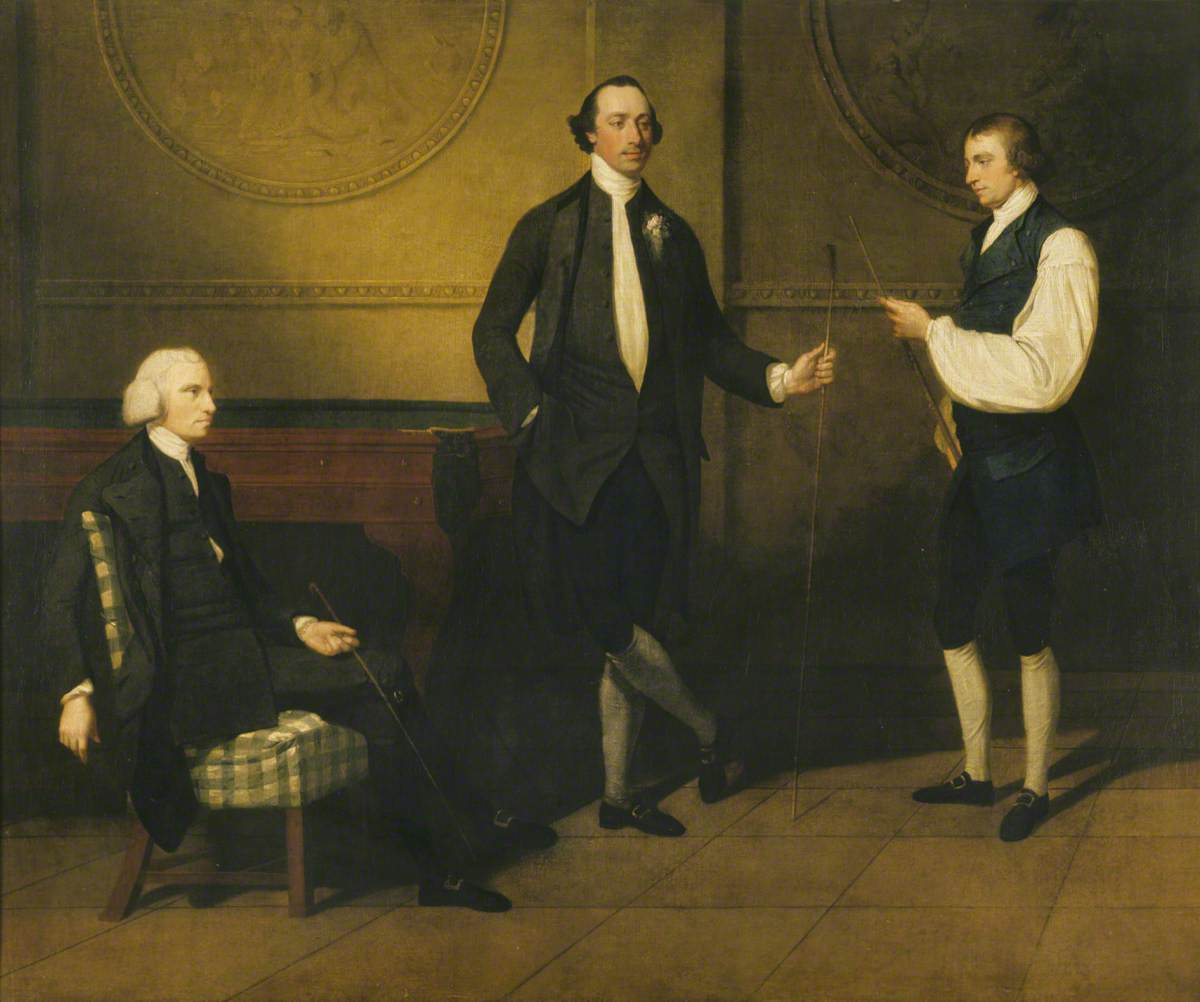
Charles Everard Booth (seated) with Walter Griffith Booth and Thomas Bache playing billiards at Twemlow Hall, painted by John Hamilton Mortimer c. 1770

Twemlow Hall was owned by the Booth family, cadets of the Booths of Dunham Massey, from the 16th until 19th century.

The third son of Sir William Booth (died 1519), High Sheriff of Cheshire, was Edward Booth who was demised a moiety title of the manor of Twemlow as a dowry by his second marriage in 1523 to Mary Knutsford, elder daughter and co-heiress of Roger Knutsford (died 1537) of Nether Knutsford, whose great-grandfather John Knutsford (died 1459), inherited from his mother, Katherine de Twemlow.

Twemlow Hall was originally timber-framed and built in the Tudor architectural style for William Booth (1526–1591). William's grandson, John Booth (1584–1659), better known as the Cheshire Genealogist and who died unmarried, began rebuilding Twemlow Hall with his younger brother, Lawrence Booth (1599–1662). The work was completed in the late 17th century by his son John Booth (1641–1698). John Booth's grandson, Thomas Booth (1695–1786), was High Sheriff of Cheshire for 1737/38, and was last of the male line seated at Twemlow. The hall passed to his elder sister's son, Charles Everard Booth (1726–1792), who bequeathed the estate to his nephew, Walter Griffith Booth (1750–1810), a captain in the Royal Navy.

William Bache Booth (1793–1830) inherited Twemlow Hall in 1810 and "much altered" the house in 1817 after marrying Mary Ann Fox. Their surviving son, Walter Booth (1822–1880), of Frimley Park in Surrey, sold the Booth moiety of the manor of Twemlow and estate in 1862 to Egerton Leigh, author of Ballads and Legends of Cheshire (1867) and of A Glossary of Words Used in the Dialect of Cheshire (1877). A major county landowner, Leigh was principally seated at nearby Jodrell Hall and Broadwell Manor in Gloucestershire, also owning the Cheshire estates of West Hall in High Legh and Kermincham House, and Bulcote Lodge in Nottinghamshire. His son, Captain Egerton Leigh (1843–1928), who married Lady Elizabeth White (1847–1880) sister of Lady Ardilaun, sold the estate in 1924 to Edwin Stockton.

Twemlow Hall was renovated again in 1974.

== Architecture ==
Booth arms

Twemlow Hall is constructed of red brick on a stone plinth with flush stone quoins and a slate roof. It has two storeys with a symmetrical façade of five bays, three of which are gabled, and recessed sash windows. Its ovolo-moulded doorway is surmounted by stone tablet with the Booth family coat of arms.

Recorded in the National Heritage List for England as a designated grade II-listed building, three outbuildings on each side of the former stable yard are also listed Grade II.

== See also ==
- Listed buildings in Twemlow
