= St Peter's Church, Swettenham =

Coordinates: 53.2013°N 2.2996°W

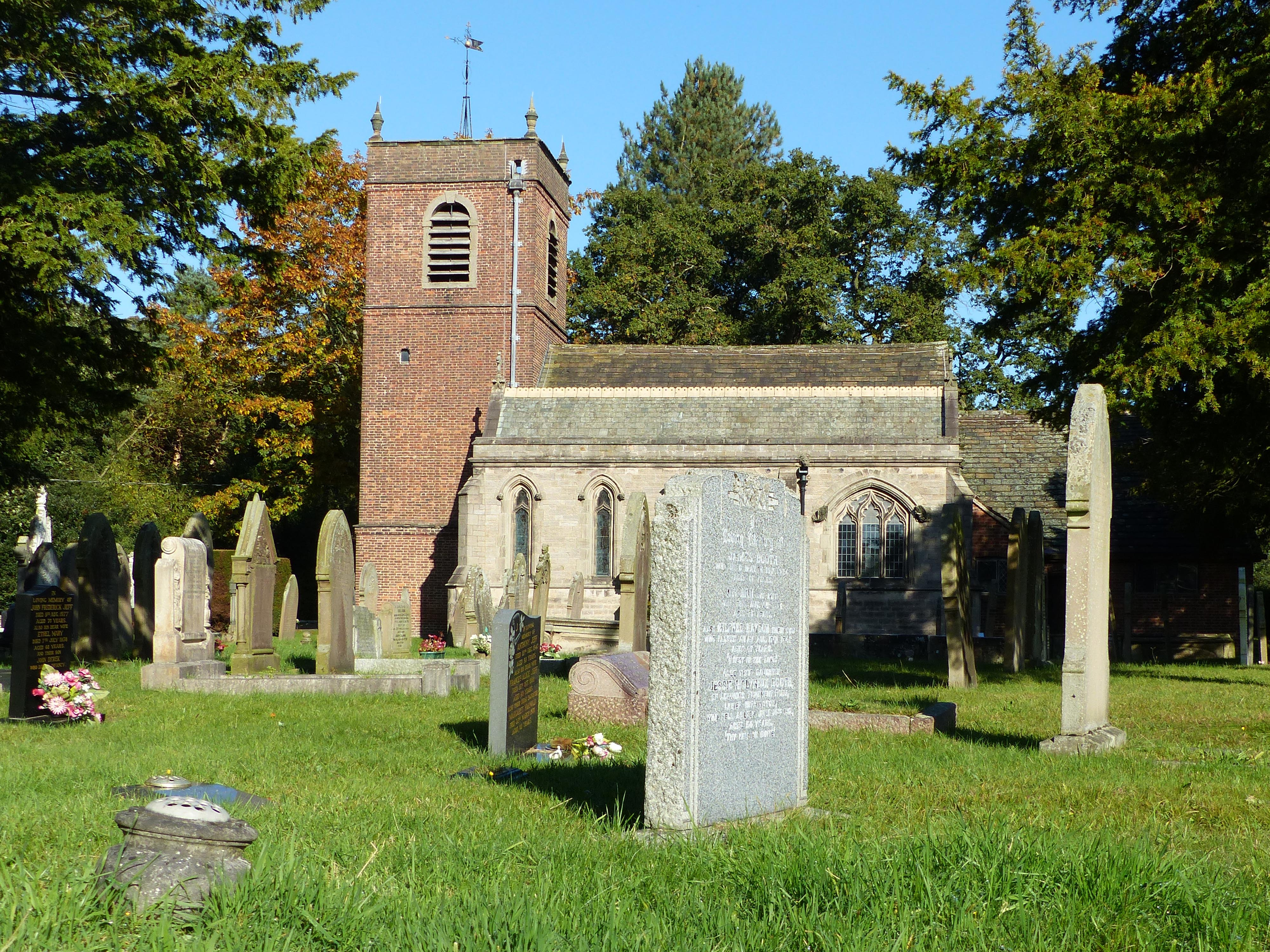
- St Peter's Church, Swettenham, from the south

- Location in Cheshire
- OS grid reference: SJ 801 672
- Location: Swettenham, Cheshire
- Country: England
- Denomination: Anglican
- Website: Swettenham, St Peter

History
- Status: Parish church

Architecture
- Functional status: Active
- Heritage designation: Grade II*
- Designated: 14 February 1967
- Architect(s): J. M. Derrick (1846 restoration)
- Architectural type: Church
- Style: Romanesque Revival; Gothic Revival
- Completed: 1926

Specifications
- Materials: Brick and stone Slate roofs

Administration
- Province: York
- Diocese: Chester
- Archdeaconry: Macclesfield
- Deanery: Congleto n
- Parish: Swettenham

Clergy
- Vicar: Revd Jim Cartlidge

St Peter's Church is in the village of Swettenham, Cheshire, England. The church is recorded in the National Heritage List for England as a designated Grade II* listed building. It is an active Anglican parish church in the diocese of Chester, the archdeaconry of Macclesfield and the deanery of Congleton. Its benefice is combined with that of Marton, Siddington, Eaton and Hulme Walfield.

== History ==
It is considered that a Norman church followed by a timber-framed church (of which some timbers remain in the sanctuary) was on the site of the present church. The nave is thought to have been added in around 1500. The building was encased in brick in the early 1720s and most of the timber framework was lost partly at this time and partly during later restorations. In 1846 a restoration was carried out by J. M. Derrick in Romanesque style and a Victorian restoration in 1865 was in Gothic Revival style. Another restoration took place in 1926.

== Architecture ==
=== Exterior ===
The plan of the church consists of a west tower, a four-bay nave with north and south aisles, a two-bay chancel and a north porch. The tower is built in brick, as is the wall of the north aisle, while the wall of the south aisle is stone. The roofs are of slate. On the west face of the tower is a door above which is a window and above that a clock in a diamond-shaped wooden frame. On the top of the tower is a brick parapet with a stone coping and vase finials on the corners, and a weather vane on a high-standing metal support. Above the north porch is a sculpture of an ass's head upon the coronet of a marquess, which is the crest of the Mainwaring family.

=== Interior ===
The pulpit is thought to date from the time of Queen Anne and was placed in the church around 1722. The altar rails are placed round three sides and in the church are three Jacobean chairs. Two fonts are present, one dating from the 18th century and the other from the Romanesque restoration. To the south of the altar is a stained glass window which contains some medieval glass. In the south aisle walls are four Gothic monuments. On the north aisle wall are painted commandment boards. A fragment of an Anglo-Saxon cross is set high in the wall between the nave and the south aisle. In the vestry, above the Bryce family memorial, is mounted an old fiddle which was played in the church until about 1811. The organ was built in 1964 by Noel Mander incorporating some of the pipework from the previous organ by Bryceson. The astronomer Bernard Lovell was organist for 40 years. There is a ring of three bells, which are dated from around 1500, from 1627 and from 1689. The parish registers begin in 1547 and the churchwardens' accounts in the 17th century.

== See also ==
- Grade II* listed buildings in Cheshire East
- Listed buildings in Swettenham
