= Clonterbrook House =

Former manor house in Cheshire, England

Coordinates: 53.20186°N 2.26868°W

Clonterbrook House is a former manor house in the parish of Swettenham, Cheshire, England. It was built in 1697 for Jeffery and Katherine Lockett. It passed from the Lockett family in 1769, but was bought by Derek and Elizabeth Lockett in 1939. They restored the house in 1949. The house is constructed in brick, and it has a stone-slate roof. There are two storeys plus an attic, and it is in five bays. It is recorded in the National Heritage List for England as a designated Grade II* listed building. Around the house are three former farm buildings that have been converted into other uses; they are all listed at Grade II. The former shippon, which was damaged in an air raid in 1941, has been rebuilt as a music room. A former bakehouse is now an office, and a barn has been developed into a picture gallery. Clonter Opera Theatre has been built adjacent to these buildings.

== See also ==
- Grade II* listed buildings in Cheshire East
- Listed buildings in Swettenham
