= Twemlow (surname) =

Twemlow is a surname. Notable people with the surname include:

- Alice Twemlow, British writer, critic, and educator
- Billy Twemlow (1892–1933), English footballer
- Charlie Twemlow (1901–1976), English footballer, brother of Billy

== See also ==
- Twemlow, the Cheshire parish
- Twombly (disambiguation), a surname derived from Twemlow
