= Twombly =

Twombly may refer to:

== People ==
- Carol Twombly, American calligrapher
- Cy Twombly (1928–2011), American abstract artist
- Darren Twombly (born 1965), American football player
- Hamilton McKown Twombly, railroad tycoon, owner of Vinland Estate
- Mary Twombly (born 1935) American composer, conductor and pianist
- Timothy Twombly, American politician
- Voltaire P. Twombly, recipient of the Medal of Honor
- Wells Twombly (1935–1977), American sportswriter and author

== Other uses ==
- Twombly Ridge, Maine, an unorganized area in the United States
- Twombly (cyclecar), an American automobile manufactured between 1913 and 1915
- Bell Atlantic Corp. v. Twombly, a United States Supreme Court case

== See also ==
- Twemlow, the Cheshire parish the name Twombly derives from
- Twemlow (surname)
