= Bryan Lovell =

British Geologist (1942-2024)

- Born: 10 February 1942; Bath, Somerset, England
- Died: 20 September 2024 (aged 82)
- Education: New College, Oxford
- Employer: BP
- Father: Bernard Lovell
- Honours: OBE

Julian Patrick Bryan Lovell OBE (10 February 1942 – 20 September 2024) was a geologist who spent much of his working life with BP. After retirement he was elected President of the Geological Society of London. He promoted the recognition of man-made climate change and was a prominent advocate for carbon capture and storage.

== Early life and education ==
Lovell was born on 10 February 1942 in Bath, England, he was the second of five children, their father was the astronomer Sir Bernard Lovell who was the first director of Jodrell Bank Observatory. He grew up in Swettenham, Cheshire, was educated at King's School, Macclesfield and went on to study geology at New College, Oxford, graduating with a BA in 1963. He then studied the sandstones of the Carboniferous Bude Formation, North Cornwall under the supervision of Harold Reading and in 1964 he was awarded an MSc by Oxford for that work. He carried out research under the supervision of Raymond Siever at Harvard University, graduating in 1968 with a PhD on the "Eocene Tyee Formation of the Oregon Coast Range".

== Scotland ==
After graduating from Harvard he spent ten years as a lecturer in the Department of Geology at the University of Edinburgh (1970-1981). Whilst at Edinburgh he worked on sandstones which had been deposited in deep-water by turbidites (like the sediments he had studied in Cornwall and Oregon) and by contourites. His work on developing criteria for distinguishing between sediments deposited by these different mechanisms attracted the attention of people involved in hydrocarbon exploration and in 1979 he set up the consultancy firm 'Petrological Services Edinburgh Ltd' to advise oil industry clients.

During his time in Scotland he became active in politics with the Scottish Liberal Party and in 1978 he became their energy spokesman. He unsuccessfully stood as the Liberal's Parliamentary candidate for Edinburgh South in the General Election of May 1979, being beaten to third place by Michael Ancram and Gordon Brown.

== Oil industry ==
Lovell joined BP as a geologist in 1981 and over the next fifteen years he was the company's Chief Sedimentologist, Exploration Manager for Ireland and later for the Middle East, and finally the overall Head of Recruitment at BP Exploration.

Whilst based in Dublin he was awarded an OBE in the Diplomatic Service and Overseas List of the 1989 Birthday Honours for 'Services to British Commercial interests and to Anglo-Irish relations'.

- 1981 Joined BP
- 1984 Became BP's first Chief Sedimentologist
- 1989 Exploration Manager for Ireland
- 1996 Retired from BP
- continued as a consultant until 2009

== Climate change and the Geological Society ==
After his retirement from BP, Lovell became a prominent advocate for carbon capture and storage and promoted the recognition of man-made climate change. He generated interest in the subject by his involvement in conferences concerning climate change and the publication of the book, ‘Challenged by Carbon: the Oil Industry and Climate Change’, published in 2010.

Lovell was elected as President of the Geological Society of London (2010-12).

=== Publications ===
'Challenged by Carbon: The Oil Industry and Climate Change', Cambridge University Press (2010)
