= Jodrell Hall =

- Terra Nova School
- Location in Cheshire
- 53.2276°N 2.3072°W
- OS grid reference: SJ 796 701

History
- Built: 1779

Site notes
- Area: Cheshire East
- Architect(s): John Douglas (1885 extension)
- Architectural style: Georgian

Listed Building – Grade II
- Designated: 6 June 1952
- Reference no.: 1231670

Jodrell Hall is a country house near Jodrell Bank in the parish of Twemlow, in the county of Cheshire, England.

Requisitioned during World War II, the building later became an educational establishment, now known as Terra Nova School. It is recorded in the National Heritage List for England as a designated Grade II listed building.

== History ==
Built in 1779 as a country house in the Georgian style, in 1885 the Chester architect John Douglas added a south wing and a porch to the mansion for the Egerton Leigh family (also of West Hall, High Legh).

Jodrell Hall became a preparatory school since 1955.

== Architecture ==
The hall is built in red brick with sandstone dressings and a slate roof. Its plan consists of a five-bay central block, and north and south three-bay wings. The central block and the north wing have three storeys; the south block has two storeys and an attic. The middle three bays of the central block project slightly forwards and are surmounted by a pediment with an oculus in its tympanum. The south wing has shaped gables over the middle bay and on the gable end.

== Owners and residents ==
The present Hall was built in 1779 by Egerton Leigh (1752-1833) and his wife Elizabeth Jodrell (1753-1807). The estate had been owned by the Jodrell family since the early 16th Century and Elizabeth had inherited the property on the death of her grandfather Francis Jodrell (1669-1757). She brought it to the Leigh family when she married Egerton Leigh in 1778. Before the Hall was built there existed another residence which was demolished by the recently married couple. This was described by a descendent of the Leigh family in 1910. He said that the old Jodrell house stood at the top end of the kitchen garden of the present Hall. He also said that some of it still remains namely portions of the stables and farm building and an old dovecote. The present Hall remained in the ownership of the Leigh family for the next two and a half centuries until 1924. This was over four generations and the owners for all four were called Egerton as was the custom in many English families at this time.

The next owner after the originators of the house was this couple's son Egerton Leigh (1779-1865). He married in 1809 Wilhelmina Sarah Stratton (1785-1849) daughter of George Stratton of Tewpark. When he died in 1865 his eldest son Lieutenant-Colonel Egerton Leigh became the owner.

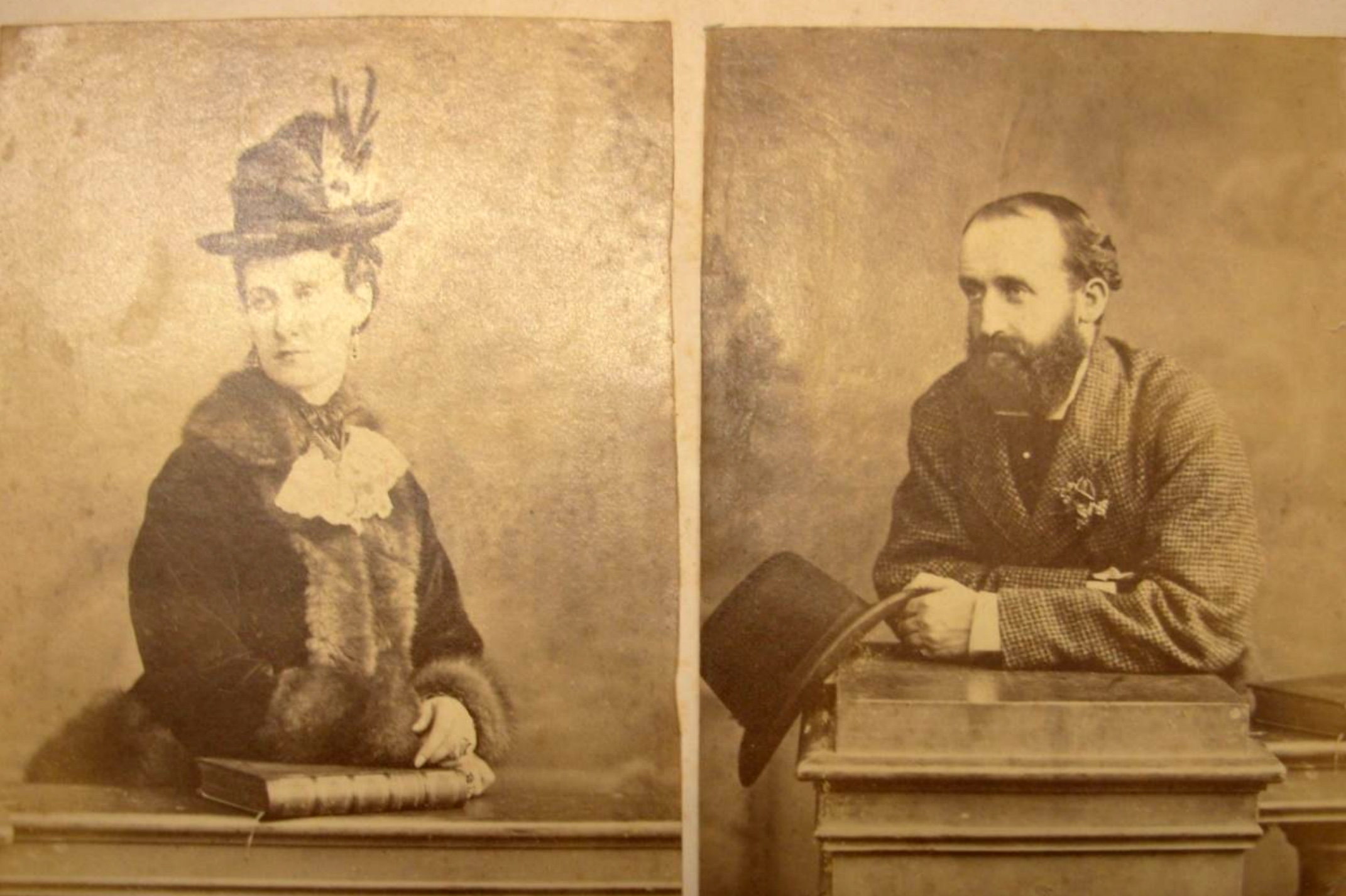
Captain Egerton Leigh (1843-1928) and his wife Lady Elizabeth Hedges-White.

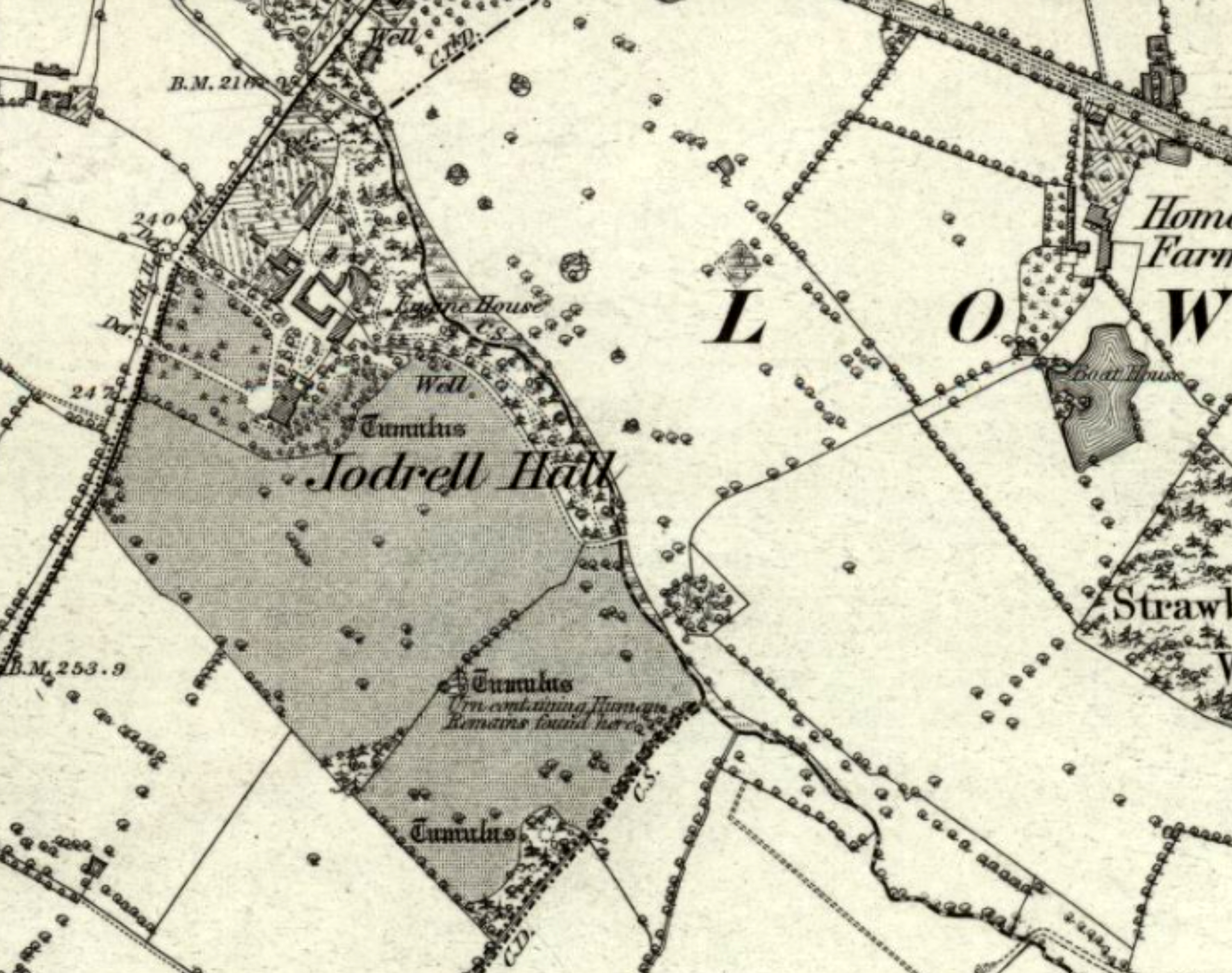
Map of Jodrell Hall in 1875

Lieutenant-Colonel Egerton Leigh (1815-1876) was a Member of Parliament. In 1842 he married Lydia Rachel Wright (1813-1892). The 1871 Census records the couple at the Hall with a butler, a footman, a page boy and nine other house servants. When he died in 1876 his eldest son Captain Egerton Leigh became the owner of the property.

Captain Egerton Leigh (1843-1928) was the last member of the Leigh family to own the Hall. In 1874 he married Lady Elizabeth Hedges White (1847-1880) eldest daughter of the Earl of Bantry and sister to Olivia Charlotte Guinness, Baroness Ardilaun, the richest woman in England. The couple had two children. Elizabeth died in 1880 and Egerton remarried in 1889. His new bride was Violet Cecil Mary Tippinge (1865-1941) and they had two more children. They sold the Hall in 1924 to Sir Edwin Stockton.

Sir Edwin Stockton (1873-1939) was a wealthy industrialist. He married twice. His first wife died in 1922 and in 1923 he married Alice Marion Cox (1877-1943) who was also a widow. Shortly after their marriage they bought Jodrell Hall. Sir Edwin was very enthusiastic about cricket and on several occasions he invited the visiting Australian cricket team including Don Bradman to stay at Jodrell Hall during their visit. He and his brother were important in running Sale in Cheshire Cricket Club as well as in other cricket clubs in Lancashire. In a short silent movie made in 1928 at a cricket match at Old Trafford he and his wife Lady Stockton can be seen from about the middle of the film. The movie can be seen at this reference. Sir Edwin died in 1939. Terra Nova School moved to the Hall soon after this.

== See also ==
- Terra Nova School
- Listed buildings in Twemlow
- List of houses and associated buildings by John Douglas
- Jodrell Bank
