= William Booth (Royal Navy officer) =

Sir William Booth
- Born: 1640
- Died: 1689 (aged 48–49)
- Father: Revd Ferdinando Booth
- Relatives: Booth baronets

Captain Sir William Booth (1640–1689), Commissioner of the Royal Navy, promoted Captain in June 1673.

== Later military career ==
After the peace with the Dutch Booth was for several years employed in the Mediterranean, and more especially against the Algerine pirates. On 8 April 1681, whilst in command of HMS Adventure, he engaged one of these corsairs named the Golden Horse, a vessel larger, more heavily armed, and with a more numerous ship's company, The fight was long and bloody; both ships were much shattered, but neither could claim the victory, when a stranger came in sight under Turkish colours. She proved, however, to be the English ship HMS Nonsuch, commanded by Captain Sir Francis Wheler, and to her the Golden Horse at once submitted without further resistance. A somewhat acrimonious dispute afterwards arose between the others and men of the two ships as to their relative share in the capture, which also involved Lieutenant John Benbow, Captain Wheler assuming all the honour to himself, and claiming the whole profit of the prize. The question was referred by Booth to the admiralty, who, without any evidence beyond Booth's partial statement, directed the commander-in-chief to "cause the colours of the Golden Horse to be delivered to Captain Booth as a mark of honour which we Judge he hath well deserved", and also an appointed share of the value of the prize. (Note: British Museum Addl. manuscript 19872, f. 67)

In 1683 Booth commanded HMS Grafton; in September 1688 he was appointed to the 70-gun HMS Pendennis; and in the following February, having given in his allegiance to King William III, he was knighted and appointed Commissioner of the Navy. It would appear that his profession of allegiance was but a blind to enable him the better to act as agent to the exiled James; for on 16 March he went down the river to the Pendennis, then lying at Sheerness, and endeavoured by his personal influence and promises of money to persuade the lieutenants to agree with him in carrying over the ship to France; the plot also involved carrying over the fireship HMS Eagle, commanded by Captain Robert Wilford, who seemed to acquiesce. But Wilford got too drunk to act the part designed for him, and the lieutenants refused to have anything to do with it, or to let the Pendennis go; on which Booth, conceiving that he had gone too far, and that the affair could not be kept secret, fled to France. No account remains of his further life or of his death. (Note: Charnock's Biography. Nav. i. 387) (Note: Minutes of Court-martial on Captain Robert Wilford. 30 July 1689, in Public Record Office.)

== See also ==
- Twemlow Hall
