= Douglas Gardner =

Douglas Gardner may refer to:

- Douglas Gardner (actor) in Our Town (1940 film)
- Douglas Gardner (figure skater), see 2000 Canadian Figure Skating Championships

== See also ==
- Sir Douglas Bruce-Gardner, 2nd Baronet (1917–1997) of the Bruce-Gardner baronets
- Gardner (surname)
