= Criterion Capital =

British property company

Criterion Capital Ltd.
- Trade name: Criterion Capital
- Company type: Private
- Industry: Real estate
- Founded: 26 July 2006; 19 years ago
- Founder: Asif Aziz (CEO)
- Headquarters: London
- Area served: Europe
- Key people: Faizan Ahmad (Director); Danish Hanif (Director)
- Website: www.criterioncapital.co.uk

Criterion Capital is a privately held British property company, which owns and manages property estate in prime areas of London, particularly in Leicester Square and Piccadilly Circus.

== History ==
The company was founded by Asif Aziz, a Malawi-born developer, who became its chief executive. The ultimate owner of the company is a trust linked to Aziz, via ACT Property Holdings Ltd, an Isle of Man company.

The company's flagship project is the London Trocadero leisure complex on Piccadilly Circus, which was acquired in 2005. Part of the building was converted into a hotel which opened in 2020: the Zedwell Piccadilly has 728 windowless rooms and a large rooftop bar. Plans were submitted in May 2020 to develop parts of the building's basement into a mosque. The plans drew controversy as the Piccadilly neighbourhood was known for its nightlife rather than places of worship.

In April 2020, the company threatened tenants with legal action for unpaid rent during the COVID-19 pandemic, despite a government moratorium on evictions. It extended rent-free periods to some tenants deemed to be "in need."

Criterion Capital is also developing projects in Croydon with the purchase of two office buildings around 2015, and has a riverside site at Enderby's Wharf, East Greenwich.

In 2022, the company invested €80 million into residential apartments in Miraflores, Portugal. This was the company's first expansion outside of the United Kingdom.

In 2025, Criterion Capital acquired and closed the world's oldest YMCA building on Great Russell Street, London, leading to public scrutiny and media attention. The YMCA building had long been regarded as a vital community hub, providing affordable facilities, fitness classes, and educational programs to residents across London. A "Save YMCA Club" campaign emerged, advocating for a six-month pause on the closure to explore sustainable solutions to preserve the historic site. Protesters, community leaders, and members of the YMCA have called on Criterion Capital to collaborate on a rescue plan to retain the site's services under a new brand or operational model. As of June 2025 there was no mention of the YMCA building or any plans on Criterion's website. The issue has sparked broader discussions about the preservation of historic community spaces in central London amidst growing commercial developments.

In early 2025, the Prince Charles Cinema stated that their landlord Zedwell LSQ Ltd, owned by Criterion Capital, was demanding both a significant raise in rent and a 6-month break clause in the new lease. A petition entitled "Save The Prince Charles Cinema" was set up by the cinema in response. The petition gathered 115,000 signatures in its first two days. Aziz said: "We've not bought Prince Charles to close it down. We have a planning application to convert the upper parts into a hotel. Having the Prince Charles Cinema there adds value and panache to our building, to our hospitality offering." He also said that the cinema had been paying "nothing", and were objecting to having to pay market rent; the cinema say that the rent claimed is not fair.

In 2025, reports emerged highlighting widespread maintenance issues and vermin infestations in properties managed under Criterion Capital's "Dstrkt" housing brand, despite rapidly rising rents. Criterion's Asif Aziz also reportedly paid £150,000 to settle allegations that he had illegally operated an unlicensed Forrest Gump-themed shrimp restaurant at Piccadilly Circus. After its closure, the site was repurposed and later drew further scrutiny when it reopened in December as a reportedly tax-avoiding, unofficial Harry Potter-themed shop.
