= William Booth (1526–1591) =

English landowner (1526–1591)

William Booth (1526–1591) was an English landowner in the Tudor era, seated at Twemlow in Cheshire.

Booth coat of arms

== Life ==
The eldest son of Edward Booth by his second wife, Mary Knutsford, elder daughter and co-heiress of Roger Knutsford (died 1537), of Nether Knutsford and Elizabeth Mainwaring, Booth succeeded to his mother's estate in 1548.

Educated at Macclesfield Grammar School, Booth married in 1548 Ellen Davenport, daughter of John Davenport of Woodford, Cheshire, having with other issue five sons. The eldest, John Booth (1554–1621) married Isabel Lowndes, whose family were seated nearby at Smallwood, Cheshire.

His second son Thomas Booth (died 1624), Constable of Chester Castle, was grandfather of Captain Sir William Booth, Commissioner of the Royal Navy (1688–89) and his cousin, George Booth (1515–1543), of Dunham Massey was grandfather of Sir George Booth, 1st Baronet (cr. 1611) and High Sheriff of Cheshire. His third son, Arthur Booth (died 1592) served briefly in Ulster under the Earl of Ormond and Ossory before being injured and returning to Cheshire where his descendants were later seated at Foxley Hall, Lymm. The Booth baronets of Allerton Beeches (cr. 1916) descend via a cadet branch of his family which in the 18th century settled at Orford, Lancashire and then Liverpool, where they became shipowners.

After the accession of Elizabeth I, Booth renovated the medieval timber-framed manor house, establishing Twemlow Hall as the family seat for the next 300 years.

== See also ==
- Booth baronets
- High Sheriff of Cheshire
- Twemlow Hall
