= Francis Wheler =

Royal Navy officer (1656–1694)

Rear-Admiral Sir Francis Wheler
- Born: 1656
- Died: February 19, 1694 (aged 37–38); HMS Sussex, off Gibraltar
- Military career
- Allegiance: England
- Branch: Royal Navy
- Rank: Rear-Admiral of the Red
- Commands: HMS Nonsuch; HMS Kingfisher; HMS Tyger; HMS Centurion; HMS Kent; HMS Albemarle; Jamaica Station
- Conflicts: Nine Years' War: Battle of Beachy Head; Battle of Barfleur
- Awards: Knight Bachelor

Rear-Admiral of the Red Sir Francis Wheler (1656 – 19 February 1694) was a Royal Navy officer who served in the Nine Years' War. Wheler spent the early part of his career in the Mediterranean, eventually being promoted to command his own ships, and being particularly active against the Barbary corsairs and Salé Rovers. He went on to serve in British waters, and was knighted by King James II. Wheler remained in the navy after the Glorious Revolution and his continued good service led to the command of a squadron.

He fought at Beachy Head and Barfleur, and in 1692 was promoted to flag rank. Wheler took a fleet out to attack French possessions in the Caribbean and North America, but his attack on Martinique ended in failure when large numbers of the troops involved became sick. He floated the idea of an attack on Quebec, but insufficient troops could be found, and an assault on Newfoundland was similarly considered but rejected after the defences were found to be too great to overcome.

Wheler nevertheless received another promotion, and went out to the Mediterranean in command of a large convoy. He made little attempt to engage the French warships he encountered on the voyage, but concentrated on reaching Cádiz safely. After successfully escorting the convoy Wheler attempted to navigate the strait of Gibraltar, but encountered fierce winds. His fleet was scattered and a number of ships were wrecked, while his flagship, HMS Sussex, foundered with heavy loss of life early in the morning of 19 February 1694. Wheler was among the dead, his body being washed up two days later.

== Early life ==
Francis Wheler was born in 1656, a younger son of Sir Charles Wheler and his wife Dorothy, daughter of Sir Francis Bindlosse. He entered the navy and on 30 April 1678 was appointed second-lieutenant aboard HMS Rupert by Vice-Admiral Sir Arthur Herbert, while serving in the Mediterranean. Wheler continued in Rupert under Sir John Narborough, who promoted him to first-lieutenant on 5 May 1679, and on 6 April 1680 moved aboard HMS Bristol at the same rank, serving under Herbert again. Herbert appointed Wheler to post-captain on 11 September 1680 and gave him command of HMS Nonsuch. On 8 April 1681 he came across a British ship, HMS Adventure under Captain William Booth, fighting an Algerine pirate ship named Golden Horse. The Golden Horse had been on the point of surrendering, but mistaking Wheler's ship for one of his allies, fought on until Nonsuch came up and hoisted her colours, at which the pirate vessel surrendered. Serving as Nonsuch's master at the time was John Benbow, who was later court-martialed for his comments regarding Adventure's fighting ability.

Wheler took command of HMS Kingfisher on 9 August 1681 and in October fought an action against a large Salé Rover ship, Admiral of Salé. The ship put up a spirited defence, and sustained so much damage that she sank shortly after surrendering to Wheler. Wheler's next command was HMS Tyger, which he was appointed to on 25 August 1683. He commanded her until August 1688, when he was moved to HMS Centurion by King James II, and moved again on 16 November by the King to HMS Kent. It was about this time that Wheler received a knighthood from the King. Wheler remained in the navy after the Glorious Revolution, and in April 1689 was sent to join his old patron Sir Arthur Herbert, by now Earl of Torrington. Torrington had however been engaged at the indecisive Battle of Bantry Bay, and returned to port before Wheler could join him. Wheler's voyage was not entirely unsuccessful, for he had captured a large and valuable merchant ship bound for Brest from St Domingo.

== Command and flag rank ==
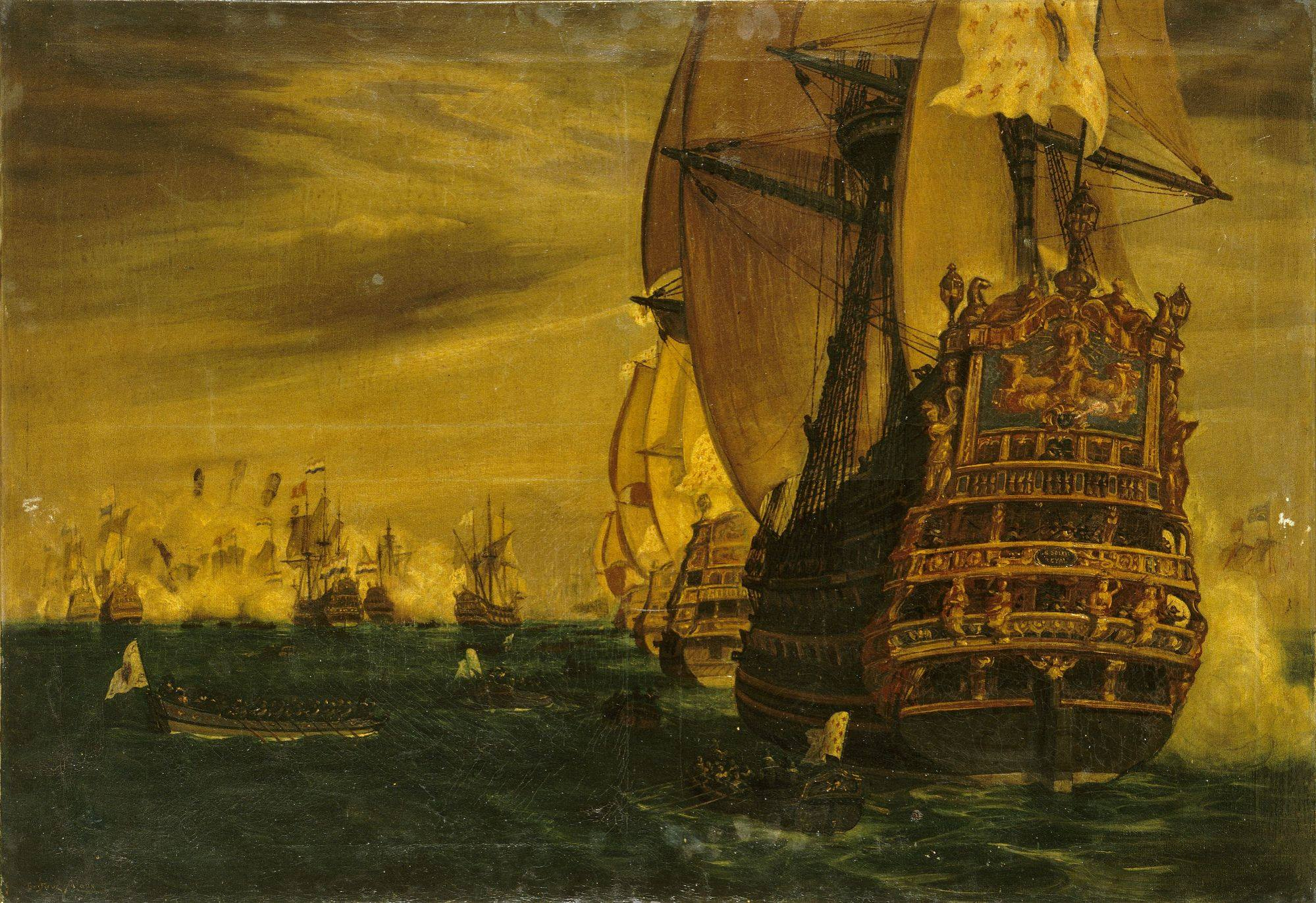
1928 painting of the Battle of Beachy Head

In July Torrington gave Wheler command of a squadron of eleven ships and sent him to blockade Brest. While off the port he captured a French warship and 26 other vessels, many of them carrying stores and ammunition for the Jacobite forces in Ireland. Wheler took command of the 90-gun HMS Albemarle and fought at the Battle of Beachy Head on 10 July 1690, and at the Battle of Barfleur on 19 May 1692. He was promoted to rear-admiral of the blue in October 1692, and sent out to the Jamaica station in command of a squadron. He arrived at Madeira on 26 January, but did not reach Barbados until 1 March. There a council of war was convened, and the decision taken to attack Martinique. However no preparations had been made, and the proposed 800 men from the local militia that would be used to supplement the troops had yet to be raised. The Captain-General of the Leeward Islands, Colonel Codrington, had not been approached for assistance either. The expedition therefore did not depart until 30 March, arriving at Martinique on 1 April, but still without Codrington and his reinforcements. The British force consisted of 2,300 soldiers, including 800 men from the Barbados militia, and a further 1,500 sailors detached under Wheler's command. Codrington and his men arrived on 9 April, and a landing was effected on 17 April. After some initial success in securing strategic positions and repulsing a French attack, the expedition suffered heavy losses through sickness, with 1,000 men succumbing, and the British assault petered out. A council was held on 20 April, and the expedition was abandoned, and the men evacuated.

Codrington then proposed an attack on Guadeloupe, but Wheler had orders to leave the West Indies by May, and was doubtful that the inexperienced and sickly troops would have much chance of success. Wheler sailed to Boston, arriving there on 12 June, and proposing to the governor there, Sir William Phips, an attack on Quebec. Phips demurred, on the grounds that there were no troops available. While anchored at Boston he had invited Reverend Cotton Mather to come out to his ships to read a sermon to the men. Mather had been rowed out on Phips's barge, but had become seasick and had turned back. Instead Mather gave a sermon in his meeting house on shore, which was attended by a number of the British commanders, including Wheler.

Wheler then took his fleet to Newfoundland, but there he found Placentia heavily defended, and decided against an attack. He returned to Britain in October, with his crews ravaged by disease. Despite the failure of his expedition, the causes were attributed to circumstances beyond his control, and he was promoted to rear-admiral of the red and ordered to the Mediterranean as commander of a fleet.

== Voyage to the Mediterranean ==
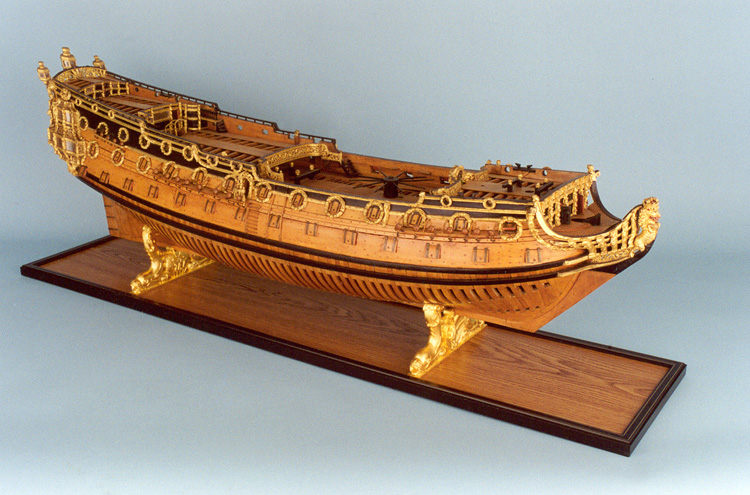
Model of Wheler's flagship, HMS Sussex

The fleet, consisting of twenty ships of the line and frigates was ready by November but were detained in port by contrary winds until 27 December. He was finally able to sail from Plymouth, and was joined on 29 December by a merchant convoy, which he escorted as far as Cape Finisterre. With him were Vice-Admiral Sir Thomas Hopsonn, Rear-Admiral John Nevell and a Dutch squadron under Gerard Callenburgh. French vessels were sighted on a number of occasions, but managed to outsail the British ships Wheler sent to chase them. Wheler was reluctant to separate his squadron after the disaster that had befallen George Rooke some months previously, where part of his scattered convoy had been captured by the French.

Wheler reached Cádiz on 19 January, having safely brought his convoy of 165 merchant ships to port. The homeward bound convoy was placed under Hopsonn, and after staying at Cádiz a month, Wheler left port on 10 February and attempted to pass through the straits, but was prevented by contrary winds. He tried again on 17 February but was again forced back by the winds, which rose to a hurricane early on the morning of 19 February. The fleet was scattered, several ships mistaking the Bay of Gibraltar for the straits and running into it. There a number foundered or were wrecked, including HMS Cambridge, and Wheler's flagship, HMS Sussex. Sussex foundered at 5 in the morning of 19 February, with the loss of all but two of her crew of 550. Wheler's body was washed up two days later, 'much mangled'. There were reports that it was embalmed and sent back to England for burial, but these were judged doubtful by historian J. K. Laughton.

== Family and issue ==
In 1685 Wheler married Arabella, daughter of Sir Clifford Clifton, 3rd Bt. and his wife Frances Finch, and by her he had three boys and a girl, the latter named Anna-Sophia. The eldest boy was named Charles, and with Anna-Sophia was mentioned in Wheler's will of 1692. These presumably died young, as later records mention only two surviving children; the second son, named William, and a third son, named Francis, who was probably born in either 1693 or 1694. William's son, Francis, produced a daughter named Jane who married Henry Hood, 2nd Viscount Hood, becoming the mother of Samuel Hood, 2nd Baron Bridport.
