= Charles Bruce-Gardner =

English industrialist (1887–1960)

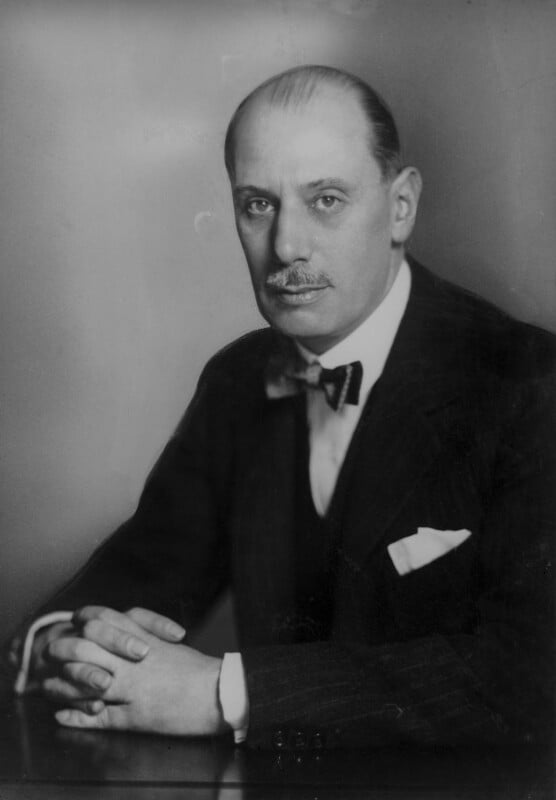
Gardner in the 1920s

Sir Charles Bruce-Gardner, 1st Baronet (6 November 1887 – 1 October 1960), born Charles Bruce Gardner, was an English industrialist, specialising in mechanical and aircraft production.

Born in London, he was the son of Henry Gardner and Florence Arliss. Educated at St. Dunstan's College and Battersea College of Technology, he was registered as a member of the Institution of Mechanical Engineers.

A director of John Summers & Sons from 1913, he subsequently became chairman of the John Lysaght Group He was also deputy-chairman of the Steel Company of Wales, a director of the Consett Iron Company and GKN, and chairman of British Iron and Steel Federation. He later became president of the Iron and Steel Institute.

Appointed an industrial advisor to the Governor of the Bank of England, as Chairman of the Society of British Aircraft Constructors from 1938 to 1943, he advised on the Shadow factory plan.

Changing his name by deed poll on 21 December 1937 to Charles Bruce-Gardner, he was knighted in the 1938 New Year Honours, having the honour conferred on 17 February 1938. He was created 1st Baronet Bruce-Gardner, 'of Frilford, in the County of Berkshire', on 12 February 1945.

Coat of arms of Charles Bruce-Gardner
Crest In front of a miner’s pick and gad in saltire a thistle leaved and slipped all Proper. Escutcheon Or a saltire couped Gules charged with five bezants. On a chief Gules a bee volant Proper between two roses Argent barbed and seeded Proper. Motto Labore Et Virtute (By Work And Strength)

Baronetage of the United Kingdom
New creation	Baronet (of Frilford); 1945–1960	Succeeded by Douglas Bruce-Gardner
