= HMS Pendennis (1679) =

Ship of the line of the Royal Navy

History

England
- Name: HMS Pendennis
- Ordered: April 1677
- Builder: Phineas Pett, Chatham Dockyard
- Launched: 1679
- Commissioned: 25 September 1688
- Fate: Wrecked on the Kentish Knock, 26 October 1689

General characteristics
- Class & type: 70-gun third rate ship of the line
- Tons burthen: 105131/94 tons(bm)
- Length: 150 ft 10 in (45.97 m) gundeck; 121 ft 9 in (37.11 m) keel for tonnage
- Beam: 40 ft 3.5 in (12.28 m)
- Draught: 17 ft 0 in (5.18 m)
- Depth of hold: 17 ft 0 in (5.18 m)
- Propulsion: Sails
- Sail plan: Full-rigged ship
- Armament: 1677 Establishment 72/60 guns; 26 × demi-cannons 54 cwt – 9.5 ft (LD); 26 × 12-pdr guns 32 cwt – 9 ft (UD); 10 × sakers 16 cwt – 7 ft (QD); 4 × sakers 16 cwt – 7 ft (Fc); 5 × 5 3-pdr guns 5 cwt – 5 ft (RH)

HMS Pendennis was a 70-gun third rate ship of the line of the Kingdom of England built at Chatham in 1677/79. She was in the War of English Succession. She was in the Battle of Bantry Bay. She was wrecked on the Kentish Knock in October 1689.

She was the first vessel to bear the name Pendennis in the English and Royal Navy.

== Construction and specifications ==
She was ordered in April 1677 to be built at Chatham Dockyard under the guidance of Master Shipwright Phineas Pett. She was launched in 1679. Her dimensions were a gundeck of 150 feet 10 inches (45.97 metres) with a keel of 121 feet 9 inches (37.11 metres) for tonnage calculation with a breadth of 40 feet 3.5 inches (12.28 metres) and a depth of hold of 17 feet 0 inches (5.18 metres). Her builder's measure tonnage was calculated as 1,05131/94 tons. Her draught was 17 feet 0 inches (5.18 metres).

Her initial gun armament was in accordance with the 1677 Establishment with 72/60 guns consisting of twenty-six demi-cannons (54 cwt, 9.5 ft) on the lower deck, twenty-four 12-pounder guns (32 cwt, 9 ft) on the upper deck, ten sakers (16 cwt, 7 ft) on the quarterdeck and four sakers (16 cwt, 7 ft) on the foc's'le with four 3-pounder guns (5 cwt, 5 ft) on the poop deck or roundhouse. By 1688 she would carry 70 guns as per the 1685 Establishment . Their initial manning establishment would be for a crew of 460/380/300 personnel.

== Commissioned service ==
She was commissioned on 25 September 1688 under the command of Captain Sir William Booth sailing with Dartmouth's Fleet in October 1688. . On 16 March 1689, Booth, a secret Jacobite, attempted to involve the lieutenants of the ship in an attempt to defect to France while the ship was lying at Sheerness. However, he was unsuccessful in persuading them and instead fled to France, fearing discovery. Captain George Churchill (brother of the Later Duke of Marlborough) held command in 1690. She was at the Battle of Bantry Bay on 1 May 1689.

== Loss ==
She was wrecked on the Kentish Knock on 26 October 1689.
