= Terra Nova School =

Coordinates: 53.227617°N 2.307201°W

- Holmes Chapel, Cheshire, CW4 8BT; England

Information
- Type: Preparatory day and boarding school
- Motto: Labor et ludus
- Established: 1897
- Local authority: Cheshire East
- Department for Education URN: 111472 Tables
- Headmistress: Christabel Westall
- Gender: Coeducational
- Age: 3 to 13
- Enrolment: 300~
- Website: www.tnschool.co.uk

Terra Nova School is a prep school in Cheshire, England for children from two and a half to thirteen years of age. It began as a school for boys in 1897, and today educates boys and girls.

Children aged two and a half to seven attend the pre-prep school, and pupils aged eight to thirteen attend the prep school.

Since 1939 the school has occupied a site of just over 36 acres (15 ha) including playing fields, in a rural area within the bounds of Holmes Chapel. At the core of the site is Jodrell Hall, a country house begun in 1779 with additions in 1835.

== Notable pupils ==
- Will Carling, former Captain of the England Rugby team
- Ben Ainslie, the most successful sailor in Olympic history
- Hamish Watson, Scottish Rugby international
- J. G. Farrell, Booker Prize winning writer
- Sir Robert Bruce-Gardner, 10 June 1943 - 6 September 2017, Conservator of paintings at the Courtauld Institute
- Asif Aziz, billionaire landlord

== See also ==
- Listed buildings in Twemlow
