= Blessing of Burntisland =

17th-century shipwreck in the Firth of Forth, Scotland

The Blessing of Burntisland was a wooden ferry that carried people and goods 5 miles (8 km) across the Firth of Forth, Scotland, between Burntisland and Leith in the early 17th century. It sank in 1633 carrying a large amount of royal treasure. The shipwreck has never been found.

== History ==
In 1626, the ferry was granted Letters of Marque, a licence to attack or capture enemy vessels during the Thirty Years' War.

=== Sinking ===
The ferry capsized during a storm on 10 July 1633. Only two of its thirty-five passengers and crew survived. It was also carrying 20 carts of jewels, plate and textiles belonging to Charles I, which included, among other valuable objects, a 280-piece silver dinner service commissioned by Henry VIII.

Charles, undertaking an official tour of Scotland after his coronation there, had been staying at his hunting lodge in Falkland. He watched the ferry sink from the deck of his flagship, the Dreadnought. He blamed the sinking on a coven of witches, who were subsequently put on trial and executed in Lancashire. The royal cargo, of between four and five tons of gold and silver, was estimated to be worth £100,000 at the time, US$400 million in 1997, and £500 million in 1999.

== Attempts to find the wreck ==
Marine archaeologists have long searched for the wreck, but it has never been found, not least because 500 other shipwrecks lie at the bottom of the Firth of Forth.

An eight-year search by the Burntisland Heritage Trust and the Royal Navy began in 1991. The Trust intended to open a museum in Burntisland exhibiting any artefacts that could be salvaged from the Blessing. After finding 200 possible wreck sites within a two-mile area of the estuary, one wreck was closely inspected in 1993, and divers found pottery, shoe leather and bolts dating from the 1600s. The search ended in 1999 with HMS Roebuck discovering a wreck 1 mile (1.6 km) off the coast of Burntisland. Divers were sent 120 feet (37 m) below the waves to verify the computerised survey images, and the Secretary of State for Scotland gave the site legal protection to keep treasure hunters at bay.

In August 2026, Burntisland Heritage notified the British Receiver of Wreck it had located an unidentified wooden shipwreck in the Forth, one mile from Burntisland. A timber sample was obtained from the wreck for carbon dating.

== See also ==
- The Wash § King John and his jewels
- HMS Sussex (1693)
- HMS Lutine (1793)

== Bibliography ==
- Farrington, Karen (1999). Shipwrecks. Thunder Bay Press. ISBN 978-1-57145-159-0.
- Happer, Richard; Steward, Mark (2015). River Forth: From Source to Sea. Amberley. ISBN 978-1-4456-4885-9.
- Lavery, Brian (2007). Shield of Empire: The Royal Navy in Scotland. Birlinn. ISBN 978-1-84158-513-0.
- Saari, Peggy; Pear, Nancy; Baker, Daniel B. (1997). Explorers & Discoverers. Vol. 5. Gale. ISBN 978-0-7876-1990-9.
