= Listed buildings in Twemlow =

Twemlow is a civil parish in Cheshire East, England. It contains nine buildings that are recorded in the National Heritage List for England as designated listed buildings. Of these, one is listed at Grade II*, the middle of the three grades, and the others are at Grade II, the lowest grade. Apart from the village of Twemlow Green, the parish is rural. The listed buildings, other than one, are two country houses, one of which has been converted into a school, and structures associated with them. The exception is a timber-framed cottage that has been moved from elsewhere. Twemlow Viaduct, part of which is in the parish, is listed under Holmes Chapel.

== Key ==
Grade	Criteria
II*	Particularly important buildings of more than special interest
II	Buildings of national importance and special interest

== Buildings ==
Name and location	Photograph	Date	Notes	Grade
Twemlow Hall; 53.21228°N 2.32835°W	—	Late 17th century	A country house that was altered in 1810 and again in 1974. It is built in brick on a stone plinth and has slate roofs. The house is in two storeys, and has a front of five bays. On the front are three gables with bargeboards and finials. Above the doorway is a tablet with the crest of the Booth family. The windows are sashes.	II
The Gables; 53.21574°N 2.32874°W		Late 17th century	A cottage that was moved from Plumley in 1974. It is timber-framed on a sandstone plinth with plastered panels and a tiled roof. The cottage is in a single storey with an attic, and has a front of three bays. The windows are mullioned, those in the upper floor being in gabled dormers with bargeboards.	II
Dovecote and pigsties, Jodrell Hall; 53.22870°N 2.30657°W	—	Late 17th century	The dovecote is in brick on a stone plinth and has a stone-slate pyramidal roof with a weathervane. It has a square plan, and is in two storeys with a basement. In the basement is a pig sty, and the original holes under the eaves have been blocked. Inside are nest holes in all the walls. The dovecote and pig sty are also a scheduled monument.	II*
Farm buildings, Jodrell Hall; 53.22829°N 2.30687°W	—	Late 17th century	The former farm buildings have been converted for school use. They are built in brick on a stone plinth with slate roofs. The buildings form a U-shaped plan, they are in two storeys, and have fronts of four, five and six bays. Most of the windows are casements.	II
Jodrell Hall; 53.22754°N 2.30724°W	—	1779	Originally a country house, later becoming Terra Nova School. It is built in brick with stone dressings and has a slate roof. The original part is in three storeys with an attic, and has a five-bay front. It also has a three-bay north wing in two storeys with an attic. In 1885 John Douglas added a three-bay two-storey south wing and a porch. The older part has a gabled pediment containing an oculus, and the new wing has shaped gables.	II
Gate piers, Jodrell Hall; 53.22866°N 2.30834°W	—	c. 1779	The gate piers are at the entrance to the drive and are in sandstone. They are square in plan and rusticated with moulded caps and ball finials on hemispherical supports.	II
Outbuilding, Twemlow Hall; 53.21251°N 2.32722°W	—	Mid-18th century (probable)	The outbuilding is built in brick and is in 1½ storeys. It contains a variety of windows and doorways, and a pitch hole. On the building is a clock face, above which is a hexagonal belfry.	II
Outbuilding, Twemlow Hall; 53.21236°N 2.32718°W	—	Mid-18th century (probable)	Originally a carriage house, the outbuilding is built in brick with a hipped slate roof, and is in a single storey. In the projecting gabled centre is an archway with voussoirs and a keystone. Flanking the archway are sash windows, and on the roof is a hexagonal belfry with a domed top and a weathervane.	II
Stable block, Twemlow Hall; 53.21246°N 2.32752°W	—	Mid-18th century (probable)	The stable block is built in brick with a slate roof. It is in a single storey, and contains stable doors and sash windows.	II

== See also ==
- Listed buildings in Holmes Chapel
- Listed buildings in Goostrey
- Listed buildings in Lower Withington
- Listed buildings in Swettenham
- Listed buildings in Brereton
- Listed buildings in Cranage
