= Swettenham Hall =

Country house in Swettenham, Cheshire, England

Coordinates: 53.19564°N 2.28677°W

Swettenham Hall is a country house standing to the southeast of the village of Swettenham, Cheshire, England. It dates from the 17th century and was remodelled in the 19th century. The house is constructed in pebbledashed brick on a stone plinth with a slate roof. It has a symmetrical façade in seven bays. The central bay has a single-storey canted bay window, and the second and sixth bays have two-storey canted bay windows. All the windows are sashes. At the rear of the house is a large three-bay canted bay window containing three pairs of French windows, above which are gables. The house is recorded in the National Heritage List for England as a designated Grade II listed building. Also listed at Grade II is a range of farm buildings to the east of the hall dating from the middle of the 18th century, and a private chapel to the northwest of the hall built in 1852.

== History ==
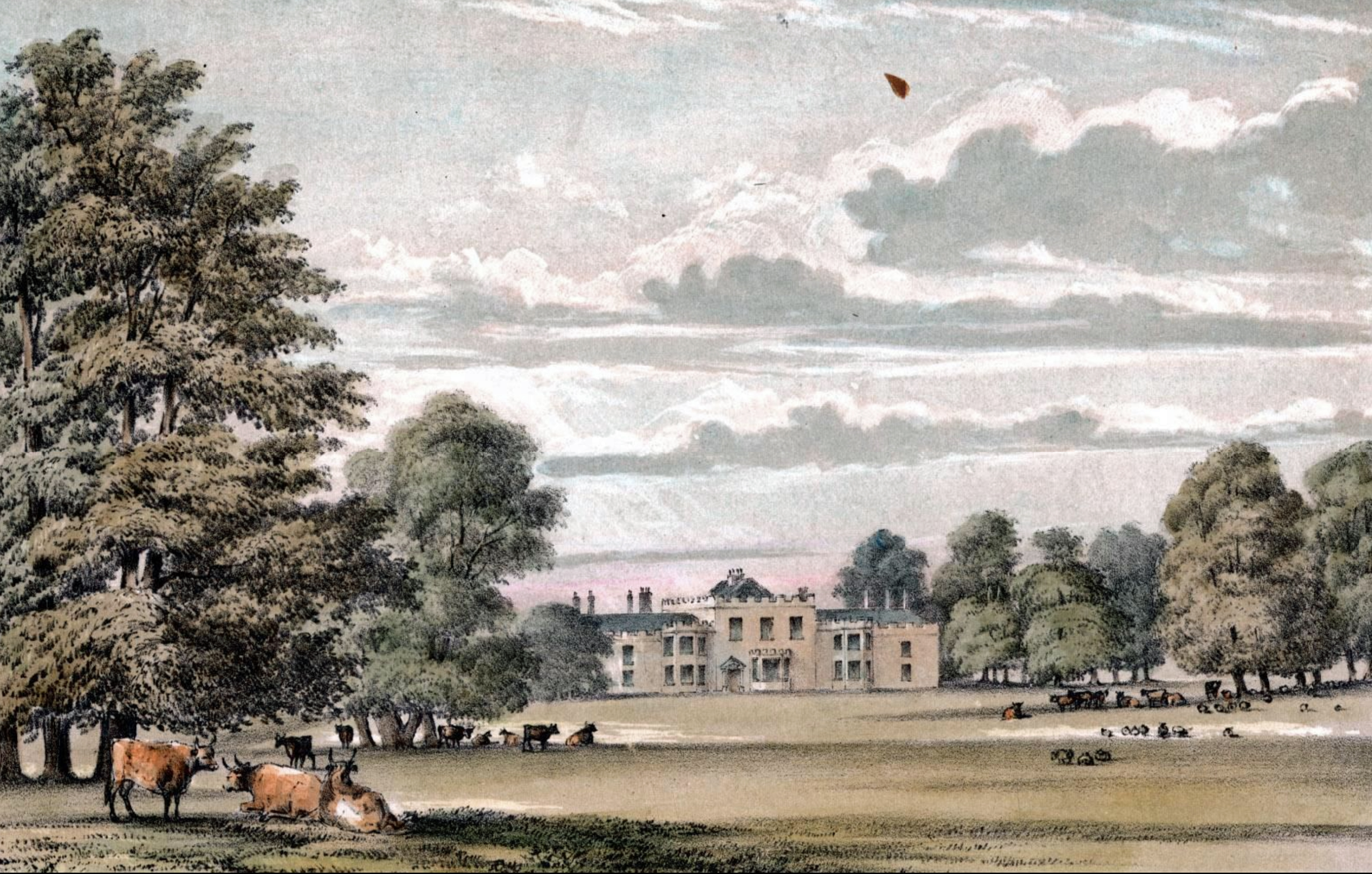
Engraving of Swettenham Hall 1850

Swettenham Hall was built in about 1678 by Thomas Swettenham (1642-1713). There are two door head tablets in the former stables of the Hall which record this. The first is the tablet with the date 1678 and the initials S-TM. This stands for Thomas and Margaret Swettenham. Thomas married in 1666 Margaret Stanley (1629-1681), daughter of Sir Thomas Stanley of Alderley, Cheshire. After she died in 1681 he married Frances Mainwaring in 1684. The second door head tablet with the initials S-TF which stands for Thomas and Frances with the date 1696.

When Thomas died in 1713 his son William Swettenham (1670-1736) inherited th Hall. It then descended in the Swettenham family until it came to Thomas John Wybault Swettenham (1804-1861) in 1825 on the death of his father. In 1829 he married Anna Maria Alen (1814-1879} from Dublin. It appears that it was he who added the additions with the stucco, canted bays and castellated entrance front. In 1850 his new additions were illustrated in a popular book of that time. The illustration is shown.

The couple had no children so when Thomas died in 1861 his wife Anna Maria continued to live at the Hall until her death in 1876. After she died the property was inherited by Thomas’s nephew Robert Warren who added Swettenham to his name.

Robert Warren Swettenham (1836-1902) was the son of Thomas’s sister Sarah Eaton Swettenham and her husband Michael Warren. In 1865 he married Amelia Marion Wybault (1840-1927) who was the daughter of Joseph William Wybault of Cheltenham. The couple had six children. On occasions they let the Hall for several years and lived in other parts of England. In 1889 it was let to John Morton Toler whose son Thomas Clayton Toler later bought the property.

When Robert died in 1902 his eldest son Major Thomas Robert Warren Swettenham (1867-1915) inherited the house. He went to the Royal Military Academy Sandhurst and in 1889 was gazette as a Lieutenant and rose rapidly through the ranks. He served in the military until the War in 1914 when he was sent to France to fight. However in 1915 he was killed. He has a memorial plaque on Menin Gate.

For some years before Thomas’s death the Hall had been rented to Harold Lucas Behrens. After Thomas died the property was advertised for sale in 1919 and it was bought by the Behrens family.

Harold Lucas Behrens (1874-1952) was an engineer and inventor. In 1898 he married Ethel Rose Beddington (1876-1934). The couple had three sons and one daughter. In 1931 they sold the hall to Major Thomas Clayton Toler.

Major Thomas Clayton Toler (1862-1940) was the Chairman of Cheshire County Council. He was married twice. His first wife died in 1899 and in 1901 he married Gertrude Marianne Wilkinson (1875-1962) The couple had five children one of whom was a war hero and received the Military Cross in 1945. His story and photo can be seen at this reference.

In 1964 at the age of 28 Robert Sangster (1936-2004), a well known thoroughbred and racehorse owner bought the property and turned it into a stud. He was the son of Vernon Sangster {1899-1986) the wealthy founder of the Vernon Football Pools. Robert married three times. His first wife Christine Street (1938-2000) who was a fashion model lived with him at Swettenham Hall until 1975. Some time after this he sold the Hall to Robert McAlpine but retained some rights over the Stud. In 1987 they both sold the whole property.

== See also ==
- Listed buildings in Swettenham
