= List of fellows of the Royal Society elected in 1955 =

This article lists fellows of the Royal Society elected in 1955.

== Fellows ==
1. Sir David Robert Bates
2. George Washington Corner
3. E. J. H. Corner
4. Sir Alan Cottrell
5. Samuel Devons
6. Allan Watt Downie
7. Kingsley Charles Dunham
8. David John Finney
9. Alexander Fleck, 1st Baron Fleck
10. Kenneth James Franklin
11. Sir William Hawthorne
12. Donald Holroyde Hey
13. Sir Harold Percival Himsworth
14. Sir Andrew Huxley
15. Reginald W. James
16. Dan Lewis
17. John Wilfrid Linnett
18. Sir Bernard Lovell
19. Otto Lowenstein
20. Raymond Lyttleton
21. Alexander George Ogston
22. Guido Pontecorvo
23. James Arthur Ramsay
24. Frederick Clifford Tompkins
25. Arthur Geoffrey Walker
26. George Philip Wells

== Foreign members ==
1. Werner Heisenberg
2. Lise Meitner
3. Otto Renner
