= HMS Sussex (1693) =

Ship of the line of the Royal Navy

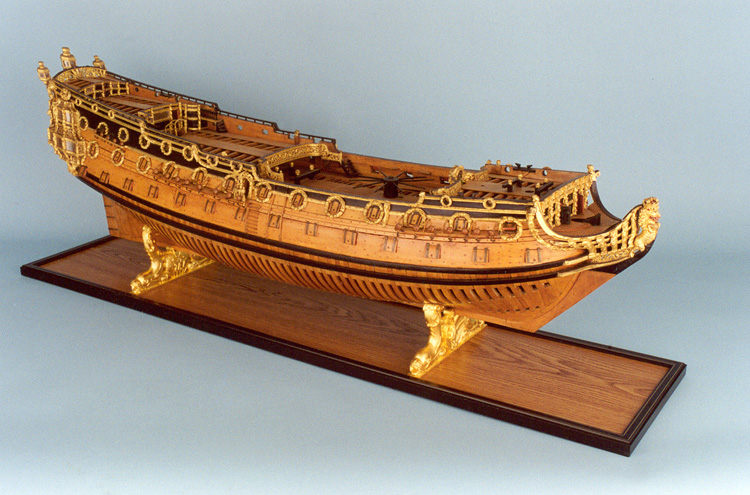
- Model of HMS Sussex, starboard

History

England
- Name: Sussex
- Builder: Lee, Chatham Dockyard
- Launched: 11 April 1693
- Fate: Wrecked, 1694

General characteristics
- Class & type: 80-gun third-rate ship of the line
- Tons burthen: 1263 bm
- Length: 157 ft 2 in (47.9 m) (gundeck)
- Beam: 41 ft 4 in (12.6 m)
- Depth of hold: 17 ft 1.5 in (5.2 m)
- Propulsion: Sails
- Sail plan: Full-rigged ship
- Armament: 80 guns of various weights of shot

HMS Sussex was an 80-gun third-rate ship of the line of the English Royal Navy, lost in a severe storm on 1 March 1694 off Gibraltar. On board were possibly 10 tons (330,000 troy oz) of gold coins. This could now be worth more than $500 million, including the bullion and antiquity values, making it one of the most valuable wrecks ever.

== History ==
Sussex was launched at Chatham Dockyard on 11 April 1693, and was the pride of the Royal Navy. As the flagship of Admiral Sir Francis Wheler, she set sail from Portsmouth on 27 December 1693, escorting a fleet of 48 warships and 166 merchant ships to the Mediterranean.

'Nov. 22. Kensington. Instructions for Sir Francis Wheler, knight, commander-in-chief of a squadron fitted out for the Straits. As soon as you join the Spanish armada, pursuant to the instructions of the Lords of the Admiralty, you shall act as most advisable for the annoying of the French, and shall give the Duke of Savoy notice of your arrival in the Mediterranean; and in case he desire your co-operation in any design against the French, you shall use your best endeavours to bring the same to a happy issue. During your stay in the Mediterranean you are to correspond as frequently as you can with Viscount Galway, our envoy extraordinary to the Duke of Savoy; and, as far as may be consistent with the service you are employed in, to act according to the advices you shall receive from him.'

After a short stopover in Cádiz, the fleet entered the Mediterranean. On 27 February a violent storm hit the flotilla near the Strait of Gibraltar and in the early morning of the third day, Sussex sank. All but two "Turks" of the 500 crew on board drowned, including Admiral Wheler, whose body, legend has it, was found on the eastern shore of the rock of Gibraltar in his night-shirt.

Due to the extent of the fatalities, it was not possible to establish the exact cause of the disaster, but it has been noted that 'the disaster seemed to confirm suspicions already voiced about the inherent instability of 80-gun ships with only two decks, such as the Sussex, and a third deck would be added for new ships of this armament.'

Besides Sussex, 12 other ships of the fleet sank. There were approximately 1,200 casualties in total, in what remains one of the worst disasters in the history of the Royal Navy.

== Treasure hunt ==
Between 1998 and 2001, the American Company Odyssey Marine Exploration searched for the Sussex and claimed that it had located the shipwreck at a depth of 800 metres (2,624 feet).

In October 2002, Odyssey agreed to a deal with the ship's rightful owner, the British government, on a formula for sharing any potential spoils. Odyssey would get 80 percent of the proceeds up to $45 million, 50 percent from $45 million to $500 million and 40 percent above $500 million. The British government would get the rest.

The Americans were then poised to start the excavation in 2003, but it was delayed amid a raft of complaints from some archaeological quarters, denouncing it as a dangerous precedent for the "ransacking" of shipwrecks by private firms under the aegis of archaeological research.

Just as Odyssey was about to start an excavation, it was stopped by the Spanish authorities, in particular the government of Andalusia in January 2006.

In March 2007, Andalusia gave assent for the excavation to start with the condition that Spanish archeologists would take part in the excavation in order to ascertain that the shipwreck to be excavated is indeed the Sussex and not a Spanish galleon. On the same day, Odyssey Marine sent one of its survey vessels from Gibraltar, west of Cádiz to begin its Black Swan Project, which has resulted in Spain taking action against the company and cancelling its agreement to cooperate on the Sussex project.

== See also ==
- List of United Kingdom disasters by death toll
- Blessing of Burntisland
- Black Swan Project
