= Listed buildings in Swettenham =

Swettenham is a civil parish in Cheshire East, England. It contains 12 buildings that are recorded in the National Heritage List for England as designated listed buildings. Of these, two are listed at Grade II*, the middle of the three grades, and the others are at Grade II. Apart from the village of Swettenham, the parish is rural.. The listed buildings consist of country houses with associated structures, a former farmhouse, a former water mill and kiln, a church, and a public house.

== Key ==
Grade	Criteria
II*	Particularly important buildings of more than special interest
II	Buildings of national importance and special interest

== Buildings ==
Name and location	Photograph	Date	Notes	Grade
Swettenham Hall; 53.19565°N 2.28680°W	—	17th century	A country house that was remodelled in the 19th century in Georgian style. It is built in stuccoed brick on a stone plinth and has a slate roof. The house is in two storeys, and has a symmetrical seven-bay front. On the front are canted bay windows. The windows are sashes, and at the rear are French windows. Much of the building is castellated.	II
Outbuildings, Swettenham Hall; 53.19545°N 2.28557°W	—	17th century	These are farm buildings that include stables, a cottage, offices, and an 18th-century dovecote. The buildings are in brick and have roofs of stone-slate or Welsh slates. Most are in two storeys, with the dovecote slightly higher. Features include mullioned windows, finials, and a datestone over which is a coat of arms. The dovecote has a clock in an oculus, and a pyramidal roof with a weathervane.	II
Swettenham Mill; 53.20187°N 2.28470°W	—	1675	A water mill that was extended in 1714, and again in 1765. It is partly timber-framed with brick nogging, and partly in brick, and it has a tiled roof. The building is in three storeys, and has a four-bay front and a single-bay wing, giving it an L-shaped plan. The windows are casements. The mill has been converted for residential use, conserving some of the machinery.	II
Swettenham Arms; 53.20130°N 2.30089°W		Late 17th century	A public house that originated as a nunnery providing accommodation for mourners awaiting funerals at the church. It is built in brick with roofs of stone-slate and tiles. The building is in three sections. These have, from the left, two storeys with an attic, two storeys, and one storey. On the front is a gabled porch, and the windows are casements.	II
Clonterbrook House; 53.20188°N 2.26871°W	—	1697	A former manor house in brick with a stone-slate roof, it is in two storeys with an attic, and has a five-bay front. The doorway has a moulded frame and architrave and above it is a flat inscribed hood. Inside the house is some exposed timber-framing.	II*
St Peter's Church; 53.20134°N 2.29962°W		Before 1720	The timber-framed church was mainly encased in brick in 1720. Romanesque restorations were carried out in 1846 by J. M. Derrick, there was a restoration in Gothic Revival style in 1865, and another restoration in 1936–38. There is some exposed timber framing, but the tower and most of the north aisle are in brick, and the south aisle in stone. The church consists of a nave, aisles, a chancel and a west tower. The roof is in slate and stone-slate, and the architectural styles are a mixture of Romanesque Revival and Gothic Revival. The tower contains a clock face in a diamond-shaped surround, and at the top is a brick parapet and vase finials.	II*
Music room, Clonterbrook House; 53.20194°N 2.26903°W	—	Early 18th century	The music room has been developed from a shippon. It is in brick with a stone-slate roof, it is in a single storeys, and has a four-bay front. Above the doorway in the north end is a blocked pitch hole. Along the east side are three pairs of French windows over which are oeil-de-boeuf windows. On the roof is a sandstone ridge on which is a bellcote with arched openings and a pyramidal roof with a weathervane.	II
Office, Clonterbrook House; 53.20196°N 2.26841°W	—	Early 18th century	The office was originally a bakery. It is in brick with a stone-slate roof. The building is in a single storey, and has a single-bay front. On the front is a projecting brick oven, flanked by casement windows.	II
Picture gallery, Clonterbrook House; 53.20211°N 2.26909°W	—	Early 18th century	Originally a barn, it has been converted into a picture gallery. The building is in brick with roofs of stone slab, it is in two storeys, and has a front of three bays. It contains doorways, casement windows, and ventilation holes. Inside is panelling moved from Eaton Hall, Cheshire, and a flight of stairs, said to be from Shavington Park in Shropshire.	II
Grain kiln, Swettenham Mill; 53.20173°N 2.28458°W	—	c. 1765	The grain kiln is built in brick with a tiled roof. It is in a single storey, and has a floor of tiles for drying grain that was heated from below.	II
Private chapel, Swettenham Hall; 53.19606°N 2.28762°W	—	1852	The private chapel is built in brick with diapering and stone dressings, and stands on a stone plinth. It has a slate roof, and is in three bays. The chapel consists of a nave, a chancel with a canted apse, and a tower. In the tower is a vestry with an organ loft above. The tower starts square and rises to become octagonal, with coped gables at the top. Above the doorway in the northwest end is a rose window, and along the sides of the chapel are pairs of lancet windows.	II
Manor Farmhouse; 53.20266°N 2.30344°W		c. 1860	The farmhouse has been converted into a private house. It is built in red brick with blue brick diapering and has a tiled roof. The house is in two storeys and has a two-bay front. At the west end if a gabled porch with a hipped roof. The windows are casements. The building is said to have been designed by William Butterfield.	II

== See also ==
- Listed buildings in Twemlow
- Listed buildings in Lower Withington
- Listed buildings in Marton
- Listed buildings in Somerford Booths
- Listed buildings in Brereton
- Listed buildings in Holmes Chapel
