= Regent's American College London =

Coordinates: 51.5257°N 0.1552°W

- RACL
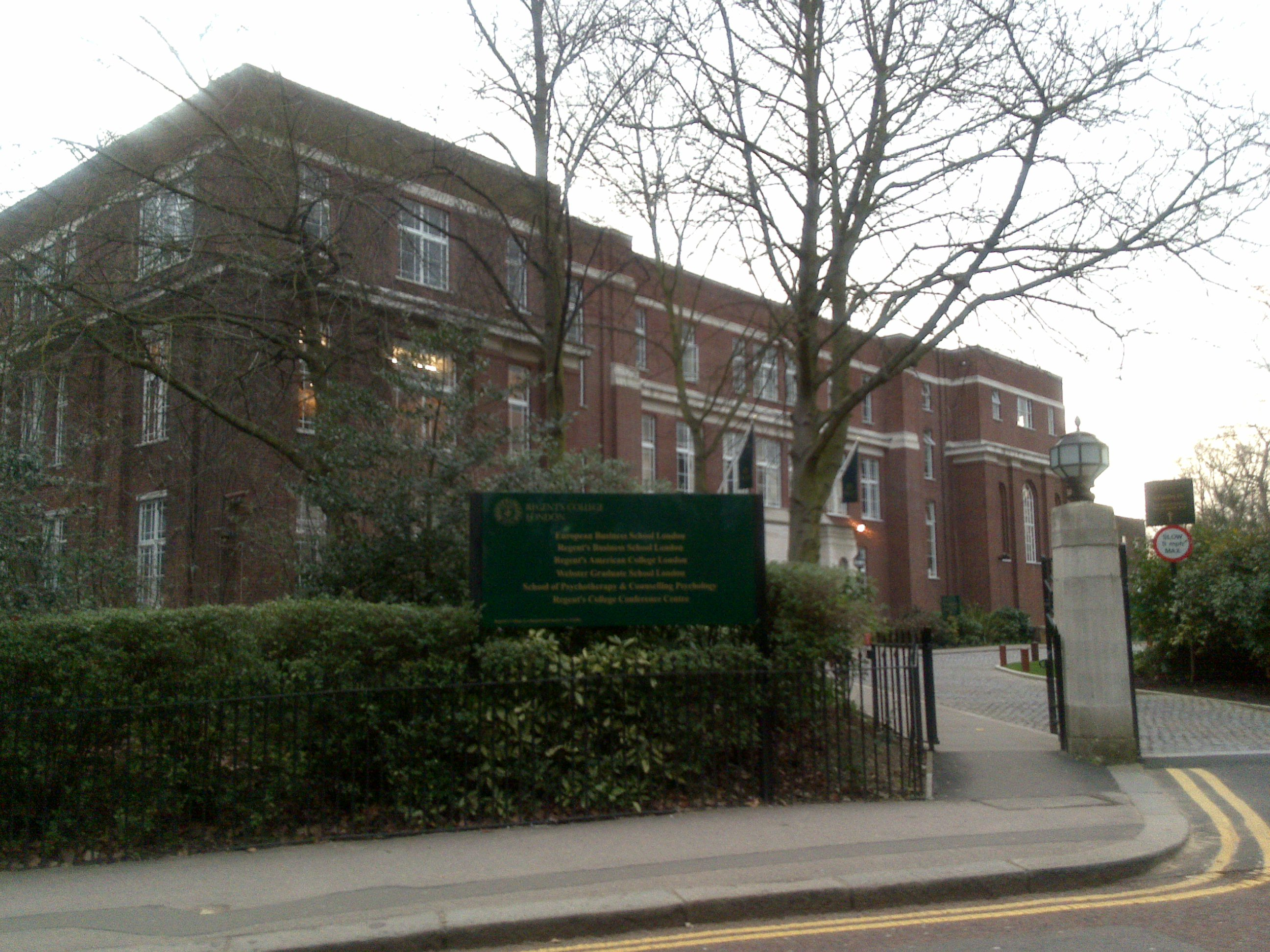
- Regent's University London
- Former names: British American College London
- Established: 1994
- Location: London, United Kingdom
- Website: www.regents.ac.uk/RACL

Regent's American College London, (commonly abbreviated to "RACL"), is a part of Regent's University London, the campus of which was originally built in 1913 in the midst of Regent's Park in central London, UK. Until 2007 the college was known as British American College London. RACL was the official London campus of Webster University, St. Louis, USA but the arrangement ended in 2015. As of September 2015 RACL will offer its own Liberal Arts undergraduate programmes based on the U.S. curriculum.

The student body is primarily international, with large populations from the Middle East, USA, South Asia and Eastern Europe. The college offers a wide choice of majors in management, media, international relations, politics, psychology and the liberal arts. The college brings the Liberal Arts curriculum of American higher education to the UK.

Regent's American College London registers around 400 students a year, from 65 different countries. Students come from affiliated schools, study abroad programs, as well as full-time degree seeking students.
