= HMS Nonsuch (1668) =

Frigate of the Royal Navy

History

England
- Name: HMS Nonsuch
- Ordered: 13 June 1668
- Builder: Anthony Deane, at Portsmouth Dockyard
- Launched: 22 December 1668
- Commissioned: 22 December 1668
- Captured: On 4 January 1695 by a French privateer

General characteristics
- Class & type: 36-gun fifth rate (as launched); Re-rated as 42-gun fourth rate in 1669; Re-rated as 36-gun fifth rate in 1691
- Tons burthen: 359 29/94 bm
- Length: 97 ft 3.5 in (29.7 m)(gundeck); 88 ft 3 in (26.9 m) (keel)
- Beam: 27 ft 8 in (8.4 m)
- Draught: 12 ft 8 in (3.86 m)
- Depth of hold: 10 ft 10 in (3.30 m)
- Propulsion: Sails
- Sail plan: Full-rigged ship
- Complement: 150 as Fifth Rate; 180 as Fourth Rate
- Armament: 40 in 1685: 20 demi-culverins, 16 sakers; and 4 × 3-pounder guns

HMS Nonsuch was a 36-gun fifth rate of the Royal Navy. She was an experimental fast-sailing design, built by the renowned shipwright Anthony Deane according to proposals by the Dutch naval officer Laurens van Heemskirk, who became her first captain. She was launched in December 1668, and commissioned the same day under van Heemskirk. In 1669 she was reclassed as a 42-gun Fourth rate, being commanded from 9 April by Captain Sir John Holmes. She was to spend most of her career in the Mediterranean. She was for a time based on Tangier, and was commanded by a succession of accomplished commanders who subsequently rose to flag rank in the Navy, including George Rooke from 1677 to 1680, then briefly under Cloudesley Shovell, and then Francis Wheler from 1680 to 1681. Under Wheler's command, she participated on 9 April 1681 in the capture of the Algerine 46-gun Golden Horse, along with the Fourth rate Adventure.

She reverted to a 36-gun fifth rate in 1691, and was recommissioned under Captain Richard Short, for service off New England. Command passed in January 1693 to Captain Thomas Dobbin, then in November 1693 to Captain Thomas Taylor. She was captured off the Scilly Isles on 4 January 1695 by the French 48-gun privateer Le François; renamed Le Sans Pareil, she subsequently served in the French Navy until 1697.
