= Swettenham Meadows Nature Reserve =

Nature reserve in Cheshire, England

Coordinates: 53.20421°N 2.29489°W

Swettenham Meadows is a nature reserve in Cheshire, England, on the north bank of Swettenham Brook, a short distance north east of Swettenham village and 2.5 miles (4 km) east of Holmes Chapel village (grid reference SJ804675).

The Swettenham Meadows reserve is managed by Cheshire Wildlife Trust. It covers an area of 21.5 acres (8.6 ha) and its species-rich grassland is particularly ecologically important as this type of habitat represents only 0.15% of the total land area of Cheshire. Common spotted orchid and marsh orchid thrive in the wet flushes of this highly variable grassland. Other important species include small skipper, common blue, small copper and orange tip butterflies, kingfishers, amphibians, and various Odonata.

The reserve has great ecological, recreational and historical importance to local people and is also regularly used as a centre for conservation training. On 26 April 1972 Thomas Clyde Hewlett, who was a regular visitor to, and supporter of, the Meadows, was made Baron Hewlett of Swettenham in the County of Cheshire.
