= Bruce-Gardner baronets =

Baronetcy in the Baronetage of the United Kingdom

Coats of Arms of the Bruce-Gardner baronets

The Bruce-Gardner Baronetcy, of Frilford in the County of Berkshire, is a title in the Baronetage of the United Kingdom. It was created on 12 February 1945 for Charles Bruce-Gardner. He was Industrial Advisor to the Governor of the Bank of England from 1930 to 1938 and Chairman of the Society of British Aircraft Constructors from 1938 to 1943.

== Bruce-Gardner baronets, of Frilford (1945) ==
- Sir Charles Bruce-Gardner, 1st Baronet (1887–1960)
- Sir Douglas Bruce Bruce-Gardner, 2nd Baronet (1917–1997)
- Sir Robert Henry Bruce-Gardner, 3rd Baronet (1943-2017)
- Sir Edmund Thomas Peter Bruce-Gardner, 4th Baronet (born 1982)

The heir presumptive is the present holder's brother Richard Tyndall Jowett Bruce-Gardner (born 1983).

== Notes ==
Coat of arms of Bruce-Gardner baronets

Crest
In front of a miner’s pick and gad in saltire a thistle leaved and slipped all Proper.
Escutcheon
Or a saltire couped Gules charged with five bezants. On a chief Gules a bee volant Proper between two roses Argent barbed and seeded Proper.
Motto
Labore Et Virtute (By Work And Strength)
