= Robert Bruce-Gardner =

English art conservator

Robert Bruce-Gardner

Sir Robert Henry Bruce-Gardner (10 June 1943 - 6 September 2017) was an art conservator at the Courtauld Institute of Art and expert in the use of X-Rays in examining paintings.

Coat of arms of Robert Bruce-Gardner
Crest In front of a miner’s pick and gad in saltire a thistle leaved and slipped all Proper. Escutcheon Or a saltire couped Gules charged with five bezants. On a chief Gules a bee volant Proper between two roses Argent barbed and seeded Proper. Motto Labore Et Virtute (By Work And Strength)

== See also ==
- Bruce-Gardner baronets

Baronetage of the United Kingdom
Preceded by Douglas Bruce-Gardner	Baronet (of Frilford); 1997–2017	Succeeded by Edmund Bruce-Gardner
