= Bernard Lovell =

English physicist and radio astronomer (1913–2012)

Sir Bernard Lovell OBE FRS
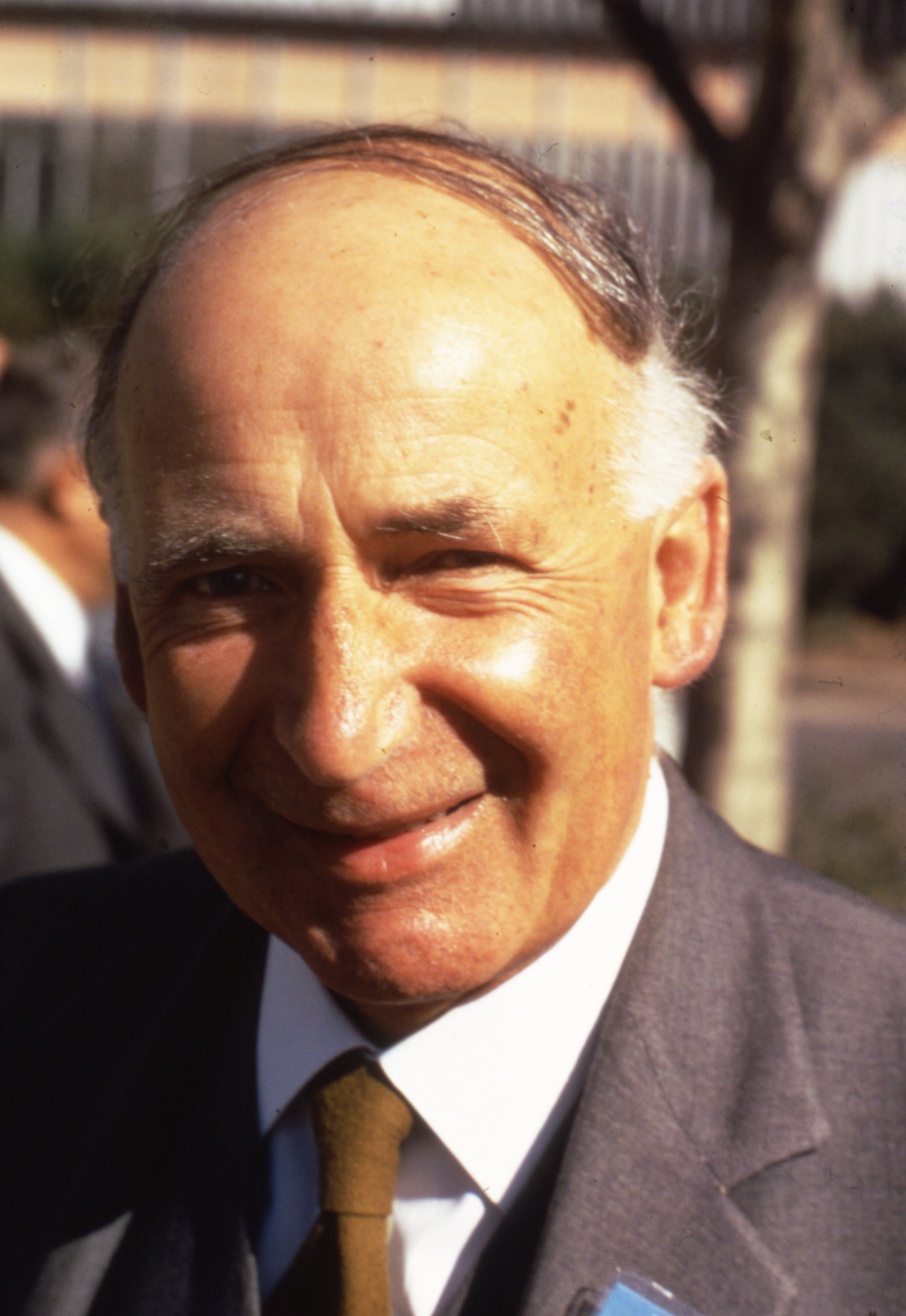
- Lovell in 1973
- Born: Alfred Charles Bernard Lovell; 31 August 1913; Oldland Common, Gloucestershire, England
- Died: 6 August 2012 (aged 98); Swettenham, Cheshire, England
- Education: University of Bristol
- Known for: Radio astronomy
- Relatives: Bryan Lovell (son)
- Awards: Royal Medal; Gold Medal of the Royal Astronomical Society; Gabor Medal and Prize; Knight Bachelor; Benjamin Franklin Medal; Dalton Medal
- Scientific career
- Fields: Astronomy; physics
- Workplaces: University of Manchester; Telecommunications Research Establishment; Jodrell Bank Observatory
- Thesis: The electrical conductivity of thin metallic films (1936)

Sir Alfred Charles Bernard Lovell (/ˈlʌvəl/ LUV-əl; 31 August 1913 – 6 August 2012) was a British physicist and radio astronomer. He was the first director of Jodrell Bank Observatory, from 1945 to 1980.

== Early life and education ==
Lovell was born at Oldland Common, Bristol, in 1913, the son of local tradesman and Methodist preacher Gilbert Lovell (1881–1956) and Emily Laura, née Adams. Gilbert Lovell was an "authority on the Bible" and, having "studied English literature and grammar", was still "bombarding his son with complaints on points of grammar, punctuation and method of speaking" when Lovell was in his forties. Lovell's childhood hobbies and interests included cricket and music, mainly the piano. He had a Methodist upbringing and attended Kingswood Grammar School.

== Career and research ==
Lovell studied physics at the University of Bristol obtaining a Bachelor of Science degree in 1934, and a PhD in 1936 for his work on the electrical conductivity of thin films. At this time, he also received lessons in music from Raymond Jones, a teacher at Bath Technical School and later an organist at Bath Abbey. The church organ was one of the main loves of his life, apart from science.

Lovell worked in the cosmic ray research team at the University of Manchester until the outbreak of the Second World War. At the beginning of the war, Lovell published his first book, Science and Civilization. During the war he worked for the Telecommunications Research Establishment (TRE) developing radar systems to be installed in aircraft, among them H2S.

In June 1942, following the crash in England of a Halifax bomber on a flight to demonstrate the H2S, Lovell aided in the recovery of the H2S's highly secret (and nearly indestructible) cavity magnetron from the plane's wreckage. All 11 on board were killed, including a number of his colleagues, notably EMI engineer Alan Blumlein. Despite the tragedy, Lovell resumed his work as the government considered the H2S radar critical to the war effort.

At the end of the Second World War, Lovell attempted to continue his studies of cosmic rays with an ex-military radar detector unit, but suffered much background interference from the electric trams on Manchester's Oxford Road. He moved his equipment to a more remote location, one which was free from such electrical interference, and where he established the Jodrell Bank Observatory, near Goostrey in Cheshire. It was an outpost of the university's botany department and had been a searchlight station during the war. In the course of his experiments, he was able to show that radar echoes could be obtained from daytime meteor showers as they entered the Earth's atmosphere and ionised the surrounding air. He was later able to determine the orbits of meteors in annual meteor showers to show they were in solar orbit and not of interstellar origin. With university funding, he constructed the then-largest steerable radio telescope in the world, which now bears his name: the Lovell Telescope. Over 50 years later, it remains a productive radio telescope, now operated mostly as part of the MERLIN and European VLBI Network interferometric arrays of radio telescopes.

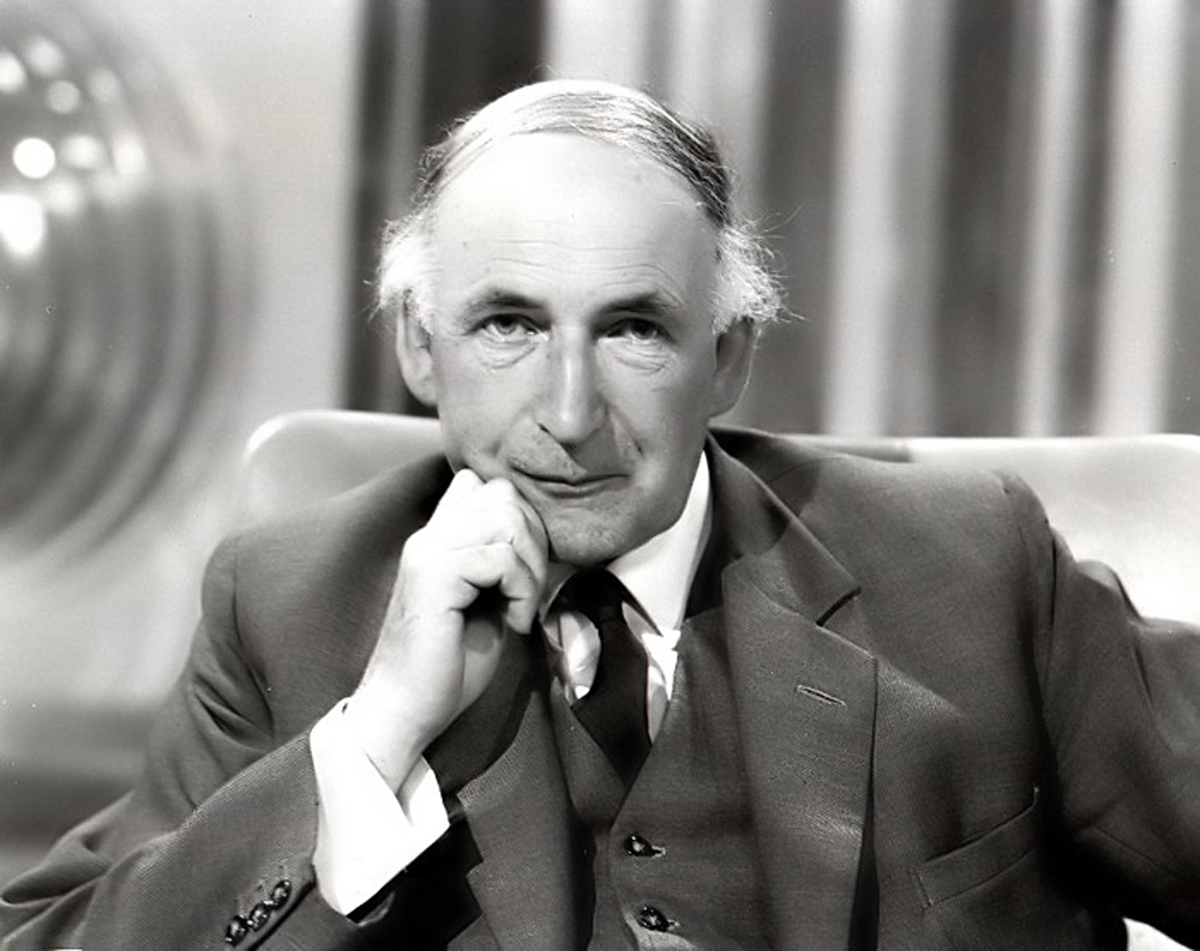
Bernard Lovell

In 2009, Lovell claimed he had been the subject of a Cold War assassination attempt during a 1963 visit to the Soviet Deep-Space Communication Centre (Eupatoria). He alleged that his hosts tried to kill him with a lethal radiation dose because he was head of the Jodrell Bank space telescope when it was also being used as part of an early warning system for Soviet nuclear attacks. Having fallen ill shortly after the visit and taken a long time to recover, he wrote a full account of the incident which, at his determination, was only published after his death.

=== Lectures ===
In 1958, Lovell was invited by the BBC to deliver the annual Reith Lectures, a series of six radio broadcasts called The Individual and the Universe, in which he examined the history of enquiry into the Solar System and the origin of the universe.

In 1959, he was invited to deliver the MacMillan Memorial Lecture to the Institution of Engineers and Shipbuilders in Scotland. He chose the subject "Radio Astronomy and the Structure of the Universe".

In 1965 he was invited to co-deliver the Royal Institution Christmas Lecture on Exploration of the Universe.

In 1975 he gave the presidential address (In the Centre of Immensities) to the British Association meeting in Guildford.

== Awards and honours ==
Lovell won numerous awards including:

- 1938 – Member of the Manchester Literary and Philosophical Society
- 1946 – Officer of the Order of the British Empire (OBE), for his work on H2S
- 1955 – Elected a Fellow of the Royal Society
- 1955 – Elected to the American Academy of Arts and Sciences
- 1960 – Royal Medal of the Royal Society
- 1961 – Knight Bachelor for contributions to the development of radio astronomy
- 1967 – Honorary Degree (Doctor of Science), University of Bath
- 1969 – Lorimer Medal of the Astronomical Society of Edinburgh
- 1969–71 – President of the Royal Astronomical Society
- 1974 – Elected to the American Philosophical Society
- 1980 – Benjamin Franklin Medal
- 1981 – Gold Medal of the Royal Astronomical Society
- 2009 – Dalton Medal of the Manchester Literary and Philosophical Society

Lovell was a member of the Royal Swedish Academy of Sciences.

Lovell has a secondary school named after him in Oldland Common, Bristol, which he officially opened. A building on the QinetiQ site in Malvern is also named after him, as was the fictional scientist Bernard Quatermass, the hero of several BBC Television science-fiction serials of the 1950s, whose first name was chosen in honour of Lovell.

== Personal life ==
In 1937, Lovell married Mary Joyce Chesterman (d. 1993) and they had two sons and three daughters.

Lovell played the organ at St Peter's Parish church in his home village of Swettenham, close to Jodrell Bank, and commissioned a Mander organ for the church.

In later life Lovell was physically very frail; he lived in quiet retirement in the countryside, surrounded by music, his books and a vast garden filled with trees he planted many decades before. Lovell died at home in Swettenham, Cheshire on 6 August 2012.

== Read also ==
- Lovell, Bernard (1967). Our Present Knowledge of the Universe. Manchester, UK: Manchester University Press. Bibcode:1967opku.book.....L.
- Lovell, Bernard (1990). Astronomer by Chance. New York, USA: Basic Books.
