= Break clause =

Term in a contract that allows early termination

A break clause is a term in a contract that allows early termination of the contract before the default end date. In accordance with English property law, such clauses are typical in tenancy agreements, so as to allow a tenancy to come to an end before the end date stated in the agreement. A break clause may be invoked by either the landlord or the tenant. The terms of the tenancy agreement are required to be fair to both the tenant and the landlord to comply with consumer protection law. Break clauses usually require some period of notice as outlined in the clause.

== Residential tenancies in the United Kingdom ==
In the United Kingdom, the legal effect of a break clause in a residential tenancy depends on the tenancy system applying in the relevant jurisdiction. Residential tenancy law differs between England, Wales, Scotland and Northern Ireland.

=== England ===
In England, break clauses have commonly been used in fixed-term assured shorthold tenancies. Government guidance states that a tenant is responsible for paying rent for the whole fixed-term tenancy unless there is a break clause in the tenancy agreement or the landlord agrees to end the tenancy early.

Shelter England describes a break clause as a clause which allows the tenant and landlord to give notice to end a fixed-term tenancy early. It states that there is no standard format for a break clause, and that the tenancy agreement should be checked to see when the clause can be used and how much notice must be given. Shelter also notes that some clauses may be used only on or after a certain date, while others may be exercisable only at a specific point in the tenancy.

Where there are joint tenants, all joint tenants generally need to agree before using a break clause, unless the tenancy agreement provides otherwise.

A landlord's use of a break clause does not by itself guarantee recovery of possession. Government guidance for landlords states that, where a tenancy agreement contains a break clause, the landlord may give notice after the break clause, but does not have a guaranteed right to possession during the first six months of the tenancy.

The role of break clauses in England is affected by reforms under the Renters' Rights Act. Government guidance states that, once the reforms are implemented, tenants will be able to end a tenancy by giving two months' notice, with the end date aligned with the end of a rent period.

=== Wales ===
In Wales, residential renting is governed by the Renting Homes (Wales) Act 2016, under which tenants are generally described as "contract-holders" and tenancy agreements as "occupation contracts". Section 189 of the Act provides that the date specified in a notice under a contract-holder's break clause in a fixed-term standard contract may not be less than four weeks after the day on which the notice is given.

The Welsh Government publishes prescribed forms for landlords using break clauses in fixed-term standard contracts, including forms for notices with two-month and six-month minimum notice periods and a form for withdrawal of a notice of termination under a landlord's break clause.

=== Scotland ===
In Scotland, most private residential tenancies created since December 2017 are private residential tenancies rather than fixed-term assured or short assured tenancies. Scottish Government guidance states that a tenant under a private residential tenancy must give the landlord at least 28 days' written notice to end the tenancy, unless the landlord agrees in writing to a shorter notice period. As a result, break clauses are less central to ordinary private residential renting in Scotland than in tenancy systems based on fixed terms.

=== Northern Ireland ===
In Northern Ireland, private tenancies are governed separately from the law in England, Wales and Scotland. NI Direct guidance states that a tenancy agreement should include how long the tenancy will last, and that a written notice to quit is required to end a tenancy except in the case of a fixed-term tenancy.

== See also ==
- Citizens Advice Bureau
- Consumer Rights Act 2015 (Parts 2 and 3)
- Unfair Contract Terms Act 1977
