= Twemlow =

Civil parish in Cheshire, England

Coordinates: 53.215084°N 2.328510°W

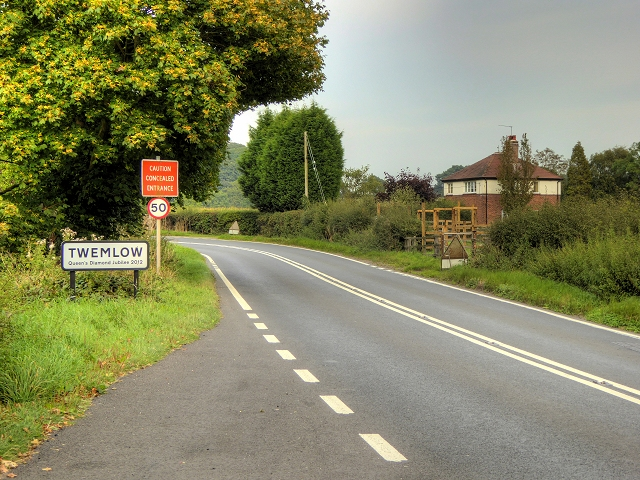
- Macclesfield Road approaching Twemlow Green

- Location within Cheshire
- Population: 192
- OS grid reference: SJ781687
- Civil parish: Twemlow
- Unitary authority: Cheshire East
- Ceremonial county: Cheshire
- Region: North West
- Country: England
- Sovereign state: United Kingdom
- Post town: Holmes Chapel
- Postcode district: CW4
- Dialling code: 01477
- Police: Cheshire
- Fire: Cheshire
- Ambulance: North West
- UK Parliament: Congleton

Twemlow is a civil parish, containing the village of Twemlow Green in the unitary authority of Cheshire East and the ceremonial county of Cheshire, England. According to the 2011 Official UK Census, the population of the entire civil parish was 192. Twemlow lies on the A535 road and the West Coast Mainline, which crosses the River Dane via the Grade-II-listed Twemlow Viaduct.

From the 16th to the 18th century, the Booth family were the major landowners.

Twemlow is divided by the Dane from the adjoining parishes of Holmes Chapel and Brereton to the south. The parish is also bounded by Goostrey to the north, Lower Withington and Swettenham to the east, and Cranage to the west. The Dane Valley Way long-distance footpath passes through the parish on its route from Buxton to Northwich.

== Twemlow viaduct ==
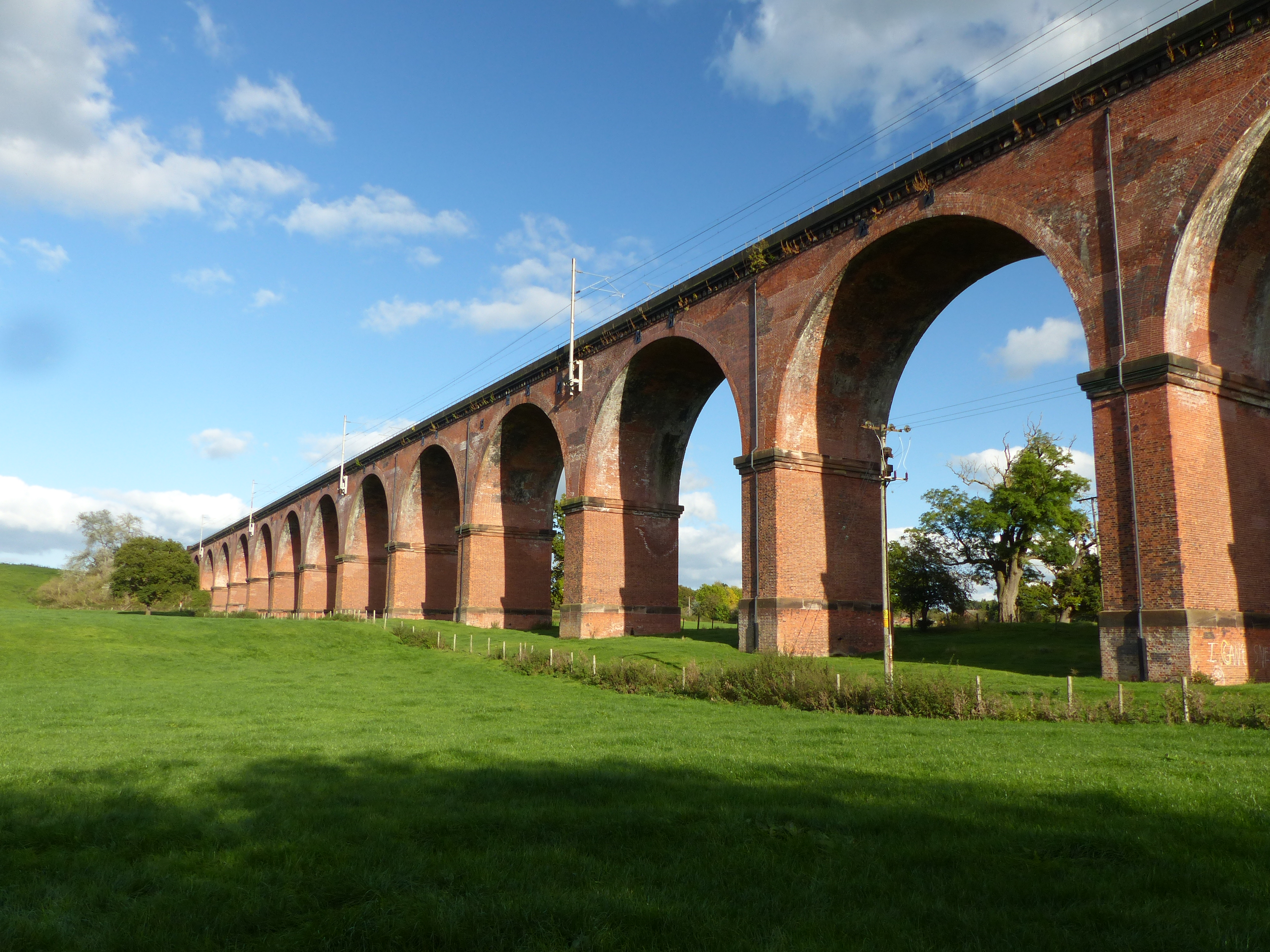
The Twemlow viaduct photographed in 2021.

Twemlow is home to the Grade-II-listed Twemlow viaduct, built in brick by George W. Buck, engineer to Manchester and Birmingham Railway Company, in 1841. It was built to allow the West Coast Mainline cross the River Dane.

The viaduct has attracted fans of the singer Harry Styles since it featured in a 2013 film about the rise of One Direction. The site is reputedly the site of the singer's first kiss. In 2024, Network Rail fenced off part of the structure and erected a specially constructed wall with blackboards for fans to inscribe their names, with the aim of preventing further damage after many fans inscribed their names on the structure.

== See also ==
- Listed buildings in Twemlow
