= Swettenham =

Village in Cheshire, England

Coordinates: 53.201452°N 2.299887°W

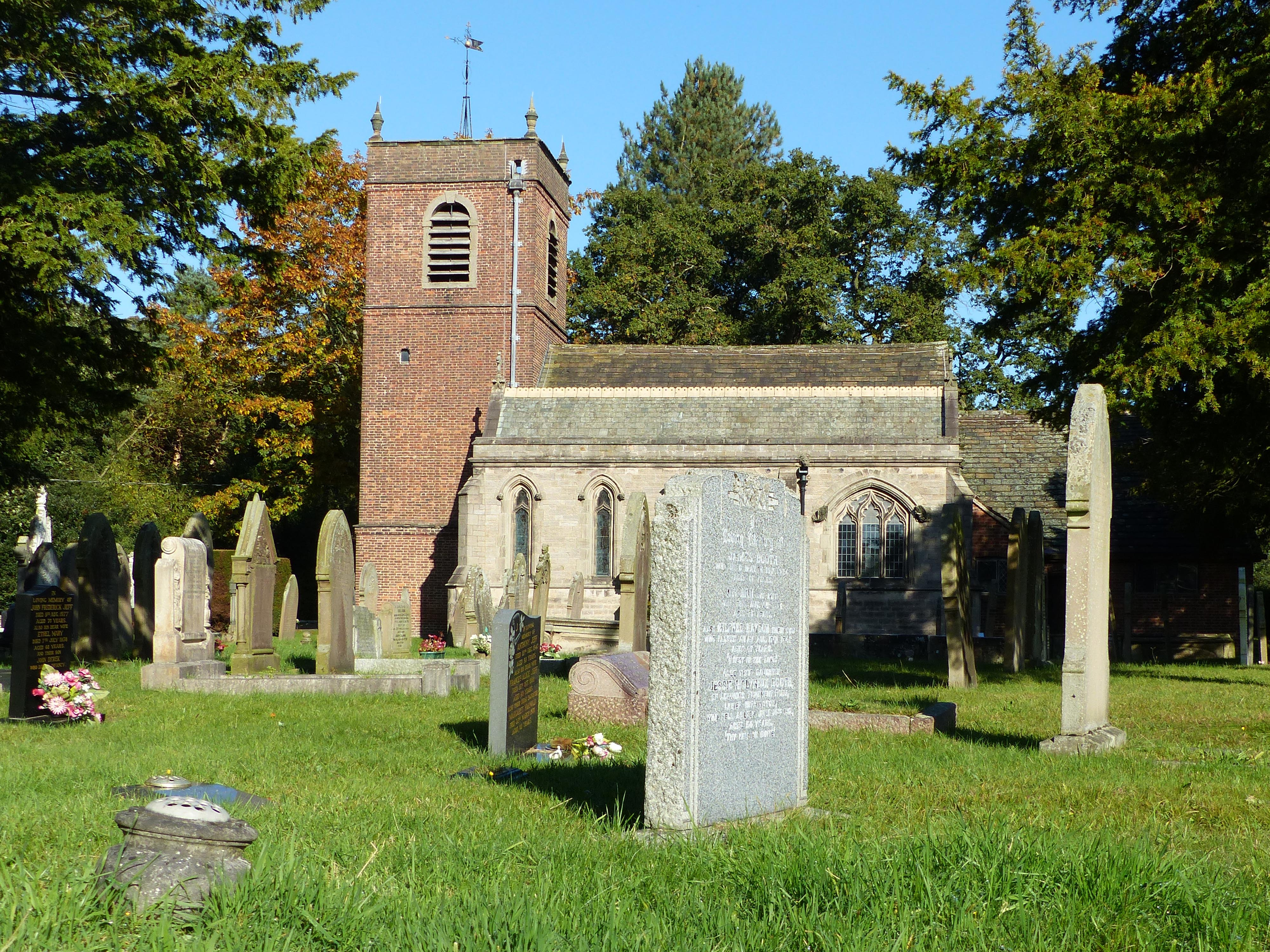
- St Peter's Church, Swettenham

- Location within Cheshire
- Population: 291 (2011)
- OS grid reference: SJ800671
- Unitary authority: Cheshire East
- Ceremonial county: Cheshire
- Region: North West
- Country: England
- Sovereign state: United Kingdom
- Post town: Congleton
- Postcode district: CW12
- Dialling code: 01477
- Police: Cheshire
- Fire: Cheshire
- Ambulance: North West
- UK Parliament: Congleton

Swettenham is a village and civil parish in the unitary authority of Cheshire East and the ceremonial county of Cheshire, England. According to the 2001 Official UK Census, the population of the entire civil parish was 248, increasing to 291 at the 2011 Census. The civil parish includes the hamlet of Kermincham.

The place-name 'Swettenham' is first attested in the Pipe Rolls of 1183, where it appears as Suetenhala. It appears as Swetenham in 1259 in the County Court, City Court and Eyre Rolls of Chester. The name means 'Sweta's homestead'.

Within the parish is the Swettenham Arms pub and restaurant, Kermincham Hall, Swettenham Meadows Nature Reserve (managed by Cheshire Wildlife Trust) and the Lovell Quinta Arboretum (managed by Tatton Garden Society since 2003). The arboretum was founded by astronomer Sir Bernard Lovell, who lived at Swettenham from 1948 until his death in 2012.

The parish is separated from the adjoining parish of Brereton by the River Dane to the south. The parish is bounded by Lower Withington to the north, Marton and Somerford Booths to the east, and Twemlow to the west. The Dane Valley Way long-distance footpath passes through the village on its route from Buxton to Northwich.

== St Peter's Church ==
The parish church of St Peter is recorded in the National Heritage List for England as a designated Grade II* listed building. It is an active Anglican parish church in the diocese of Chester. A Saxon cross, discovered during 19th-century excavations, is displayed in an alcove but the oldest surviving part of the church is the cruck-framed sanctuary, dating from approximately 1260. The nave was added in around 1500, and the church was encased in brick in 1722, at which time the brick tower was added.

== See also ==
- Listed buildings in Swettenham
