= St Luke's Church, Goostrey =

Anglican parish church in England

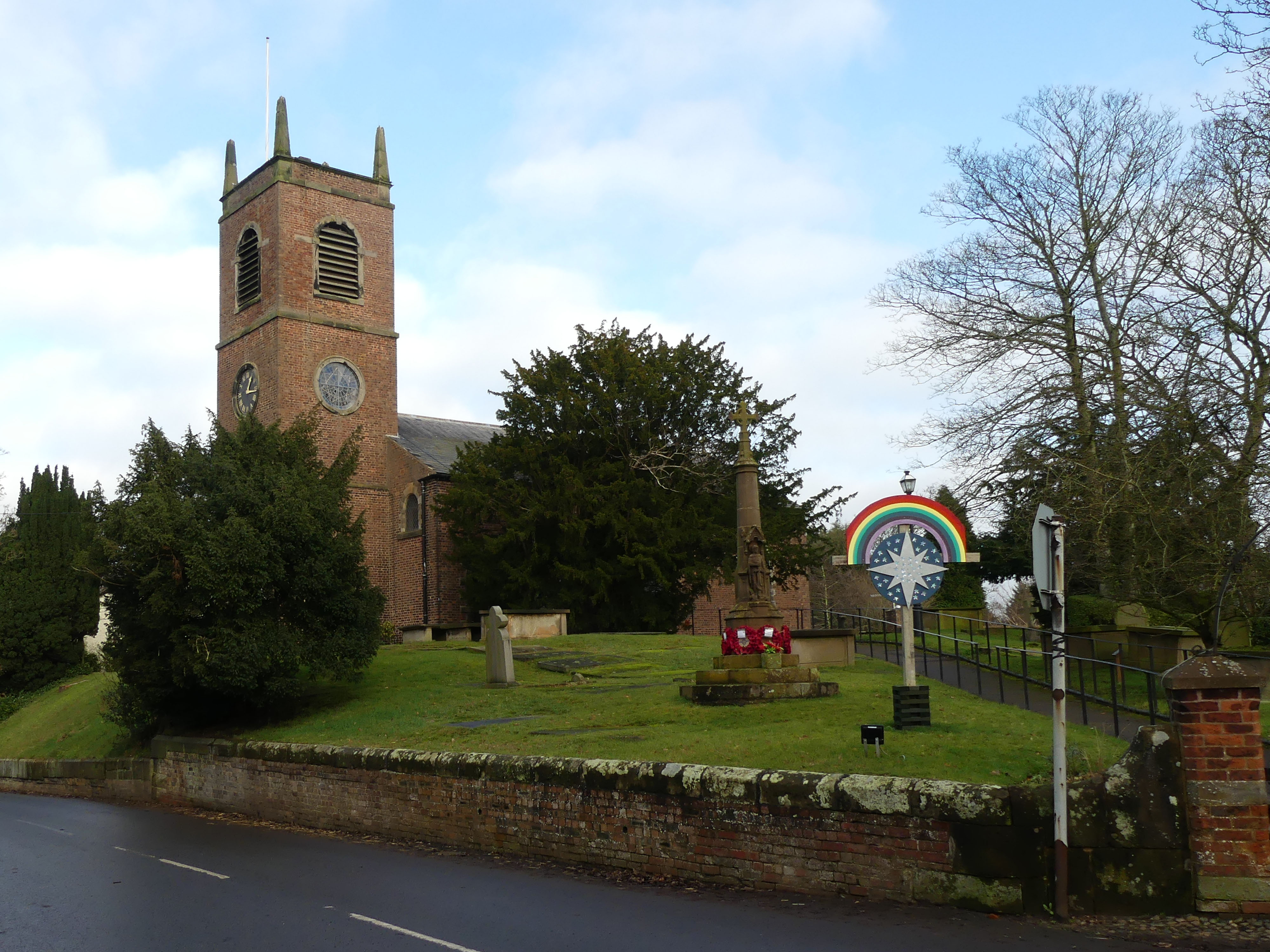
- St Luke's Church, Goostrey, from the south
- St Luke's Church, Goostrey
- 53.2268°N 2.3320°W
- OS grid reference: SJ 779 700
- Location: Goostrey, Cheshire
- Country: England
- Denomination: Church of England
- Website: St Luke's Goostrey

History
- Status: Parish church
- Dedication: St Luke

Architecture
- Functional status: Active
- Heritage designation: Grade II*
- Designated: 14 February 1967
- Architectural type: Church
- Style: Neoclassical
- Completed: 1796
- Construction cost: £1,700 (equivalent to £170,000 in 2025)

Administration
- Province: York
- Diocese: Chester
- Archdeaconry: Macclesfield
- Deanery: Congleton
- Parish: Goostrey

Clergy
- Vicar: Revd Canon Christine Broad

St Luke's Church is in the village of Goostrey, Cheshire, England. It is an active Church of England parish church in the Diocese of Chester, the archdeaconry of Macclesfield and the deanery of Congleton, in a combined benefice with St Peter, Swettenham.

The church is recorded in the National Heritage List for England as a designated grade II*-listed building.

== History ==
Goostrey is first mentioned in the Domesday Book and, by 1244, was a chapelry of the ancient parish of Sandbach in the diocese of Lichfield.

In the 16th century the Booth baronets became established as the local landowners and William Booth (1526–1591), after the accession of Elizabeth I, rebuilt Goostrey Chapel in the Tudor architectural style with a Lady chapel in the south aisle for the Booths of Twemlow. In 1617, the chapel was described as timber-framed with a nave, chancel and the "Booth Chapel". In that year, a dispute arose about "patronage". This was resolved in favour of John Booth, whose family funded the chapel's upkeep. In 1667, an additional side chapel to the south aisle was constructed for the previously absentee lord of Twemlow's other moiety Edmund Jodrell of Yeardsley in Whaley Bridge, this being enlarged in 1711.

Goostrey's old church was demolished by Charles Everard Booth, who died in 1792, and the present church built between 1792 and 1796.

== Parish of Goostrey ==
The ecclesiastical parish of Goostrey includes not only the civil parish created in 1936, but also the hamlet of Twemlow, named after the burial mounds or 'lows' found in this part of Cheshire, indicating human settlement over four thousand years ago.

The first documented mention of Goostrey is in the Domesday Book (1086), when most of the parish was held by William fitz Nigel, baron of Halton, and by Hugh de La Mare, lord of Leigh, another follower of Hugh d'Avranches, 1st Earl of Chester. They granted considerable land at Goostrey to endow the new Abbey of St Werburgh in Chester, and further land in the area was later given for endowing the Vale Royal Abbey, near Northwich.

Its medieval history is recorded in grants and agreements regulating matters between the Abbot and Canons of St Werburgh, Chester, and their local tenants. Occasionally these documents provide an insight into the personal lives of the period. For example, in 1286 Hamond Meulan broke into the chapel at Goostrey and took away all the ornaments; or when five brothers of William Eaton of Blackden were slain together and buried in the chapelyard in 1385.

== St Luke's Church ==
Originally built before 1220 as a chapel-of-ease to its mother parish church of St Mary, Sandbach in 1350 the vicar of Sandbach granted permission to hold funerals at Goostrey. Goostrey parishioners would previously have had to make a five-mile (8 km) journey to Sandbach, crossing the River Dane and River Croco.

Goostrey Chapel was timber-framed, as Marton church still is today, but all that remains from the Middle Ages is the 15th-century font.

St Luke's ring of six bells includes three "old" and three "modern", ranging in date from the 17th to 20th centuries. Three of the old bells rung in the ancient chapel; the oldest cast in 1606 for John Booth, the next in 1705 then costing £5, and the third by Daniel Cotton, who married Anne Booth in 1707. Of the latter three, two were cast by George Mears at the Whitechapel Bell Foundry in 1869 and the third by James Barwell of Birmingham, dated 1912, given by Anna Maria Toler in memory of Mrs Thomas Hilditch.

The pipe organ at St Luke's was built in 1876 by Wadsworth. Some of the Communion plates are 18th-century, and in 1719 a silver paten plate was given by Miss Dorothy Jodrell, commissioned from Samuel Wastell of London in 1715. A chalice and flagon, towards which Randle Armstrong of Marton Hall donated £20 in 1759, were made by London silversmith, Fuller White. There is a modern paten, dated 1902, made in London, and there is a modern chalice given in memory of Sarah Elizabeth Knowles, made in Sheffield and dated 1931.

== Parish records ==
The parish registers, which are well preserved, date back to 1561 and include the burial in 1591 of William Booth, lord of the manor of Twemlow. They contain other interesting notes, such as one in 1661 with the word 'scould' written in a different ink beside Marie Worthington, after the perpetual curate Robert Worthington's wife died. Another note among the next year's burials tells that Mr Whishall 'married five wives,' and later, in 1674, when James Dean married Margaret Hall, we read that she was his third wife 'all within the year'. At the back of the volume, among a list of notices relating to collections made in the chapelry, are documented donations sent to towns like Ripon in Yorkshire or Bridgnorth in Shropshire, as well as one contribution sent to Hugh Evans 'having his house and his household goods burnt in the county of Salop'. The registers also document how the parishioners approved when the lesser-spotted Revd George Eccles was replaced by Henry Newcome as minister on 7 October 1648, and it seems that even into the 18th century the locals had some sway in which clergyman was presented to the living of Goostrey, even though the final decision must have rested then as now with the vicar of St Mary's, Sandbach. Newcome was a strict Puritan, and forbade two of the most prominent gentry, Captain John Baskervyle (1599–1662) and Mr John Kinsey (1585–1664), from celebrating Holy Communion for their frequent drinking. He left after eighteen months, being presented by Colonel Henry Mainwaring as rector of St James' Church, Gawsworth.

The churchwarden's accounts are preserved from 1638 and explain the economics of parish life in olden times. For example, in 1661, the font could be releaded for thirteen shillings, or a turret clock bought for two pounds three shillings and nine pence in 1658. Some things seem very cheap, as when the royal arms were painted and erected for two pounds three shillings and eight pence, and others very expensive, such as the purchase of copies of the Book of Common Prayer in 1662 at a cost of twelve shillings, when a labourer's weekly wage would not be much more than half a crown. Sometimes information is scarce, as when the church was renovated in 1711 at a cost of forty six pounds. Other account examples include 5,000 bricks for two pounds five shillings in 1750.

== Construction ==
Charles Everard Booth, who inherited Twemlow Hall in 1786 from the last male-line Booth lord of the manor, was instrumental in building a new church but died in 1792. Work commenced to the design of the village bricksetter, at a cost of £1,700, as the old timber-framed church had fallen into disrepair and was very cold. No doubt the continual alterations when new aisles were added to accommodate competing local gentry had made a thorough rebuilding necessary, but the 18th century was no respecter of ancient buildings. However, they did keep the old yew tree.

In 1876 St Luke's Church was renovated and its interior refurbished. The pulpit, lectern and sanctuary-panelling were installed and the organ built, with a new console in 1947 when the pipes were moved to the gallery. In 1961 a new altar was consecrated and other furniture for the chancel was rearranged to give more space between the choir pews.

The stained glass, which may aptly be called post-Raphaelite, dates from about 1876: the east window being given in memory of Egerton Leigh, the second seated at Jodrell Hall, and the south west window being in memory of the young wife of William Armitstead, vicar of Goostrey from 1862 to 1907, having married Mary Susan née Currie in 1865 who died in 1868.

== Churchyard ==
There are two listed monuments in St Luke's churchyard: a sundial dating from 1798 with a gnomon dated 1999, and a table tomb by the east end of the church. There is also a war memorial near the church gate. The churchyard also contains the war grave of a Canadian soldier from World War I.

== Schools ==
Across from St Luke's Church is Goostrey Primary School. The earliest reference to a school at Goostrey is in 1640 when it was repaired. It was then next to the churchyard north wall where the Old Vicarage now stands, in a house which was also used as the manorial courtroom; this appears to have been pulled down in 1703. It may be then that the pupils moved across to the Old School House, which remains one of the oldest buildings in the village.

In 1856 the main part of the present buildings were erected when the old days of a schoolmaster also serving as parish clerk came to an end. Goostrey's last schoolmaster, Jonathan Harding (1781–1862), was in office for fifty two years and buried by the west end of the church. In 1977 a new infant department across the main road was built, severing the connection between church and school.

== People of Goostrey ==
Memorials in St Luke's Church remember many notable Goostrey gentry families.

In the south aisle are memorials to the Booth family who lived at Twemlow Hall. The Booths originated from Barton near Manchester and became a family of note in the North West by the 15th century. They acquired Dunham Massey through Sir Robert Booth's marriage with heiress Dulcia Venables, before a Booth cadet branch became seated at Twemlow in the early 16th century by marriage with a Knutsford heiress, whilst her sister married Roger Jodrell of Yeardsley, who obtained the other part of the manor.

Elizabeth Jodrell, daughter and co-heiress of Francis Jodrell, in 1778 married Egerton Leigh (1752–1833) of West Hall, High Legh, and in 1863 their grandson Egerton Leigh bought the other 900 acres (3.6 km^{2}) of Twemlow Hall from the Booths. The Leigh family sold most of their Jodrell and surrounding estates in 1924.

John Hulse, of nearby Elworth, was perpetual curate of Goostrey from 1735 to 1754 and left money to Cambridge University to found a professorial chair, now the Norris–Hulse Professor of Divinity.

Thomas Kinsey (1735–1814), who descended from John Kinsey (who married firstly Anne Booth in 1603), was the last male representative of the Kinseys seated at Blackden Hall after marrying a Goostrey heiress in 1380.

Lawrence Armitstead (1790–1874), whose memorial is on the north wall, purchased The Hermitage in Holmes Chapel and Cranage Hall in 1829. Originally from Horton-in-Ribblesdale in the mid-18th century, the Armitsteads produced four vicars of Goostrey, with three successively from 1859 to 1923, including John Armitstead.

The Baskervyles whose memorials are in the north east corner of the chancel were squires of nearby Withington Hall from 1266 until 1954 when Lieutenant-Colonel John Baskerville-Glegg was buried at the east end of the church with his ancestors.

Today most land in Goostrey is owned by farming families, though at the north east corner of the parish, Manchester University owns land where the Jodrell Bank Observatory radio telescope overlooks a collection of neolithic barrows.

== See also ==
- Grade II* listed buildings in Cheshire East
- Listed buildings in Goostrey
