= Holmes Chapel railway station =

Railway station in Cheshire, England

Coordinates: 53.199°N 2.351°W

Holmes Chapel
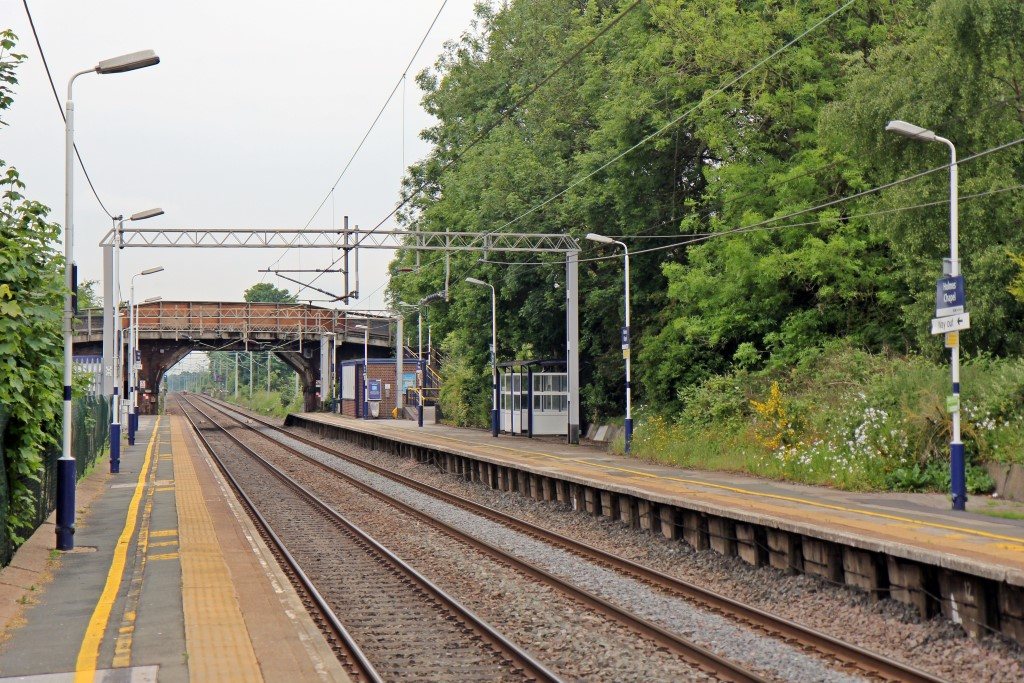
- Holmes Chapel railway station in 2015

General information
- Location: Holmes Chapel, Cheshire East; England
- Grid reference: SJ766669
- Manager: Northern Trains
- Platforms: 2

Other information
- Station code: HCH
- Classification: DfT category E

History
- Opened: 10 May 1842

Passengers
- 2021/22: ▲0.143 million
- 2022/23: ▲0.176 million
- 2023/24: ▲0.202 million
- 2024/25: ▲0.244 million
- 2025/26: ▲0.268 million
Location
Notes
- Passenger statistics from the Office of Rail and Road

Holmes Chapel railway station serves the village of Holmes Chapel in Cheshire, England. It is located 8½ miles (14 km) north-east of Crewe on the Crewe to Manchester Line.

== History ==
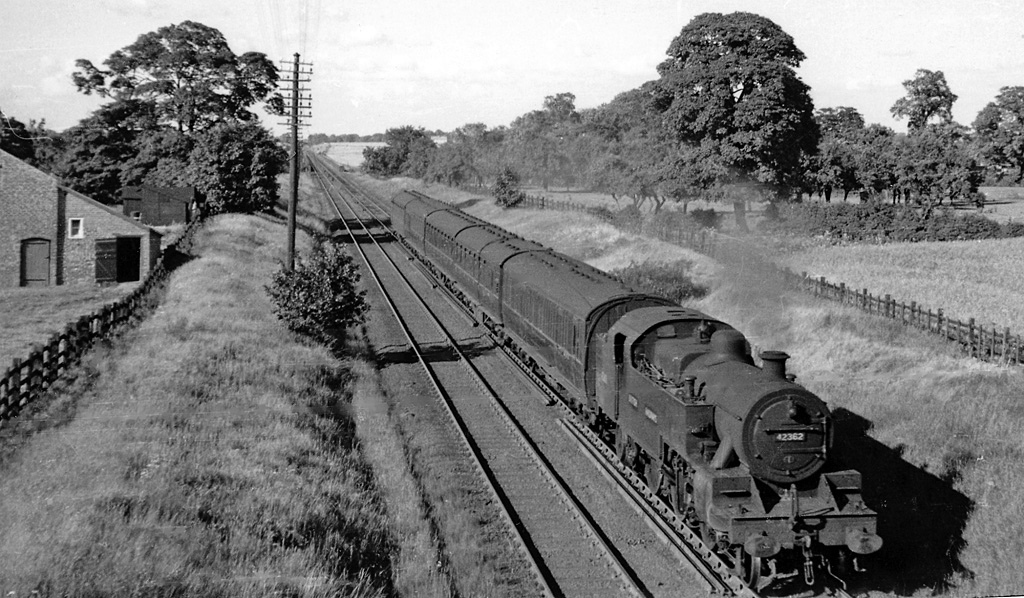
Up local train approaching the station in 1951

Holmes Chapel railway station was opened on 10 May 1842.

On 15 July the station was temporarily renamed to It's Coming Holmes Chapel ahead of England's 2026 world cup semi final match against Argentina that day.

=== Accidents and incidents ===
On 14 September 1941, two passenger trains collided near the station.

== Facilities ==
The station has a ticket office on the southbound platform, which is staffed six days a week on a part-time basis (Monday - Friday 06:35 - 13:05, Saturday 07:35 - 13:55); outside of these hours, tickets must be bought in advance, on-line or on the train. Train running information is offered via digital displays, timetable posters and a customer help point on platform 1.

There are two waiting shelters on the northbound platform and a waiting room in the main building; canopies are also provided for passengers for use when the booking office is closed. Step-free access is available to both platforms.

There is a lending library in the station waiting room.

=== Artwork ===
In 2025, a mural of former Holmes Chapel resident Harry Styles was unveiled at the station. According to BBC News, around 10,000 of the singer's fans had visited the village since 2023.

== Services ==
During the daytime on Mondays to Saturdays, there are two trains per hour in each direction between Crewe and Manchester Piccadilly:

- One via Stockport, calling at all intermediate stations
- One along the Styal line via Manchester Airport, omitting some stops.

On evenings, there is an hourly service in each direction between Crewe and Manchester Piccadilly, via Stockport.

On Sundays there is a service of one train every two hours between Manchester Piccadilly, Stockport and Crewe.

From May 2027, London Northwestern Railway plan to launch a new Birmingham New Street to Manchester Airport service which will call at Holmes Chapel.

Currently, all stopping services are operated by Northern Trains.

Preceding station	National Rail	Following station
Sandbach	Northern Trains Crewe-Manchester Line	Goostrey
Sandbach	Northern Trains Crewe-Manchester Line	Alderley Edge
