= Blackden Manor =

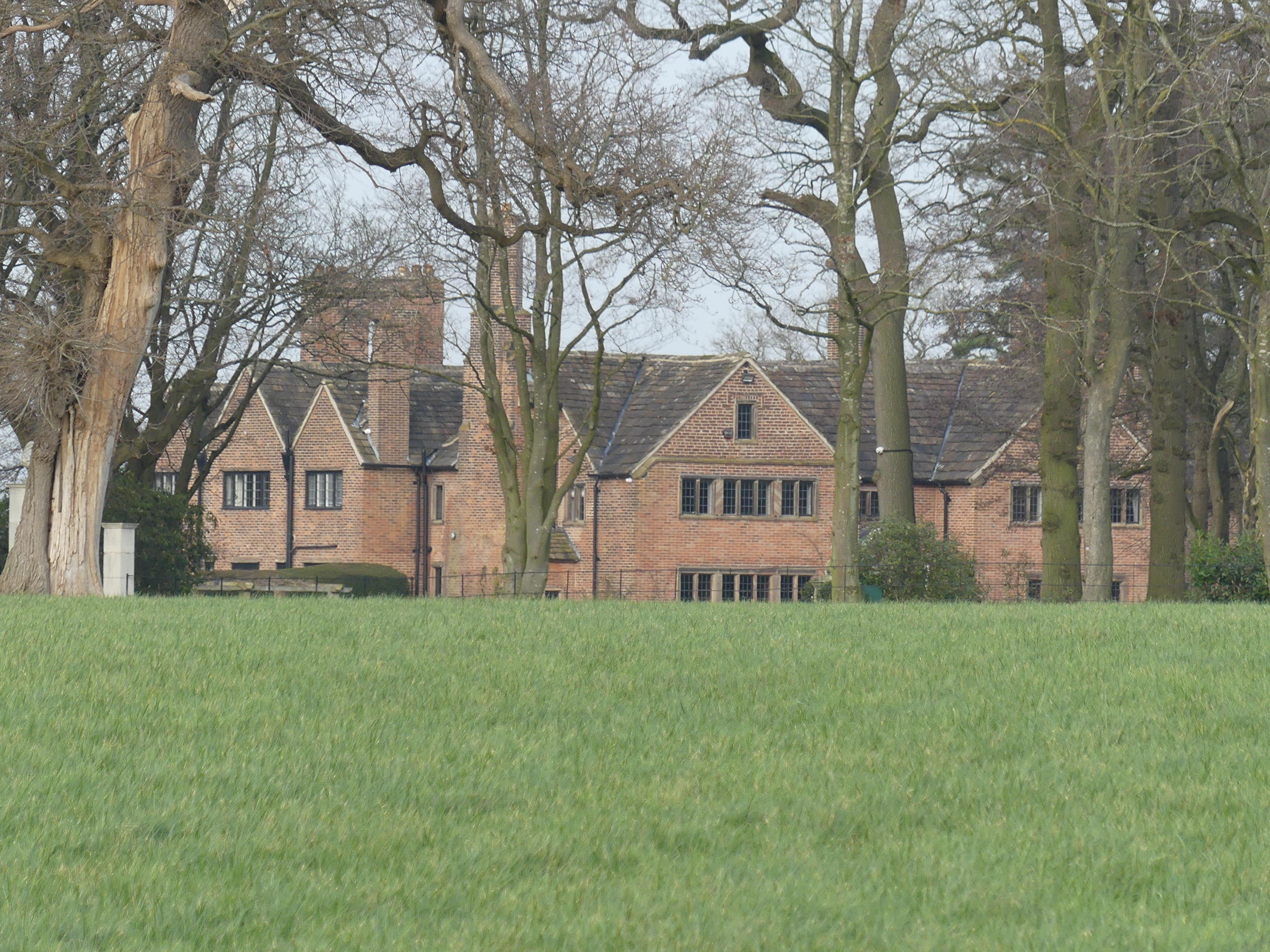
- Distant view of Blackden Manor from the south

- Blackden Manor in Cheshire
- 53.22358°N 2.32264°W
- Location: Goostrey, Cheshire East

History
- Built: Late 16th century

Listed Building – Grade II
- Designated: 14 February 1967
- Reference no.: 1231265

Blackden Manor is a former manor house to the southeast of the village of Goostrey, Cheshire, England. It is a timber-framed building that was re-cased in brick in the late 19th century. The house was restored in 1920 by the architect James Henry Sellers. He added new wings to the rear of the house, forming a courtyard. The house is constructed in sandstone with a slate roof; it has two storeys and an attic. The house is recorded in the National Heritage List for England, as a designated Grade II listed building. Also listed at Grade II is a two-storey brick farm building to the southeast of the house, dating from 1709.

== See also ==
- Listed buildings in Goostrey
