= Listed buildings in Goostrey =

Goostrey is a civil parish in Cheshire East, England. It contains 19 buildings that are recorded in the National Heritage List for England as designated listed buildings. Of these, one is listed at Grade I, the highest grade, three are listed at Grade II*, the middle grade, and the others are at Grade II. Apart from the village of Goostrey, the parish is mainly rural. It contains the Jodrell Bank Observatory, with its Grade I listed Lovell Telescope and its control building. In the village, the listed buildings include the church and associated structures, the former schoolmaster's house, and a row of cottages. Outside the village they include country houses, farmhouses, and farm buildings, some of which date back to the 16th century and are timber-framed.

== Key ==
Grade	Criteria
I	Buildings of exceptional interest, sometimes considered to be internationally important
II*	Particularly important buildings of more than special interest
II	Buildings of national importance and special interest

== Buildings ==
Name and location	Photograph	Date	Notes	Grade
Toad Hall and Old Medicine House; 53.23168°N 2.31762°W		16th century or earlier	Toad Hall is partly timber-framed with brick nogging and partly in brick, and has a corrugated iron roof. It is in two storeys with a loft, and has a front of four bays. The windows are casements. Inside are three upper crucks. The Old Medicine house dates from about 1600 and was moved here in 1970 from Wrinehill in Staffordshire. It is also timber-framed, it has a tiled roof, is in two storeys, has a three-bay front, and a rear wing of one bay, giving it a T-shaped plan. It is joined to Toad Hall by a brick link.	II
Blackden Hall; 53.23005°N 2.32060°W		Late 16th century	A farmhouse, partly timber framed with plastered infill on a plinth, and partly in brick. It has a slate roof, is in two storeys with an attic, and has a three-bay gabled front with finials. The upper floor of the centre bay and the gables are jettied. The windows are mullioned. There is an added wing giving the building an L-shaped plan.	II*
Crook Hall; 53.24458°N 2.32311°W		Late 16th century	A brick farmhouse with a stone slate roof. It is in two storeys with an attic, and has a front of five bays and three gables, and sides of three bays. The gables have bargeboards and finials, and the windows are casements. There is timber-framing in an internal wall.	II*
Blackden Manor; 53.22358°N 2.32264°W		c. 1597	This is a former manor house. It is basically timber-framed, and was re-cased in brick in the 19th century. The house was restored in 1920 by J. H. Sellers, who added new wings to the rear forming a courtyard. The added wings are in sandstone, and the house has a slate roof. It is in two storeys with an attic, and the windows are mullioned.	II
Brookbank Farmhouse; 53.23431°N 2.31851°W	—	Early 17th century	A brick farmhouse with a slate roof. It is in two storeys with an attic, and has a three-bay front. On the front is a tall staircase window, and there are the remains of a sandstone plinth. To the left is a lean-to extension. The windows are casements, and there are timbers in the internal walls of the attic.	II
Old Schoolhouse; 53.22657°N 2.33283°W		Early 17th century	Originally the schoolmaster's house, it has been converted into a private house. It is basically timber-framed with a roof partly in stone slate and partly in tiles. The house has a single storey with an attic, and a three-bay front. The windows are casements, those in the upper floor being in half-dormers. There are timbers in the internal walls.	II
Winterbottom Farmhouse; 53.23694°N 2.34643°W		1670	This originated as a gamekeeper's cottage, and was later converted into a farmhouse. It is timber-framed with brick nogging and some brickwork, and has a slate roof. The house is in two storeys with an attic, and has a three-bay front. At the front is a projecting timber-framed porch. The windows are casements, the window in the attic being in a dormer.	II
Barnshaw Hall; 53.24253°N 2.33151°W		Late 17th century	There have been later alterations and additions to this brick farmhouse with a tiled roof. There are two storeys with an attic, and the house has an asymmetrical plan. At the front are four bays, and there is a gable with a bargeboard over the central two bays. The east bay is set back. The windows are casements, and there are timbers in the internal walls.	II
Brookside Farmhouse; 53.22930°N 2.33150°W		Late 17th century	The farmhouse has been converted into a private house. It is in brick with a stone slab roof. The house has two storeys with an attic, and a four-bay front. The windows are casements.	II
Church Cottages; 53.22613°N 2.33112°W		Late 17th century	A row of four timber-framed cottages with brick nogging and some brickwork, and with roofs of cement-slate. They are in two storeys and have a front of five bays. The end gables are rebuilt in brick, and at the left end is a single storey extension. The windows are casements. Inside is an inglenook.	II
Farm building, Crook Hall; 53.24460°N 2.32312°W	—	Late 17th century	The farm building is in brick with a slate roof. It is in two storeys, and has a front of seven bays. It contains hopper-light windows and square pitch holes, and in the west gable are exposed timbers.	II
Barn, Millbank Farm; 53.23187°N 2.34077°W	—	Late 17th century	The barn was extended in the 19th century. The original part is timber-framed with brick nogging on a high brick plinth, and has a slate roof. It has a front of three bays, and contains hopper-light windows and square pitch holes. The extension is also timber-framed, is in two storeys, and has a tiled roof with clay ridge tiles.	II
Swanwick Hall; 53.23087°N 2.34991°W		Late 17th century	A brick farmhouse with roofs of slate and tiles. It is in two storeys, and has a front of three bays, with a later bay added to the north. On the front is a gabled porch and a door with a Tudor arched lintel. The windows are casements, and there are timbers in the internal walls of the attic.	II
Farm building, Blackden Manor; 53.22324°N 2.32225°W	—	1709	The farm building is in brick with a stone slab roof. It is in two storeys, and extends for five bays. Its features include half-heck doors, hopper-light windows, square pitch holes, ventilation holes, and external stone steps.	II
Table tomb 53.22688°N 2.33170°W		c. 1765	The sandstone table tomb is in the churchyard of St Luke's Church. The base and corner stones have ogee moulding, and the corner stones are decorated with sun motifs. There are panels on the sides, and the top slab is convex.	II
St Luke's Church; 53.22681°N 2.33195°W		1792–96	The church was built to replace an earlier timber-framed church. It is constructed in brick with stone dressings and a slate roof. The church consists of a nave, a small chancel with a polygonal apse, a northwest vestry, and a west tower. The windows and bell openings have semicircular heads. The tower has a clock face on one side with circular openings on the other sides, a plain parapet, and corner pinnacles.	II*
Sundial; 53.22671°N 2.33180°W		1798	The sundial is in the churchyard of St Luke's Church. It is in sandstone and vase-shaped, with an octagonal pedestal standing on a square base. The cap has ogee moulding and a bronze plate with Roman numerals.	II
Lovell Telescope; 53.23651°N 2.30870°W		1952–57	A radio telescope at Jodrell Bank Observatory designed by Bernard Lovell with Charles Husband as engineer. When opened it was the largest steerable dish radio telescope in the world. It has a parabolic dish 250 feet (76 m) in diameter carried on a steel lattice frame 180 feet (55 m) high, and carried on a circular railway track with a diameter of 353 feet (108 m).	I
Control Building; 53.23610°N 2.30655°W		1954–55	The Control Building at Jodrell Bank Observatory was designed for Bernard Lovell for scientific research. It is in brick and concrete, and has a linear rectangular plan. Most of the building is in a single storey, with a two-storey central block and additions on the roof.	II

== See also ==
- Listed buildings in Allostock
- Listed buildings in Cranage
- Listed buildings in Lower Withington
- Listed buildings in Peover Superior
- Listed buildings in Twemlow
