= Goostrey Community Primary School =

Location
- Main Road; Goostrey, Cheshire, CW4 8PE; England
- Coordinates: 53.227°N 2.335°W

Information
- Type: Community primary school
- Motto: Learning and Achieving Together
- Local authority: Cheshire East Council
- Department for Education URN: 111171 Tables
- Ofsted: Reports
- Head teacher: Lyndsey Atkins
- Gender: Mixed
- Age range: 4–11
- Enrolment: 212
- Capacity: 210
- Website: www.goostrey.cheshire.sch.uk

Goostrey Community Primary School is a 4–11 mixed community primary school in Goostrey, Cheshire, England.

Across from St Luke's Church is Goostrey Primary School which was originally a Church of England school.

The earliest reference to a school in the church records is in 1640 when it was repaired. It was then next to the north wall of the churchyard where the old vicarage now stands, in a house which was also used as the court house for Goostrey Manor. This appears to have been pulled down in 1703. It may be then that the pupils moved across to the old school house, which is one of the oldest buildings in the village.

In 1856 the main part of the present buildings were erected when the old days of a schoolmaster who was also the parish clerk came to an end. The last of these schoolmasters, Jonathon Harding, is buried by the west end of the church; he had held his office for fifty six years. Another chapter was opened in 1977, with the building of a new infants' department across the main road. With this the old connection of church and school has been severed.
