= Goostrey railway station =

Railway station in Cheshire, England

Coordinates: 53.223°N 2.326°W

Goostrey
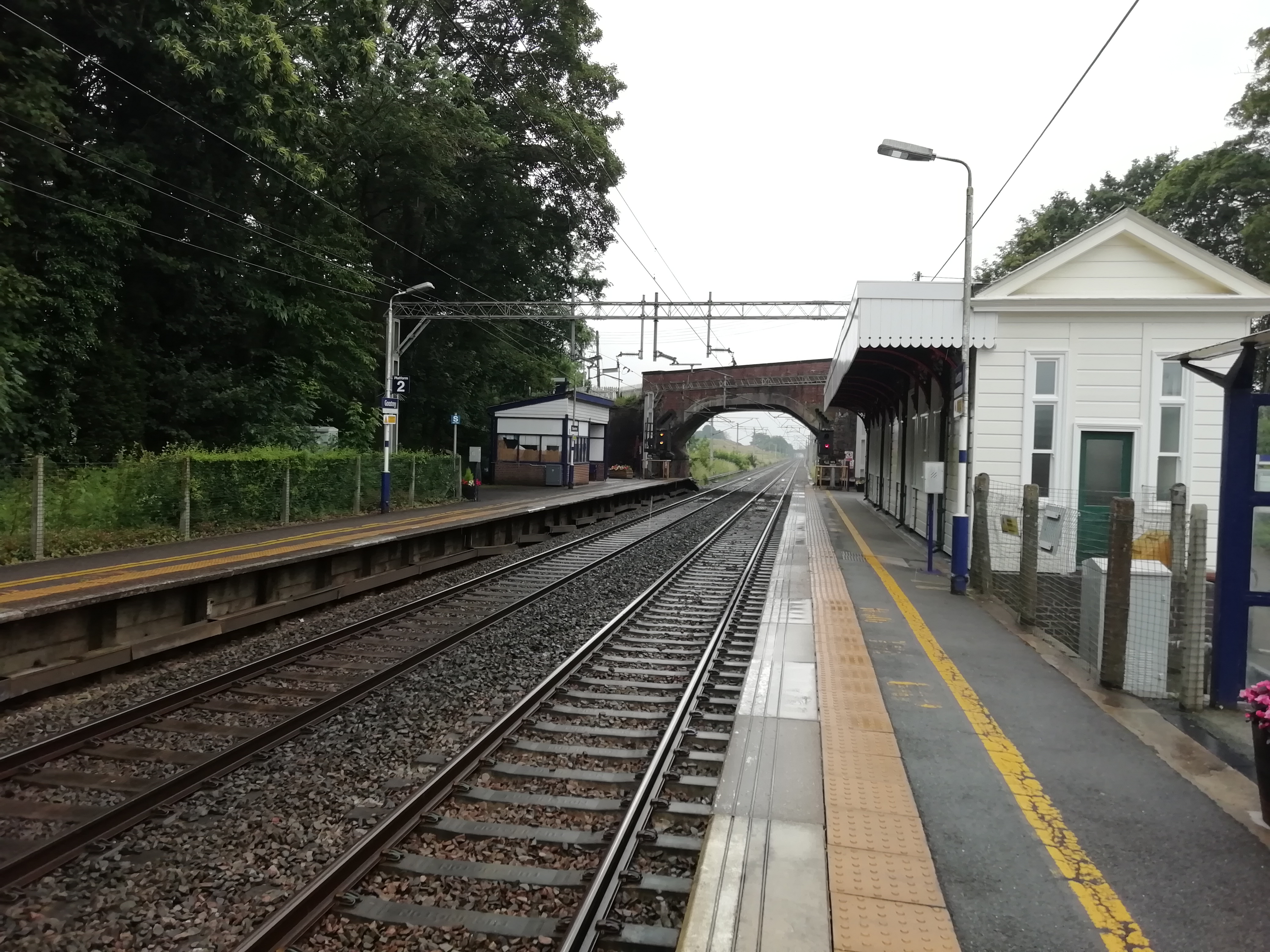

General information
- Location: Goostrey, Cheshire East; England
- Grid reference: SJ783695
- Manager: Northern Trains
- Platforms: 2

Other information
- Station code: GTR
- Classification: DfT category F2

History
- Opened: 1 September 1891

Passengers
- 2021/22: ▲24,182
- 2022/23: ▲32,370
- 2023/24: ▲35,984
- 2024/25: ▲39,526
- 2025/26: ▲44,348
Location
Notes
- Passenger statistics from the Office of Rail and Road

Goostrey railway station serves the village of Goostrey in Cheshire, England. The station is located 10½ miles (16 km) north-east of Crewe, on the Crewe to Manchester Line.

== History ==
The line was built by the Manchester and Birmingham Railway Company and was completed on 10 August 1842. Goostrey station was added by the London & North Western Railway, opening on 1 September 1891.

A photo of a keystone on the platform, at the foot of a mast, showed the MBR coat of arms and an inscription, MBR 1844 G. W. Buck Engineer. In 1958, it had been removed from the Manchester side of the road bridge at the station, when it was rebuilt to provide clearance for the electric wires; the keystone on the Crewe side showed W. Baker as engineer, but was broken when it was removed.

== Service ==
There is an hourly service between Manchester Piccadilly, Stockport and Crewe Monday - Saturday.

On Sundays there is a service of 1 train every two hours between Manchester Piccadilly, Stockport and Crewe.

All services are operated by Northern Trains.

Preceding station	National Rail	Following station
Holmes Chapel	Northern Crewe-Manchester Line	Chelford

== Friends of Goostrey Station ==
A Friends Group was founded on 1 May 2012.
