= Blackden Hall =

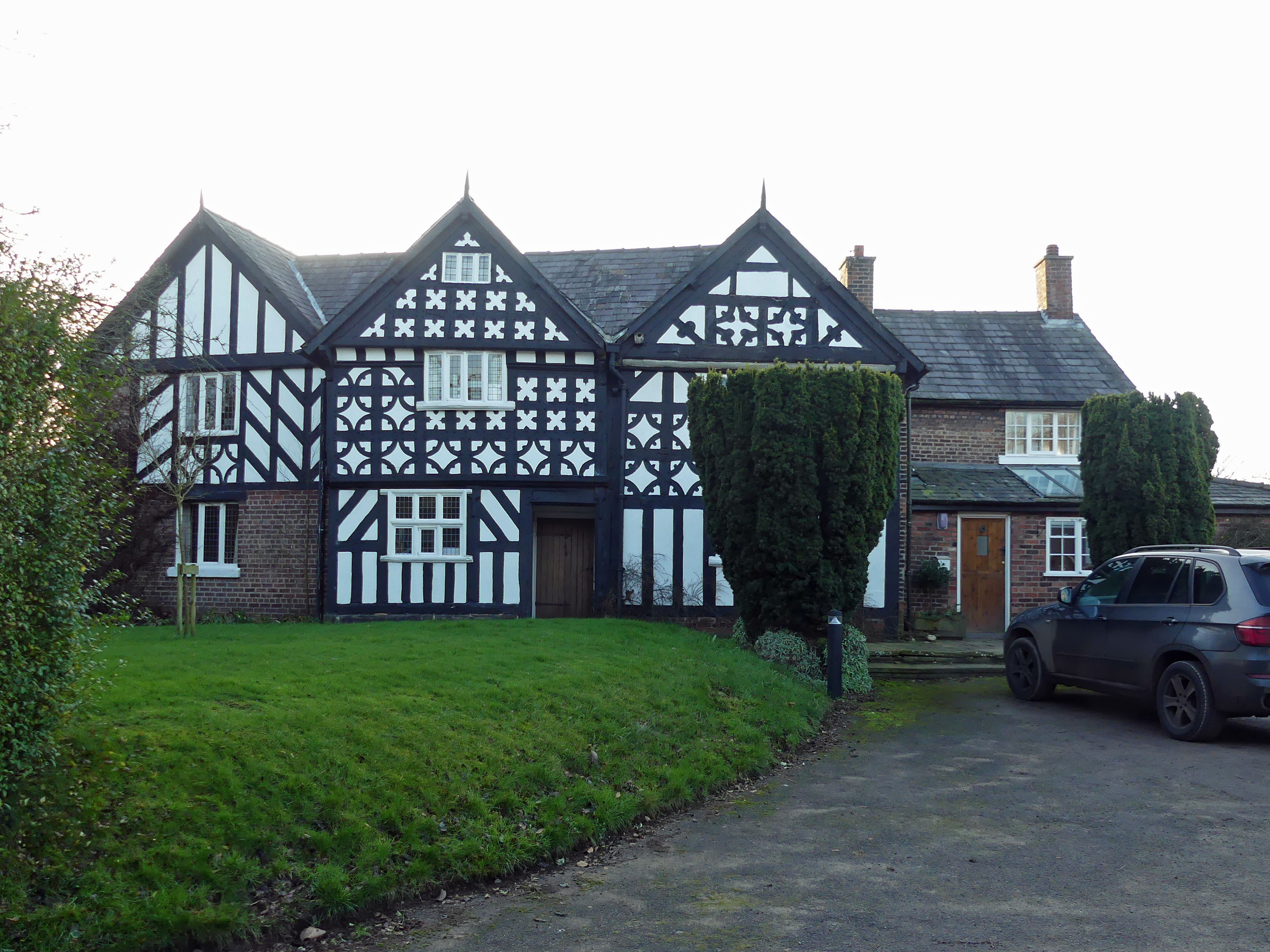
- Blackden Hall

- Blackden Hall in Cheshire
- 53.23004°N 2.32058°W
- Location: Goostrey, Cheshire East

History
- Built: 16th century

Listed Building – Grade II*
- Designated: 14 February 1967
- Reference no.: 1231131

Blackden Hall is a country house to the northeast of the village of Goostrey, Cheshire, England. It dates from the later part of the 16th century, and there have been later alterations. It is constructed in timber framing and brick with plastered panels. The house is in two storeys with an attic, and has an L-shaped plan. Its main front has three bays and is gabled. The central bay of the first floor is jettied. The timber framing is close studded, and decorated with roundels and chevrons. Most of the windows are mullioned with three lights. The authors of the Buildings of England series describe it as a "charming C17 timber-framed house". The house is recorded in the National Heritage List for England as a designated Grade II* listed building.

== See also ==
- Grade II* listed buildings in Cheshire East
- Listed buildings in Goostrey
