= Goostrey =

Village in Cheshire, England

Coordinates: 53.231232°N 2.336356°W

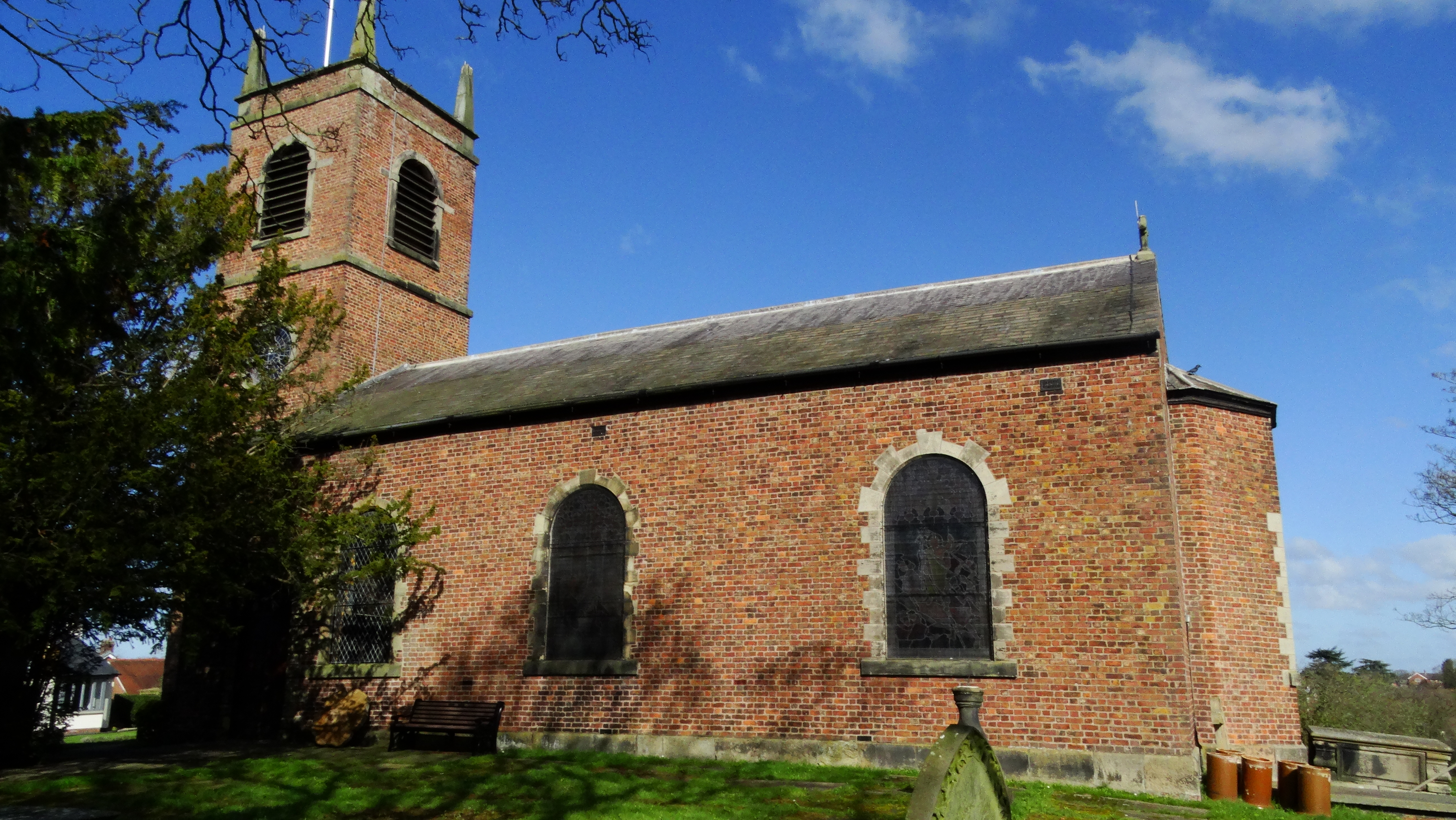
- St Luke's Church

- Location within Cheshire
- Population: 2,179
- OS grid reference: SJ775705
- Civil parish: Goostrey
- Unitary authority: Cheshire East
- Ceremonial county: Cheshire
- Region: North West
- Country: England
- Sovereign state: United Kingdom
- Post town: Crewe
- Postcode district: CW4
- Dialling code: 01477
- Police: Cheshire
- Fire: Cheshire
- Ambulance: North West
- UK Parliament: Congleton

Goostrey is a village and civil parish in the unitary authority of Cheshire East and the ceremonial county of Cheshire, England. It is in open countryside, 14 miles (23 km) north-east of Crewe and 12 miles (19 km) west of Macclesfield. The parish contains the Lovell Radio Telescope at Jodrell Bank Observatory, a UNESCO World Heritage site. At the 2011 census, it had a population of 2,179 in 956 housesholds. It contains 24 listed heritage assets and one scheduled monument (a bowl barrow near Jodrell Bank Farm). The parish also includes the hamlets of Blackden, Blackden Heath and Jodrell Bank.

== History ==
Goostrey may have been a meeting place or even a settlement during the 1st millennium BC, as stone and bronze axe heads and barrows within the parish boundary show the area was inhabited before the Iron Age. Bronze Age barrows have also been found near Twemlow Hall and Terra Nova School on the edge of the parish. The 1,200-year-old yew tree in Goostrey's churchyard suggests that the mound on which the church is built was a focal point for a community during the Dark Ages of the 1st millennium. At that time Cheshire was under the control of the Wreocensæte people of Mercia.

Goostrey first appears in recorded history in the Domesday Book of 1086, where it is spelt Gostrel. The name possibly means "Godhere's tree". At this time most of the parish was held by William FitzNigel, Baron of Halton, and by Hugh de Mara, another follower of the Earl of Chester. Hugh FitzNorman gave much land in Goostrey to endow the new Abbey of Saint Werburgh in Chester in 1119, as did a later owner, Baron Hugh of Mold. Some land in the parish or nearby Twemlow was also given to help endow the Vale Royal Abbey, near Northwich.

The Parish of Goostrey-cum-Barnshaw remained ecclesiastical property until the 14th century, leased out at first and then managed by the abbey directly. Abbey records mostly relate to maintenance of ditches, mills and fish ponds and give a picture of a scatter of small farms set amongst woods and heath supplying wood, flour and fish to the great Chester Abbey, some later gifted to the new foundation of Vale Royal Abbey.

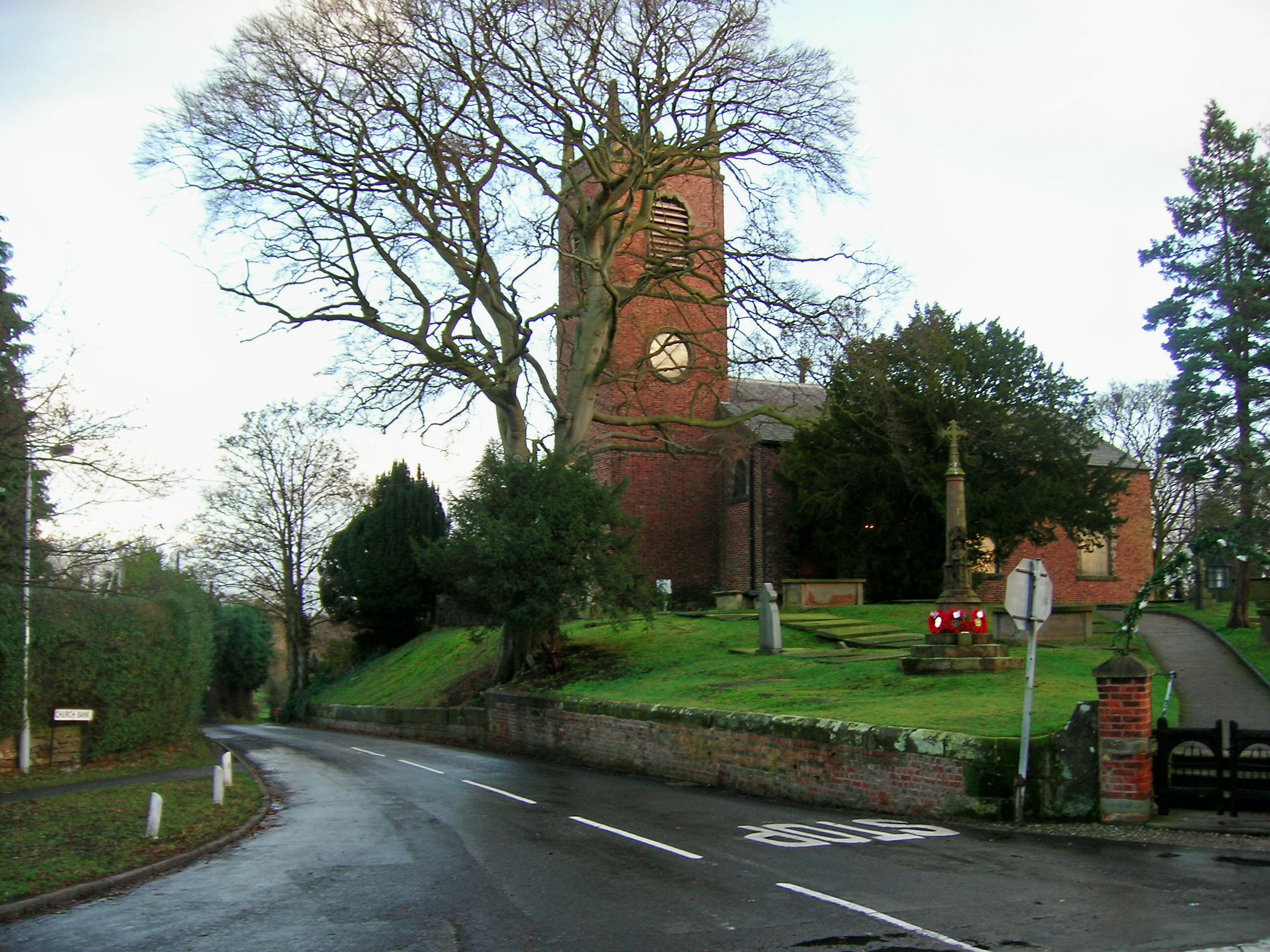
St Luke's Church, Goostrey

After the Dissolution of the Monasteries, the land was purchased by the Mainwaring family of Over Peover and remained part of that family's estate until the 20th century. From the 17th century, farming techniques improved and farms became bigger and more prosperous. Dairy farming and particularly the Cheshire speciality, cheese, thrived, shielding the county from poor harvests and low prices. Goostrey became a centre for a comparatively well-to-do farming community. The church, St Luke's, a wooden framed building built around 1220 was replaced by the present one of brick in 1792. The first recorded school early in the 17th century was rebuilt in 1775, a replacement built on another site in 1812 and that replaced by the present 'old' school in 1856 when some 62 boys and 40 girls were pupils. Also at that time, the village had at least two pubs, a mill, a blacksmith, two tailors, a shoemaker and two or three shops.

The Crewe to Manchester railway was built near the village in 1842, although Goostrey did not get its own station until 1891. The new station offered a market for milk and produce and brought in occasional trippers, temperance groups or Sunday schools out for a picnic. In the late 19th century, villas were built along Main Road and groups of cyclists began visiting the village, a connection which continues. After the First World War, motor cars were more frequent and the annual Goostrey horseraces became fashionable. Goostrey remained largely a farming community until the late 1930s, when the district council decided to build council housing in the village and to install mains drainage. In 1963, the first of three new estate developments was started and by 1970 the number of houses had quadrupled.

Though the new residents were initially seen as "incomers", many soon became active members of village clubs and societies. In 1976, the village's residents and activities were captured by a series of five one-hour ITV programmes titled Goostrey – A Village, which received a mixed welcome from the inhabitants themselves.

Community spirit has grown along with the village. A sports field (originally planned in the 1920s) finally became a reality in the 1990s, and both "old" and "new" residents were involved in planning the village's millennium celebrations. Recent community ventures include a sports pavilion, and a new children's play area in Boothbed Lane (completed in 2005).

== Geography ==
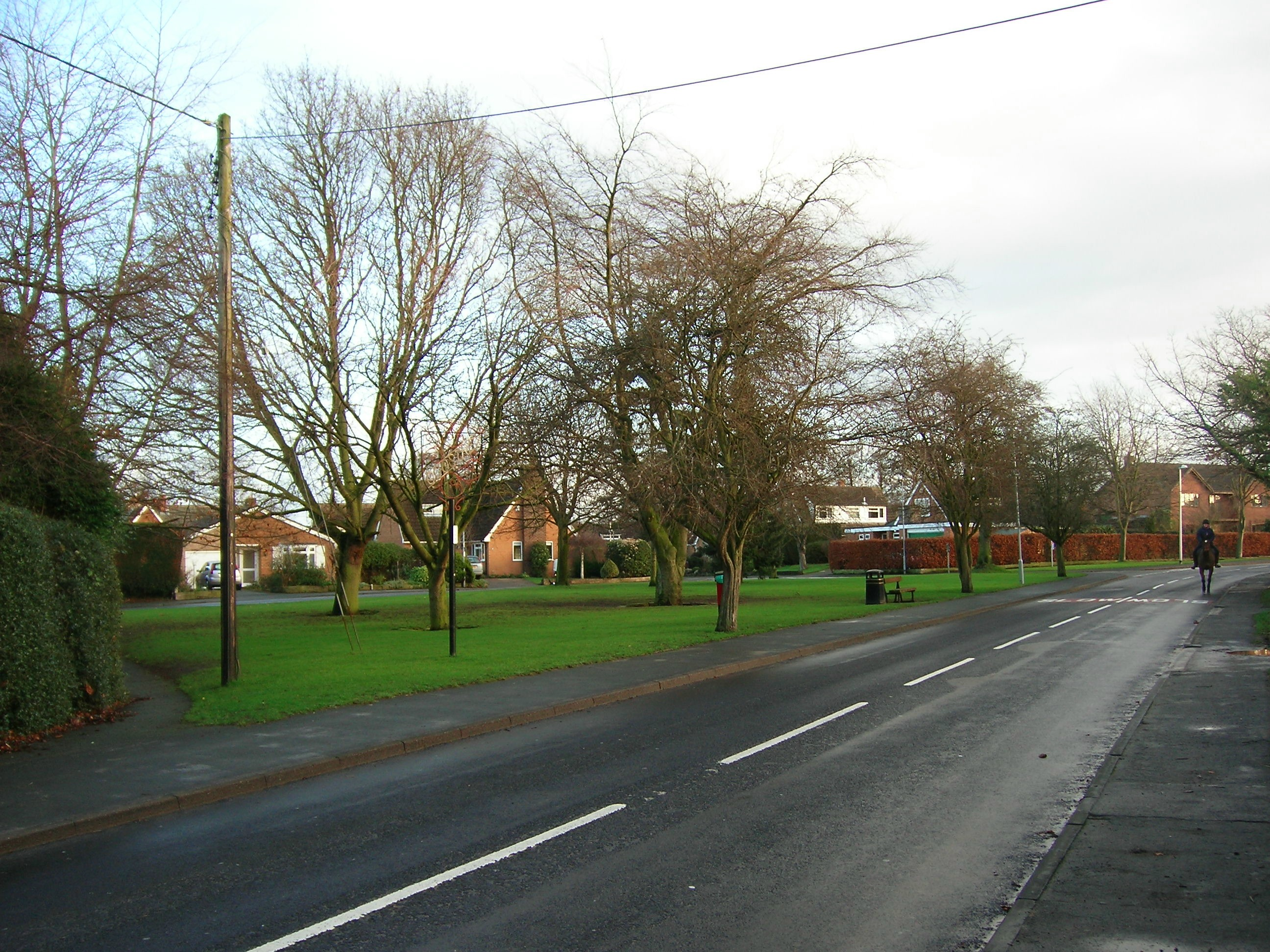
The Bog Bean – the village green at the centre of the village

The village of Goostrey sprawls east–west along a single main road, stretching about three miles (5 km). There are two main concentrations of houses, one in the west of the village containing a local shop and a small sports venue, and the other in the centre of the village. The east end of the village is marked by Goostrey railway station, which is on the Crewe–Manchester line.

Goostrey has a village primary school and St Luke's Church. There are two public houses, the Crown Inn and the Space Invader (formerly the Red Lion). Goostrey also has two general stores, a visiting post office, a cafe, a Turkish barbers and a pharmacy. There are also a number of small businesses in the village.

The wooded valley of Red Lion Brook on the northern side of the village is known as "The Bongs" and features in Alan Garner's play Holly from the Bongs, which was performed by the children of the village in the 1970s for the BBC. Alan Garner lives in the village in the late 16th-century house known as Toad Hall and set his popular novel The Weirdstone of Brisingamen in nearby Alderley Edge.

Goostrey is near Holmes Chapel; most of the village children attend Holmes Chapel Comprehensive School after leaving Goostrey Primary School. Goostrey is also near Knutsford, Wilmslow, Alderley Edge and Sandbach.

== Community and culture ==
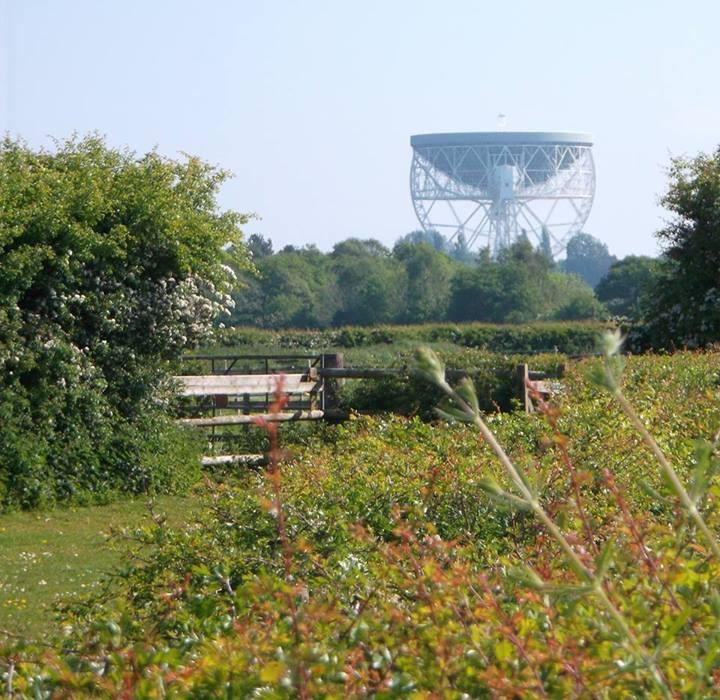
The Lovell Telescope looking skyward, taken from Station Road, Goostrey, near the livery stables

Goostrey Rose Day is the annual summer village fête which is held on the last Saturday of June. The village children, organisations and the young at hearts dress in fancy-dress costumes and parade through the village. To mark the centenary, Goostrey held a scarecrow competition for the whole village to participate in, which has now become an annual event in the village. Photos of past Goostrey Rose Days can be seen in the Crown Inn.

There is a popular local tradition of gooseberry growing, and an annual Goostrey Gooseberry Show. A plaque in the Crown Inn lists all of the show's past winners.

Goostrey is a thriving village with a close-knit community and has many clubs and organisations for all ages. The village has a village hall as well as a park and children's play area. The village also has its own sports pavilion and facilities which are available to village residents and include a bowling green, football pitch and tennis courts.

An active footpaths group keeps the many public footpaths around the village in good order. More Goostrey Walks & Strolls details nine walks around the village and is available via the group's website. It has photos, maps needed for the walks and is a mine of historical and ecological information about Goostrey.

In 2006, Goostrey became one of the first villages in the United Kingdom to have its own profile on the social networking website MySpace.

2007 saw the introduction of the Goostrey Arts Festival. Also known as "Goosfest", the week-long showcase comprises a wide variety of events promoting the cultural life of the village, consisting of amateur and professional practitioners (many of whom are local) across a wide range of the arts, including stand-up comedy, classical, folk and contemporary music, pottery, photography and paintings. The majority of the events take place in the village hall, the Crown Inn and St Luke's Church.

The Lovell Telescope sits within Goostrey parish. This has resulted in a number of housing development submissions being refused, because of the adverse effect that they would have on the work of the dish. The world headquarters of the SKA (Square Kilometre Array Observatory) is also in Goostrey parish.

== See also ==
- Listed buildings in Goostrey
