= Crewe–Manchester line =

Railway line in the UK

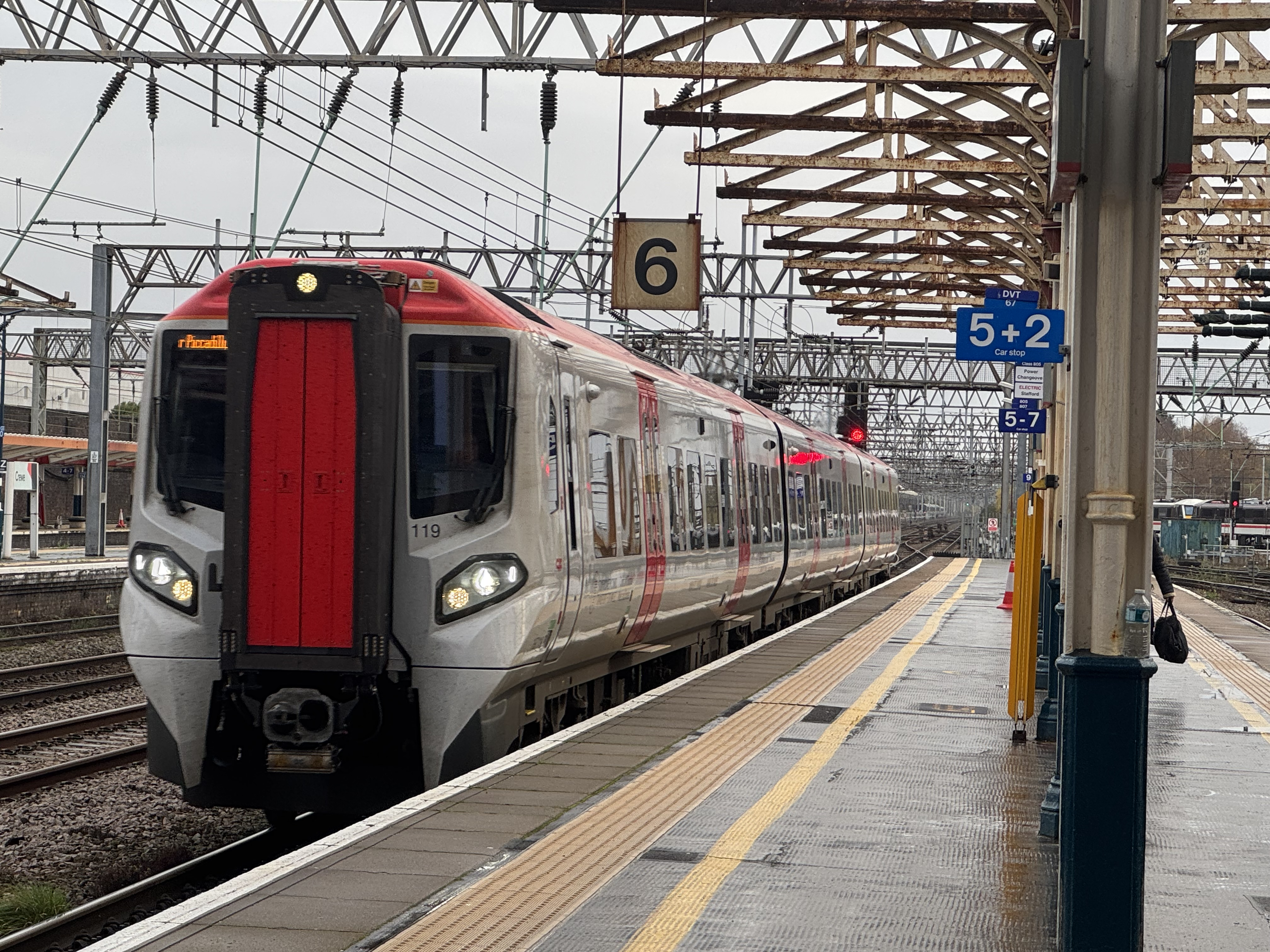
- Transport for Wales Rail Class 197 at Crewe

Overview
- Owner: Network Rail
- Locale: Stockport; Crewe; Cheshire; Manchester; North West England

Service
- Type: Heavy rail
- System: National Rail
- Operator(s): Avanti West Coast; CrossCountry; Northern Trains; TransPennine Express; Transport for Wales Rail
- Rolling stock: Primarily: British Rail Class 67/British Rail Mark 4 Class 197; Class 323; Class 331; Class 390

Technical
- Track gauge: 1,435 mm (4 ft 8 1/2 in) standard gauge
- Operating speed: 110 mph (180 km/h)
Route map
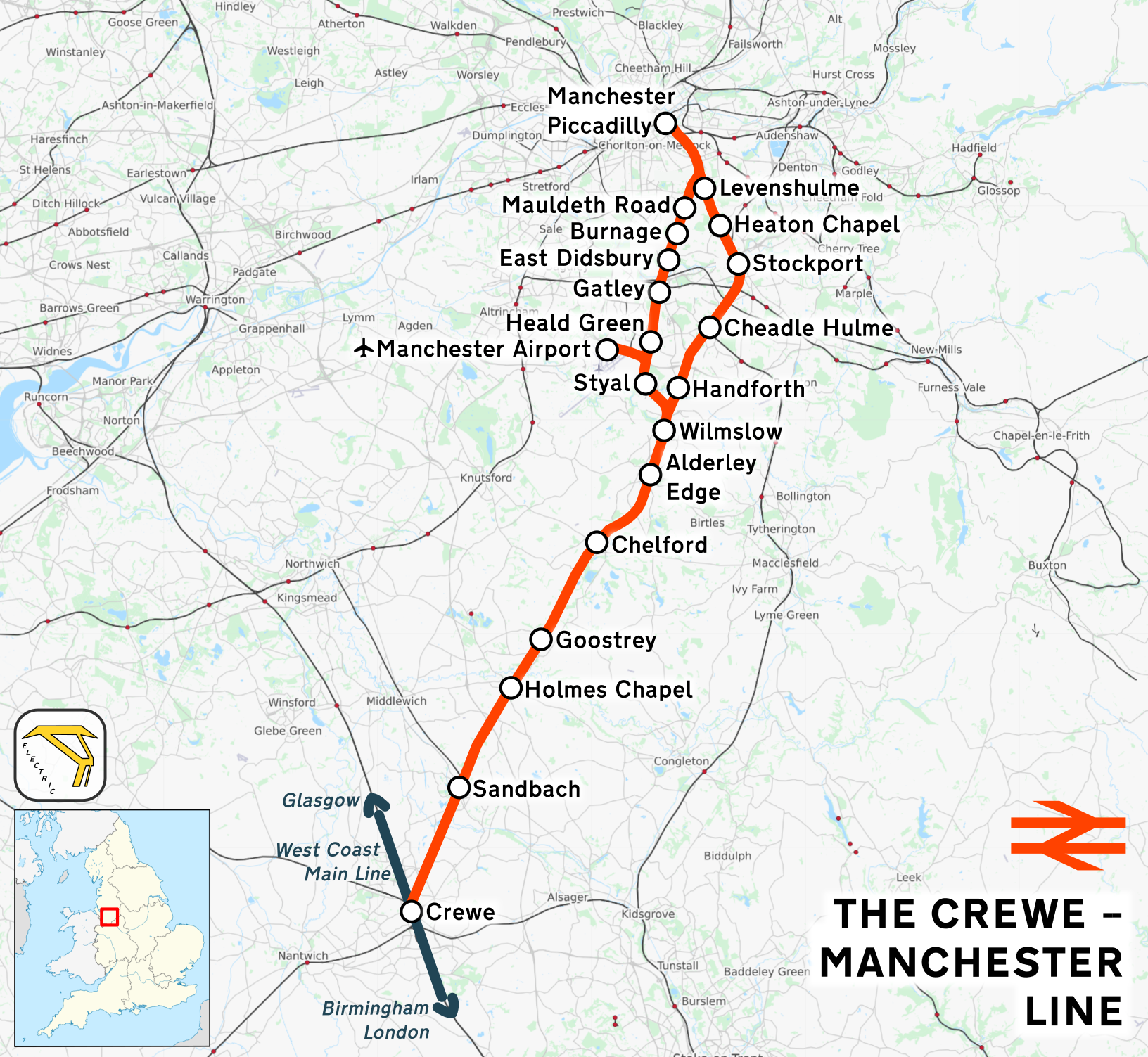
(Click to expand)

The Crewe–Manchester line is a railway line in North West England, running between Crewe and Manchester Piccadilly. It is a spur of the West Coast Main Line.

== History ==
The line was built by the Manchester and Birmingham Railway Company, which diverted to Crewe in 1841 and merged in 1846 with others to form the London and North Western Railway Company. This, in turn, became part of the London Midland and Scottish Railway in 1923.

The route from Crewe to Manchester Piccadilly, including the Styal line, was the first section of the West Coast Main Line to be electrified, in 1959. The line was upgraded in the early 2000s, as part of the West Coast Main Line modernisation programme. A full service resumed on the line in March 2007.

The line is joined at Cheadle Hulme by the West Coast spur from Stoke-on-Trent. At Stockport, it is then joined by the Mid-Cheshire line from Chester, the Hope Valley Line from Sheffield, and by the Buxton line.

In April 2006, Network Rail organised its maintenance and train control operations into '26 Routes'; the Crewe–Manchester line was included in Route 20 (North West Urban).

== Services ==
Northern Trains operates services between Crewe, Alderley Edge and Manchester Piccadilly, via Stockport and the Styal line via Manchester Airport. A number of the Crewe / Alderley Edge – Piccadilly services also extend beyond Piccadilly to terminate at Liverpool Lime Street, Southport and Wigan North Western. Also, a number of services to/from Manchester start or terminate at Wilmslow.

Transport for Wales Rail operates a through express service between Milford Haven and Cardiff, via the Welsh Marches line, to Manchester.

Avanti West Coast operates West Coast Main Line services between London Euston, Crewe and Manchester.

CrossCountry also operates a small number of services on the line between Manchester Piccadilly, Birmingham New Street and the South.
