= Cranage Hall =

Country house in Cranage, Cheshire, England

Coordinates: 53.21131°N 2.37578°W

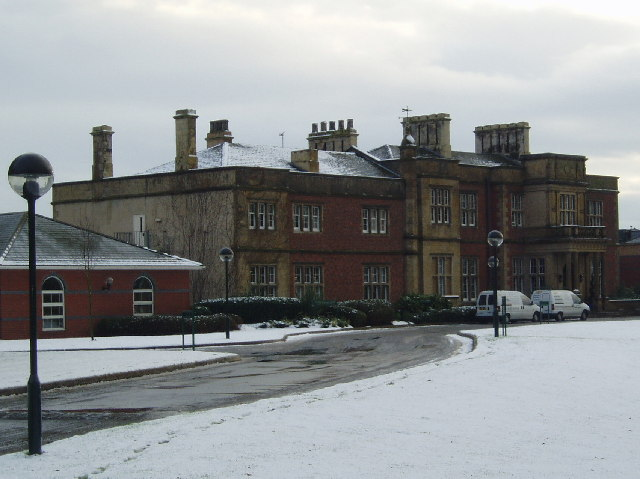
Cranage Hall in winter

Cranage Hall is a former country house in the village of Cranage, Cheshire, England.

== History ==
It is believed that it was built in the 17th century incorporating elements of an earlier hall. The present Hall was built in 1828–29 for Lawrence Armitstead, and designed by Lewis Wyatt. It was occupied by the family until 1920, after which it was used as part of the Cranage Hospital. In 1932 a parallel wing was added. Since the hospital closed, it has been used as a hotel and conference centre owned and run by the Principal Hayley hotel group.

== Description ==
The building is constructed in red brick with blue brick diapering, and in yellow sandstone. It is roofed in slate. The architectural style is Elizabethan. The building is in two storeys plus a basement, and it has eight bays. The first and fourth bays are in stone; the others are in brick. In front of the sixth and seven bays is a two-storey stone porch with four fluted Doric columns, an entablature with a frieze, and a balcony with an openwork balustrade. Between the third and fourth bays is a slim octagonal tower with an ogee cap and a weathervane. The house is recorded in the National Heritage List for England as a designated Grade II listed building.

== Present Day ==
Cranage Hall was redeveloped by Hayley Conference Centres and reopened as a 120 bedroom, 29 meeting room hotel and conference venue with a leisure club in 1998. In 2007 Hayley Conference Centres was bought by and merged with Principal Hotels to become the Principal Hayley group. Since the 2016 merger with De Vere Venues, the hotel was rebranded as De Vere Cranage Estate and now has 150 bedrooms and 2 luxury suites.

== See also ==
- Listed buildings in Cranage
