= Listed buildings in Cranage =

Cranage is a civil parish in Cheshire East, England. It contains 12 buildings that are recorded in the National Heritage List for England as designated listed buildings. Of these, one is listed at Grade II*, the middle grade, and the others are at Grade II. Apart from the village of Cranage, and some residential areas, the parish is rural. Most of the listed buildings are houses and cottages, or farmhouses and farm buildings. The other listed buildings are a former country house, a former vicarage, a school, a bridge, and a milepost.

== Key ==
Grade	Criteria
II*	Particularly important buildings of more than special interest
II	Buildings of national importance and special interest

== Buildings ==
Name and location	Photograph	Date	Notes	Grade
Hollins Farmhouse; 53.21164°N 2.35588°W		Early 17th century	The farmhouse was altered in 1885. It is partly timber-framed with brick nogging, and partly in brick, standing on a stone plinth. The farmhouse is in two storeys, the upper floor being jettied, and it has an L-shaped plan. The entrance front is in two bays, with a wing of three bays. The windows are casements, some in gabled half-dormers.	II
Hawthorn Cottage; 53.21834°N 2.34942°W	—	Mid-17th century	The cottage is timber-framed with brick nogging and some exposed wattle and daub. The roof is covered in corrugated sheeting. The cottage is in a single storey with an attic, and the windows are casements.	II
Manor Farmhouse; 53.21192°N 2.36899°W	—	Late 17th century	A brick farmhouse, with a timber-framed core, stuccoed at the rear, and with tiled roofs. It is in two storeys and has a front of five bays. There are two rear wings, giving the building an F-shaped plan. The ground floor windows are sashes, and the windows in the upper floor are casements. Inside is a full cruck and an inglenook.	II
Barn, Manor Farm; 53.21163°N 2.36911°W	—	Late 17th century	The barn is built in brick with a stone slate roof. It is in a single storey, and has a five-bay front. The hopper windows have stone heads and sills.	II
Rose Cottage; 53.21650°N 2.37188°W	—	Late 17th century	The cottage is timber-framed with brick nogging and a thatched roof. It is in a single storey with an attic, and has a three-bay front. The windows are casements, those in the attic being in gables. On the front is a brick porch with a thatched roof.	II
Swan Farmhouse; 53.21196°N 2.36971°W	—	Late 17th century	The farmhouse is built in brick with a stone slate roof. It has an L-shaped plan, is in two storeys with an attic, and has a three-bay front. The windows are casements. Inside the farmhouse is an inglenook, and a Jacobean-style staircase.	II*
Old Vicarage Hotel; 53.20681°N 2.36498°W	—	Early 18th century	This was originally a vicarage, later converted into a hotel. It is in rendered brick with a slate roof, and has three storeys. There is a main block with a three-bay front, and a two-storey, single-bay wing on each side. In the centre is a gabled porch leading to a doorway with flanking pilasters. The windows are sashes.	II
Hermitage Bridge; 53.20713°N 2.35202°W		1772	The bridge carries a lane over the River Dane. Part of it is in the parish of Holmes Chapel. The bridge is built in sandstone with a single segmental arch. It has a humped carriageway paved with stone setts. The date is carved in to the parapet.	II
Milepost; 53.21351°N 2.37288°W	—	c. 1820	The milepost is in cast iron with an acorn-shaped top. It is about 60 centimetres (24 in) high and 15 centimetres (5.9 in) in diameter. The post carries a panel divided into three parts. The centre part is inscribed "Cranage", and the outer parts give the distances in miles to Knutsford and to Holmes Chapel.	II
Cranage Hall; 53.21129°N 2.37581°W		1828–29	This originated as a country house, designed by Lewis Wyatt in Elizabethan style. It was extended in 1932, and has been used as a hospital, a conference centre, and then as a hotel. It is built in red brick with blue brick diapering and stone dressings, and has a slate roof. The building is in two storeys with a basement, and has an eight-bay front. Its features include a two-storey porch with Doric columns and a balcony with a balustrade, and a slim octagonal tower with an ogee cap and a weathervane.	II
Cranage School; 53.20722°N 2.36668°W		1849	This originated as a school with an attached master's house. It is built in red brick with diapering in blue brick, and with stone dressings and a tiled roof, in Jacobean style. The house is in two storeys, the school in a single storey. The school has a five-bay front. The gables are shaped.	II
Round House; 53.21398°N 2.40145°W	—	1852	A brick farmhouse with a slate roof, it is in two storeys, and has a three-bay front. The farmhouse has a rear wing, giving it a T-shaped plan. The windows are casements, and there is a projecting gabled porch.	II

== See also ==
- Listed buildings in Allostock
- Listed buildings in Byley
- Listed buildings in Goostrey
- Listed buildings in Holmes Chapel
- Listed buildings in Sproston
- Listed buildings in Twemlow
