= Cranage =

Village in England

Coordinates: 53.213°N 2.372°W

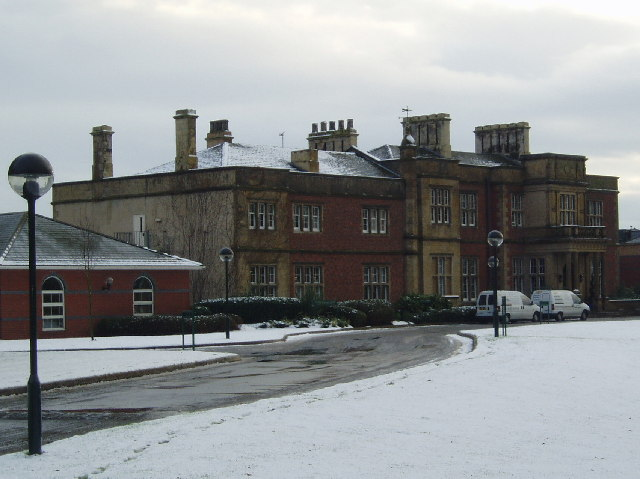
- Cranage Hall

- Location within Cheshire
- Population: 1,184
- OS grid reference: SJ752686
- Civil parish: Cranage
- Unitary authority: Cheshire East
- Ceremonial county: Cheshire
- Region: North West
- Country: England
- Sovereign state: United Kingdom
- Post town: CREWE
- Postcode district: CW4
- Dialling code: 01477
- Police: Cheshire
- Fire: Cheshire
- Ambulance: North West
- UK Parliament: Congleton

Cranage is a village and civil parish in the unitary authority of Cheshire East and the ceremonial county of Cheshire, England. According to the 2001 UK Census, the population of the civil parish was 1,131 which had risen to 1,184 by the 2011 census.

== History ==
The establishment of a community in Cranage is mentioned in the Domesday Book. The name derives from the Old English of Crāwena-læcc, which means crows stream. The manor of Cranage, unlike many estates, has not remained in one family but had changed hands many times. Historically, Cranage was an agricultural area which had a wide variation of farming activities.

Cranage Hall was one of the principal dwellings in the area. It is believed that it was built in the 17th century incorporating elements of an earlier hall. Lawrence Armistead had the hall demolished in the 19th century and the current Cranage Hall built in 1829, to a design by Lewis Wyatt. The Hall remained in possession of the Armistead family until 1920. Subsequently, it was converted into part of the Cranage hospital, and on the hospital's closure became a conference centre.

The parish contains neither a church nor a chapel that is currently used. but is served by the nearby church of St. Luke, Holmes Chapel. The village school was closed in 1990 as a result of the drop in the number of pupils. There is no shop or post office in the parish.

The Old Vicarage Hotel, originally built in the 17th century, provides accommodation. The Swan Inn, an earlier source of accommodation, has changed purpose and is now Swan Farm.

A Journey through Time: Holmes Chapel, Cotton and Cranage, by Annabel Capewell, Rosemary Dear, Patricia Dingle, Rodney Smith, Terry Taylor and Janet Yarwood was published in 1996.

== See also ==
- Listed buildings in Cranage
