= Agricultural show =

Public event exhibiting agriculture equipment

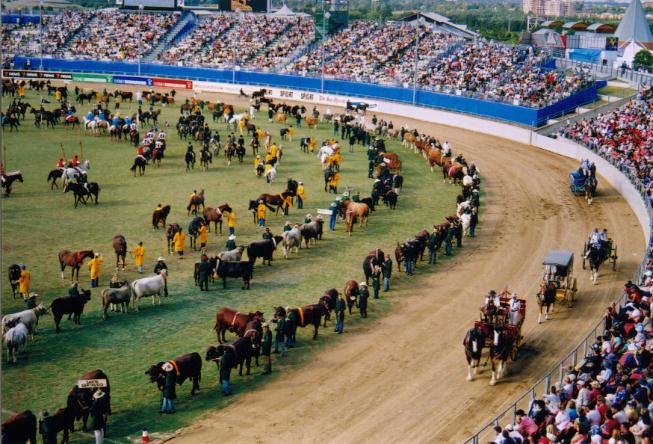
An agricultural show parade

An agricultural show, county show or farm show is a public event exhibiting the equipment, animals, sports and recreation associated with agriculture and animal husbandry. The largest comprise a livestock show (a judged event or display in which breeding stock is exhibited), a trade fair, competitions, and entertainment. The work and practices of farmers, animal fanciers, cowboys, and zoologists may be displayed. The terms agricultural show and livestock show are synonymous with the North American terms county fair and state fair, and the UK county show.

Agricultural shows tend to be important events for sharing different agricultural practices or techniques, learning about new technologies or celebrating achievements by producers through competitions.

== History ==
The first known agricultural show was held by Salford Agricultural Society, Lancashire, in 1768.

== Events ==
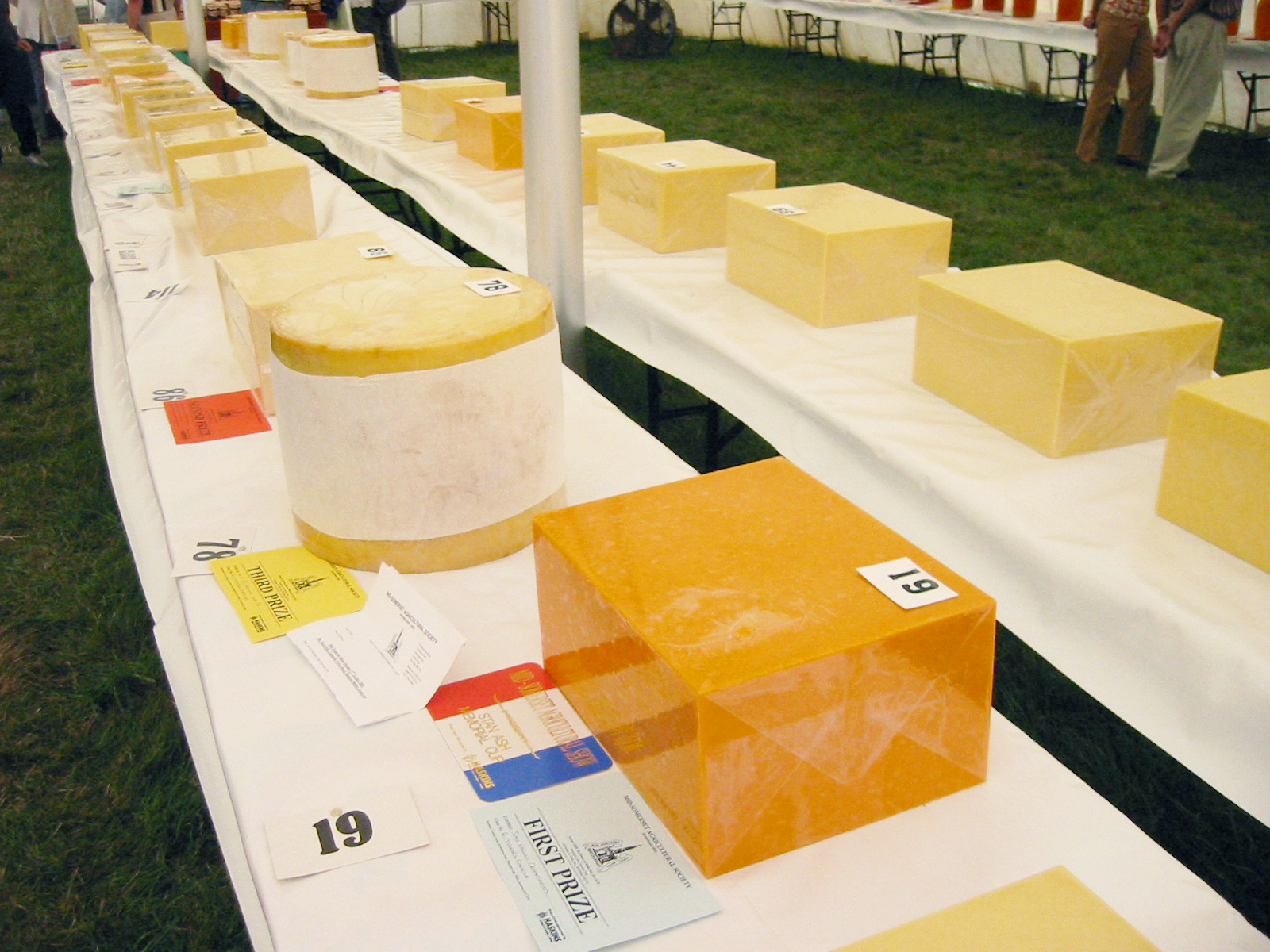
Cheddar cheese competition.

Since the 19th century, agricultural shows have provided local people with an opportunity to celebrate achievements and enjoy a break from day-to-day routine. With a combination of serious competition and light entertainment, annual shows acknowledged and rewarded the hard work and skill of primary producers and provided a venue for rural families to socialise. City shows also provide city people with an opportunity to engage directly with rural life and food production.

Agriculture shows are often enlivened with competitive events, including sheaf tossing, show jumping, food competitions, and tent pegging. Demolition derbies and rodeos are popular in the United States and campdrafting and wood chopping are often held in Australia.

Studs are generally available for a fee.

=== Livestock shows ===
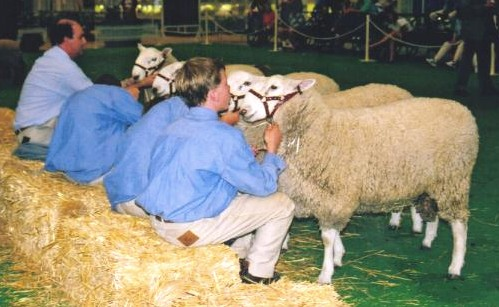
Border Leicesters lined up for the judge

A livestock show is an event where livestock are exhibited and judged on certain phenotypical breed traits as specified by their respective breed standard. Species of livestock that may be shown include pigs, cattle, sheep, goats, horses, rabbits, llamas, and alpacas. Poultry such as chickens, geese, ducks, turkeys, and pigeons are also shown competitively. There are also competitive shows for dogs, sheepdogs, and cats.

Prize-winners at agricultural shows are generally awarded inscribed medals, cups, rosettes or ribbons. The National Museum of Australia has a rare collection of medals documenting the history of agricultural shows and rural industries across Australia. The 111 medals range in date from the mid-19th to the early 20th century and many are associated with significant individuals and organizations.

In the United States, agricultural fairs are a significant exposure source for swine influenza. Certain strains of swine influenza can be transmitted from pig to pig, pig to human, and human to human; swine influenza infection does not always show signs of illness.

=== Field days ===
Related to a show is the "field day", with elements of a trade show for machinery, equipment and skills required for broadacre farming. Field days typically do not involve livestock, show bags or sideshows, but may include events such as ploughing competitions not usually associated with shows due to the larger space required. In some communities in northern England Field Days (or Club Days) have lost their agricultural character and have become community celebrations.

The events are good sources of agricultural information, as organizers can arrange for guest speakers to talk on a range of topics, such as the talk on the yellow-flowering alfalfa at the South Dakota field day.

A Landcare survey conducted in 1992/93 revealed that field days in Australia have a high value among local farmers. New Zealand's National Agricultural Fieldays is held annually in June at Mystery Creek, near Hamilton, New Zealand, and attracts 1,000 exhibitors and over 115,000 visitors through its gates. Smaller agricultural shows, held annually in New Zealand's towns and communities, are generally called "agricultural and pastoral shows" ("A&P shows").

== List of agricultural shows ==
=== Asia ===
==== China ====
- China International Agrochemical & Crop Protection Exhibition – Shanghai

==== India ====
- KISAN Fair – Pune, Maharashtra

==== Japan ====
- Agri Week Tokyo

==== Malaysia ====
- Malaysia Agriculture, Horticulture & Agro-Tourism Exhibition (MAHA) – Serdang, Selangor

==== Saudi Arabia ====
- Mazayen al-Ibl

==== Taiwan ====
- Asia Agri-Tech Expo & Forum – Taipei

=== South America ===
==== Argentina ====
- Expoagro – San Nicolás de los Arroyos
- La Rural – Buenos Aires

==== Brazil ====
- Agrishow – Ribeirão Preto, São Paulo
- AgroBrasília – Brasília
- Bahia Farm Show – Luís Eduardo Magalhães, Bahia
- Expodireto Cotrijal – Não-Me-Toque, Rio Grande do Sul
- Expointer – Esteio, Rio Grande do Sul
- Expozebu – Uberaba, Minas Gerais
- Megaleite – Belo Horizonte, Minas Gerais
- Show Rural Coopavel – Cascavel, Paraná
- Tecnoshow Comigo – Rio Verde, Goiás

==== Colombia ====
- Agroexpo – Bogotá

=== Oceania ===
==== New Zealand ====
- Canterbury A&P Show – Christchurch
- Fieldays – Hamilton
- National Agricultural Fieldays
- Royal New Zealand Show

==== Australia ====
Incomplete list of shows in Australia:

- Atherton show
- Ballarat Show
- Beaudesert Show
- Bendigo Show
- Boonah Show
- Bream Creek Show
- Camden Show
- Ekka
- Esk Show
- Gawler Show
- Gold Coast Show
- Gympie District Show
- Hawkesbury Show
- Huon Show
- Kangaroo Valley Show
- Kalbar Show
- Kingaroy Show
- Korumburra Show
- Malanda show
- Mareeba Rodeo and Agricultural Show
- Melbourne Royal Show
- Mildura Show
- Moss Vale Show
- Mudgeeraba Show
- Nanango Show
- Newcastle Show
- Nowra Show
- Perth Royal Show
- Robertson Show
- Royal Adelaide Show
- Royal Bathurst Show
- Royal Canberra Show
- Royal Darwin Show
- Royal Geelong Show
- Royal Hobart Show
- Royal Launceston Show
- Royal Norfolk Island Show
- Royal Toowoomba Show
- Sydney Royal Easter Show
- Wanneroo Agricultural Show
- Warragul Show
- Warrnambool Show

=== North America ===
==== Canada ====
- Ayer's Cliff Fair – Ayer's Cliff, Quebec
- Brome Fair – Brome, Quebec
- Calgary Stampede – Calgary, Alberta
- Canadian National Exhibition – Toronto, Ontario
- Canadian Western Agribition – Regina, Saskatchewan
- Farm Fair – Prince Albert, Saskatchewan
- Grande Prairie Stompede – Grande Prairie, Alberta
- Hants County Exhibition – Windsor, Nova Scotia
- Pacific National Exhibition – Vancouver, British Columbia
- Royal Agricultural Winter Fair – Toronto, Ontario
- Royal Manitoba Winter Fair – Brandon, Manitoba
- Schomberg Fair – Schomberg, Ontario

==== Jamaica ====
- Denbigh Agricultural Show : The Denbigh Show is the oldest, largest and most dynamic agricultural show in the English-speaking Caribbean, and one of Jamaica's most iconic events, and was held for the first time in 1952. The Denbigh Show has achieved the name for the Caribbean's premier agricultural event, and epitomizes wholesome family entertainment and attracts over 80,000 patrons to the event annually.

==== Mexico ====
- Expo Agroalimentaria Guanajuato – Irapuato, Guanajuato

==== United States ====
- American Royal – Kansas City, Missouri
- Brooklyn Fair – Brooklyn, Connecticut
- Cinco Días con Nuestra Tierra – Mayagüez, Puerto Rico
- Clay County Fair – Spencer, Iowa
- Dutchess County Fair – Rhinebeck, New York
- El Dorado County Fair – Placerville, California
- Elkhart County 4-H Fair – Goshen, Indiana
- Laporte County 4-H Fair -

Laporte, Indiana

- Erie County Fair – Hamburg, New York
- Farm Progress Show – Dacatur and Boone, Iowa (alternate years)
- Fort Worth Stock Show and Rodeo – Fort Worth, Texas
- Fulton County Fair – Wauseon, Ohio
- Great Allentown Fair – Allentown, Pennsylvania
- Houston Livestock Show and Rodeo – Houston, Texas
- National Farm Machinery Show – Louisville, Kentucky
- National Western Stock Show – Denver, Colorado
- North American International Livestock Exposition – Louisville, Kentucky
- Pennsylvania Farm Show – Harrisburg, Pennsylvania
- San Antonio Stock Show & Rodeo – San Antonio, Texas
- Topsfield Fair – Topsfield, Massachusetts

=== Africa ===
==== South Africa ====
- Bathurst Agricultural Show – Bathurst
- Rand Easter Show – Johannesburg
- The Royal Agricultural Show www.royalshow.co.za – Pietermaritzburg
- Nampo – Bothaville

==== Kenya ====
- Nairobi international trade fair – Nairobi

=== Europe ===
==== Belgium ====
- Agribex – Brussels
- Interpom Primeurs – Roeselare

==== Denmark ====
- Roskilde Dyrskue – Roskilde, Denmark

==== Finland ====
- OKRA – Oripää, Finland

==== France ====
- Paris International Agricultural Show – Paris
- Salon international du machinisme agricole – Paris
- Salon du fromage et des produits laitiers – Paris

==== Germany ====
- Agritechnica – Hanover
- Berlin International Green Week (IGW) – Berlin
- EuroTier – Hanover

==== (Republic of Ireland) Ireland ====
- National Ploughing Championships – various sites
- Ballinasloe Horse Fair
- Banagher Horse Fair
- Clifden Show
- Tullamore Show

==== Italy ====
- EIMA International – Bologna

==== Netherlands ====
- GreenTech Amsterdam

==== Norway ====
- Dyrskun – Seljord Municipality, Norway

==== Poland ====
- Agro Show – Poznań

==== Russia ====
- Agrosalon – Moscow
- YugAgro – Krasnodar

==== Spain ====
- Agropec – Gijón
- F.I.M.A. International Fair of Agricultural Machinery – Zaragoza

==== Turkey ====
- Agroexpo – Izmir

==== United Kingdom ====
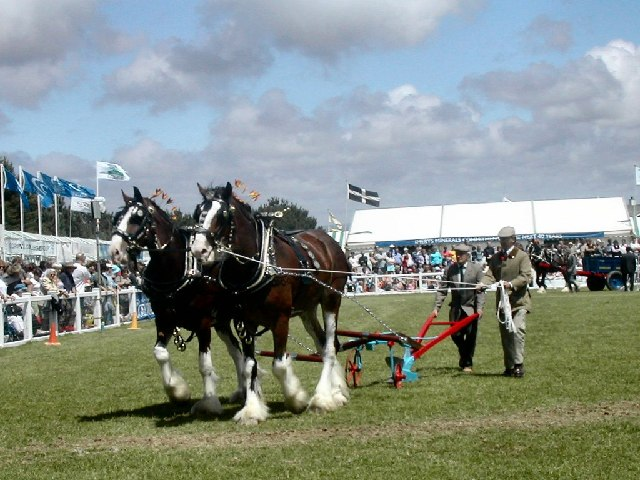
The main ring at the Royal Cornwall Show in June 2004

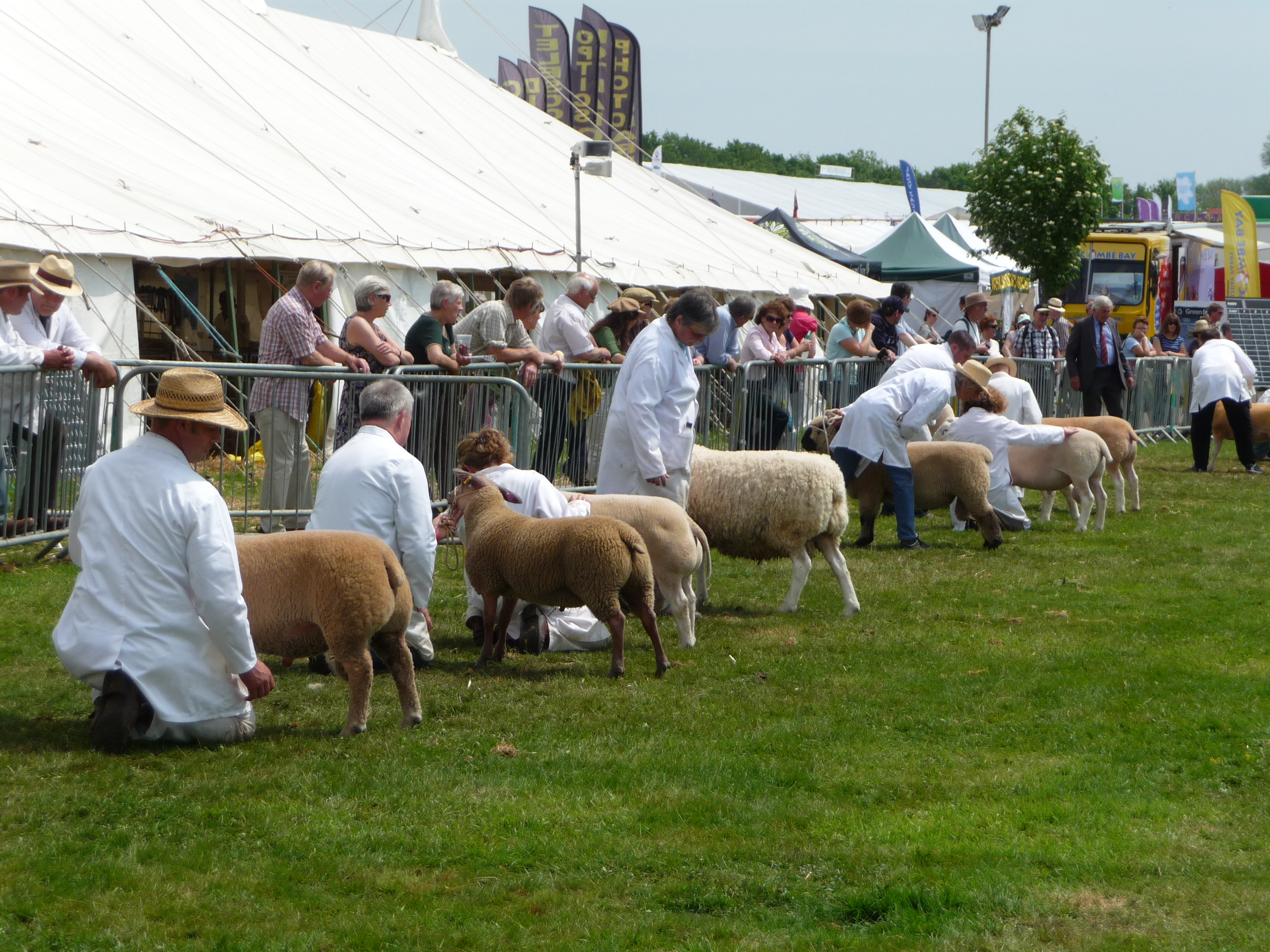
Sheep judging at the Devon County Show 2010

- Bakewell Show – Bakewell, Derbyshire
- Balmoral Show – Northern Ireland
- Black Isle Show – Muir of Ord, Scotland
- Cheshire County Show – Cheshire
- Devon County Show – Clyst St Mary, Devon
- Dumfries & Lockerbie Agricultural Society – Dumfries, Dumfriesshire
- East of England Show – Peterborough, Cambridgeshire
- Emley Show – Emley, West Yorkshire
- Grassland & Muck
- Great Yorkshire Show – Harrogate, North Yorkshire
- Hanbury Countryside Show – Hanbury, Worcestershire
- Keith Show – Keith, Banffshire
- Monmouth Show – Monmouth, Monmouthshire
- North Devon Show – Devon
- Newport Show – Newport, Shropshire
- The New Forest and Hampshire County Show
- Royal County of Berkshire Show – Newbury, Berkshire
- Royal Show – Stoneleigh, Warwickshire (now defunct)
- Royal Highland Show – Ingliston, Edinburgh
- Royal Isle of Wight Agricultural Society – Cowes, Isle of Wight
- Royal Norfolk Show – Costessey, Norfolk
- Royal Welsh Show – Llanelwedd, Powys
- Royal Bath and West Show – Shepton Mallet, Somerset
- Royal Cornwall Agricultural Show – Wadebridge, Cornwall
- Royal Three Counties – Malvern, Worcestershire
- Shropshire and West Midlands Show
- South of England Show – Sussex
- Stanhope Show
- Suffolk Show
- Tendring Hundred Show
- Wensleydale Agricultural Show
- Westmorland County Show

== See also ==
- Agritourism
- Lakeland Shows
- State fair
- Trade fair
- Horse show
- Royal Windsor Horse Show
