= AgQuip =

Australian agricultural event

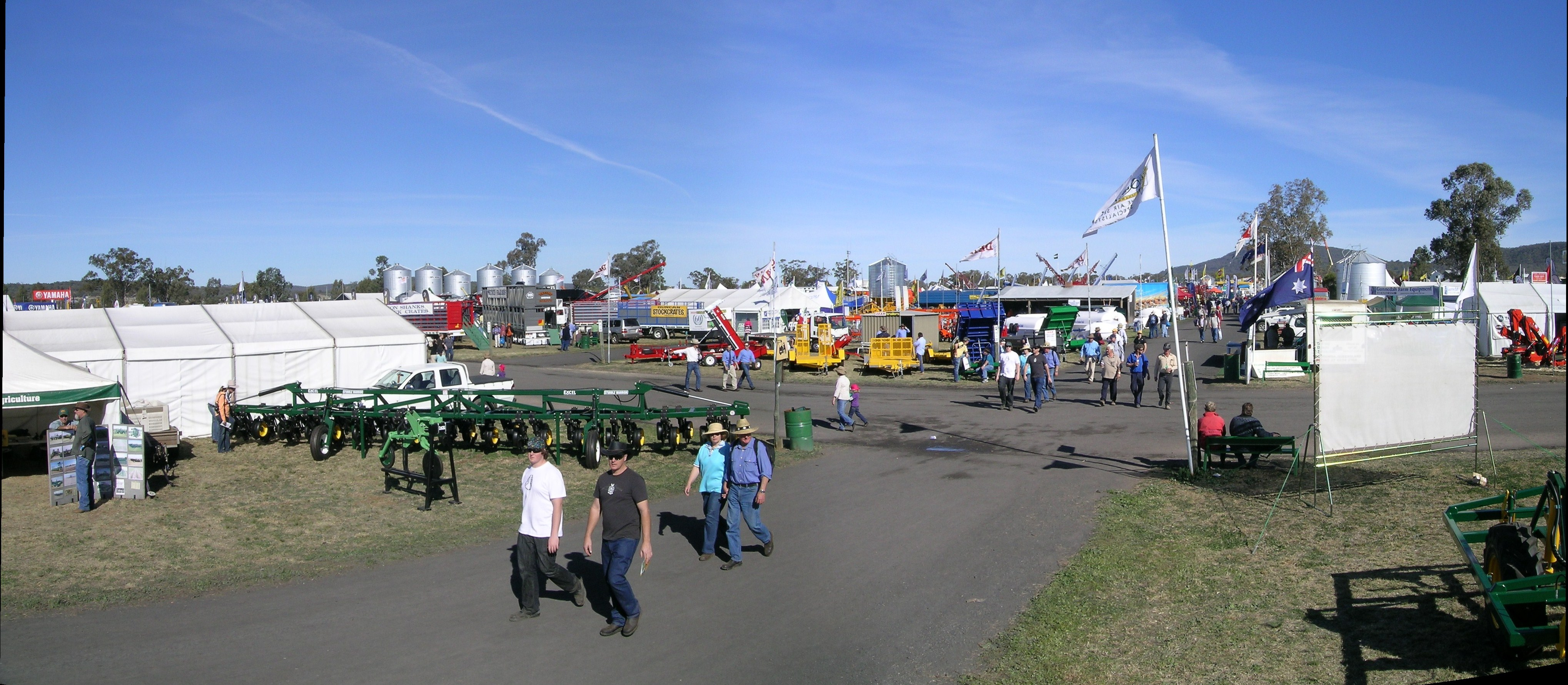
A small part of the AgQuip site

AgQuip is Australia's largest and premier primary industry field days and one of the largest agricultural events in the world. The nation's biggest agricultural event showcases over 3,000 individual companies and attracts over 100,000 visitors from across the nation and overseas. The event runs over three days, Tuesday to Thursday, in August, 8 kilometres (4.97 mi) west of Gunnedah, New South Wales. The site on Blackjack Road covers 26 hectares.

Each year the Land Newspaper conducts The Land Farm Inventor of the Year competition which sees a new group of practical and inventive gadgets being put forward by aspiring inventors.

It has been sponsored by the Commonwealth Bank since the early 1970s, with major sponsor AON coming on board in 2022. The event started in 1973 with the first one being held on the Gunnedah racecourse. Admission is charged at between $15 and $25 per person and parking is free of charge.

== See also ==
- Field days in Australia
- National Agricultural Fieldays
- Trade fair
