= Royal New Zealand Show =

Agricultural show

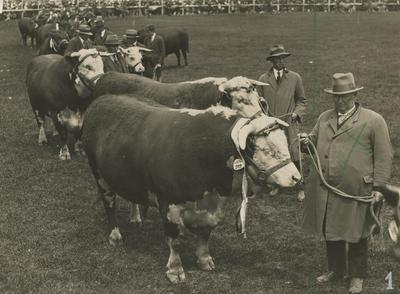
The second Royal Show in Christchurch, 1925

The Royal New Zealand Show, first held in 1924, is an annual agricultural show held by the Royal Agricultural Society of New Zealand, an umbrella organisation for agricultural and pastoral associations in New Zealand. The show was formerly held in rotation at Palmerston North, Hawke's Bay, Hamilton, Invercargill and Christchurch. Starting in 2006, the show was hosted by the Canterbury Agricultural and Pastoral Association at the Canterbury Agricultural Park in Christchurch; this ended after the 2010 show. The show returned to Canterbury in 2025. A maximum of two Royal Shows can be held in New Zealand each year, one in each island.

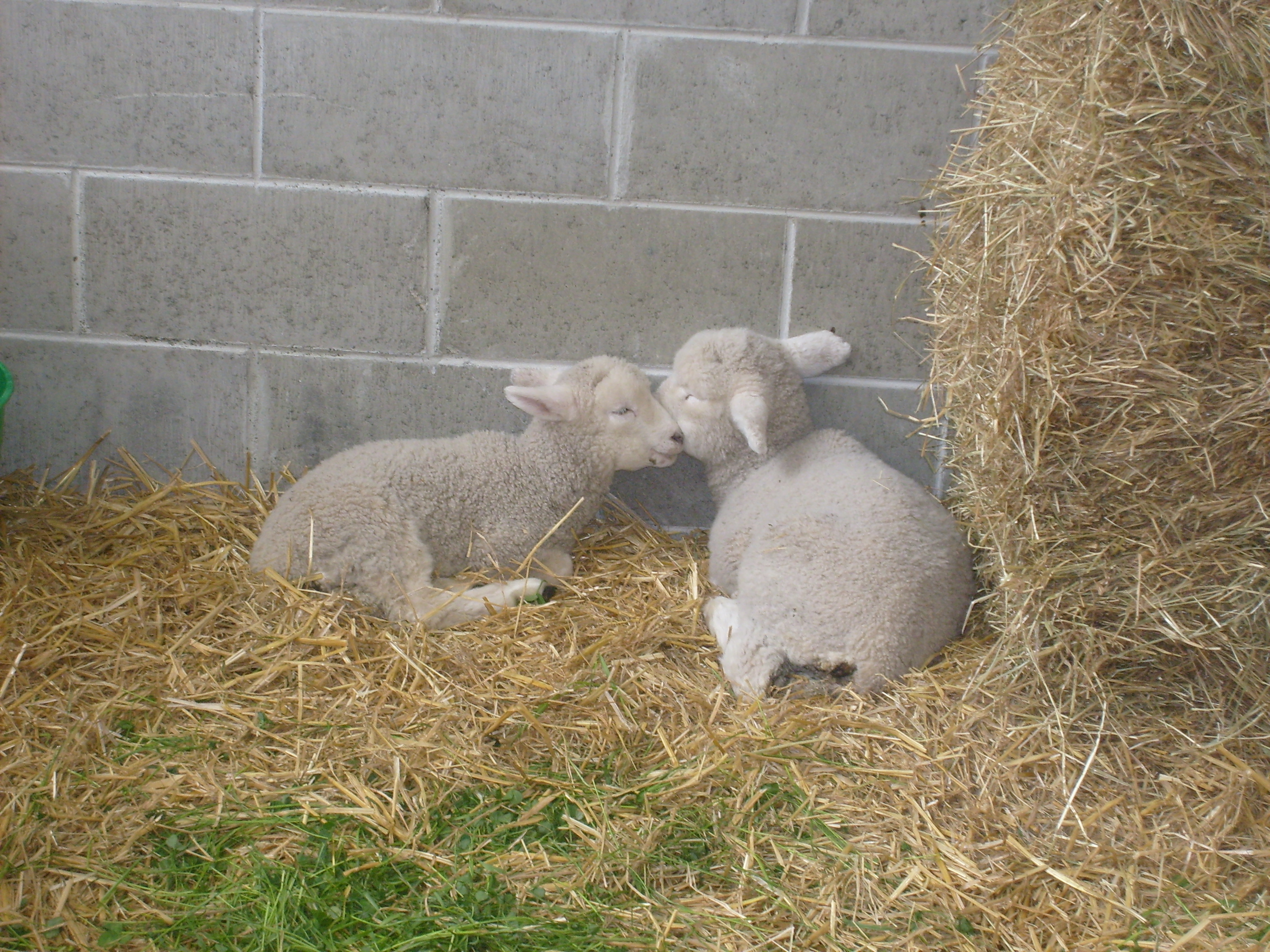
Two sheep at the 2007 Royal New Zealand show, in Christchurch.

== See also ==
- Agricultural show
- Agriculture in New Zealand
