= The Royal Cheshire County Show =

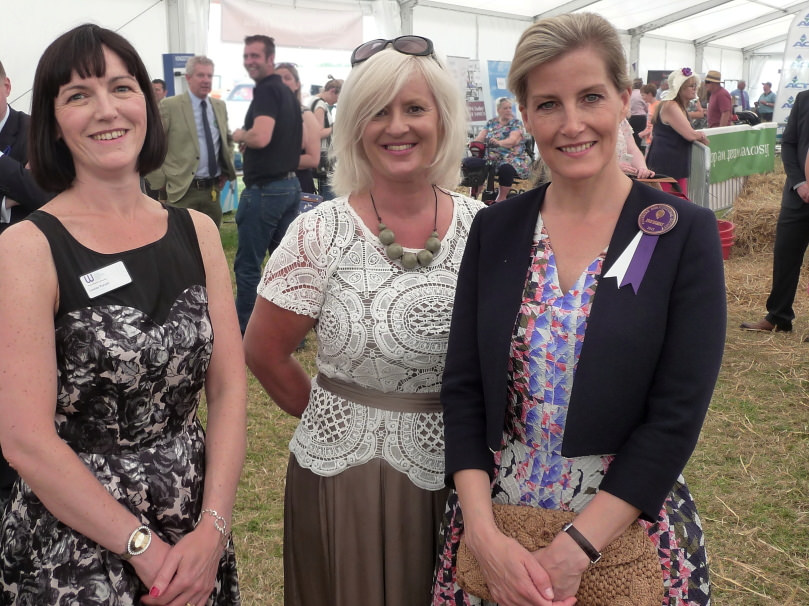
The Countess of Wessex attending the show in 2015

The Royal Cheshire County Show (simply referred to as 'Royal Cheshire County Show' and 'Royal Cheshire Show', and formerly Cheshire County Show) is a county agricultural show that is held on two days in June each year on land west of Flittogate Lane in the Tabley area in Cheshire, England. The show is organised by the Cheshire Agricultural Society, and marked its 175th anniversary in 2013 with 80,000 visitors expected. In January 2016, it became The Royal Cheshire County Show.

== History ==
The Cheshire Agricultural Society was founded in 1838 by Stapleton Cotton, 1st Viscount Combermere and fellow Cheshire landowners, with the stated mission "To promote agriculture and encourage the industrious and moral habits of the labouring portion of the community." The society organised exhibitions and competitions for farms to participate in. The Cheshire Show was first held at the Roodee in Chester in 1893. It amalgamated with the Chester Show in 1904 and returned to the Roodee for the next 50 years.

The show had outgrown the Roodee by 1955, and relocated to Hooton Park near Ellesmere Port in the years that followed. The show began to struggle by the 1970s, but was revived in mid-Cheshire in 1977 after three years of not being held. After several years at Tatton Park, the show moved to its current Tabley showground in 1990.

In 2001, the show was cancelled for only the second time in its history due to the national outbreak of foot-and-mouth disease that affected nearby Little Leigh. 19 years later, the COVID-19 pandemic caused their third cancellation; though some events went virtual.

The show attracts Royal involvement, with Princess Anne becoming the first Lady President of the show in 1999. She reprised her role for the 2013 show, and visited the showground on the second day.

== Attractions ==
Thousands of horses, dogs, cattle, sheep, goats, poultry, pigeons and rabbits are involved in competitions in hundreds of classes. With more than 3500 horses taking part, it is the largest light horse section at any county show in the country.

Local farm produce including cheeses, meats and homemade preserves are exhibited, with a farmers' market, Women's Institute marquee and floral displays.

Other attractions include country pursuits such as falconry, ferreting and clay pigeon shooting as well as demonstrations of cookery and dry stone walling and a motorcycle display team.

Notable attendees have included the botanist David Bellamy and racehorse trainers Ginger McCain and Jenny Pitman.

== See also ==
- History of agriculture in Cheshire
- International Cheese Awards (formerly Nantwich Cheese Show)
