= History of Cheshire =

Badge of the Cheshire coat of arms

The history of Cheshire can be traced back to the Hoxnian Interglacial, between 400,000 and 380,000 years BP. Primitive tools that date to that period have been found. Stone Age remains have been found showing more permanent habitation during the Neolithic period, and by the Iron Age the area is known to have been occupied by the Celtic Cornovii tribe and possibly the Deceangli.

The Romans occupied Cheshire for almost 400 years, from 70 AD, and created the town and fort of Deva Victrix, now Chester. After the Romans withdrew, Cheshire formed part of Mercia, an Anglo-Saxon kingdom, that saw invasions from the Welsh and Danes. The Norman Conquest in 1070 saw Cheshire harshly ruled by the occupiers. Local people resented the invaders and rebelled. War again swept the county during the English Civil War in 1642, despite an attempt by local gentry to keep the county neutral.

The Industrial Revolution saw population changes in Cheshire as farm workers moved to the factories of Manchester and Lancashire. In the 18th and 19th centuries there was a resurgence in the country houses of Cheshire and canals and railways were built.

Contemporary Cheshire is now a ceremonial county administered by four unitary authorities; Cheshire East, Cheshire West and Chester, Halton, and Warrington. (Warrington, formerly in Lancashire, was added to Cheshire in 1974.) Cheshire retains the offices of Lord Lieutenant and High Sheriff for ceremonial purposes.

== Toponymy ==
Cheshire's name was originally derived from an early name for Chester, and was first recorded as Legeceasterscir in the Anglo-Saxon Chronicle, meaning the shire of the city of legions. Although the name first appears in 980, it is thought that the county was created by Edward the Elder around 920. In the Domesday Book, Chester was recorded as having the name Cestrescir (Chestershire), derived from the name for Chester at the time. A series of changes that occurred as English itself changed, together with some simplifications and elision, resulted in the name Cheshire, as it occurs today.

== Prehistory ==
Cheshire periodically lay under ice until the end of the Younger Dryas ice age about 11,500 years ago. However, primitive tools have been found that date to the Hoxnian Interglacial, between 400,000 and 380,000 years BP, showing that Cheshire was inhabited at that time, probably by Homo heidelbergensis.

There is evidence of Old Stone Age (Paleolithic) occupation with axe heads being found at Tatton dating to 10,000 B.C.

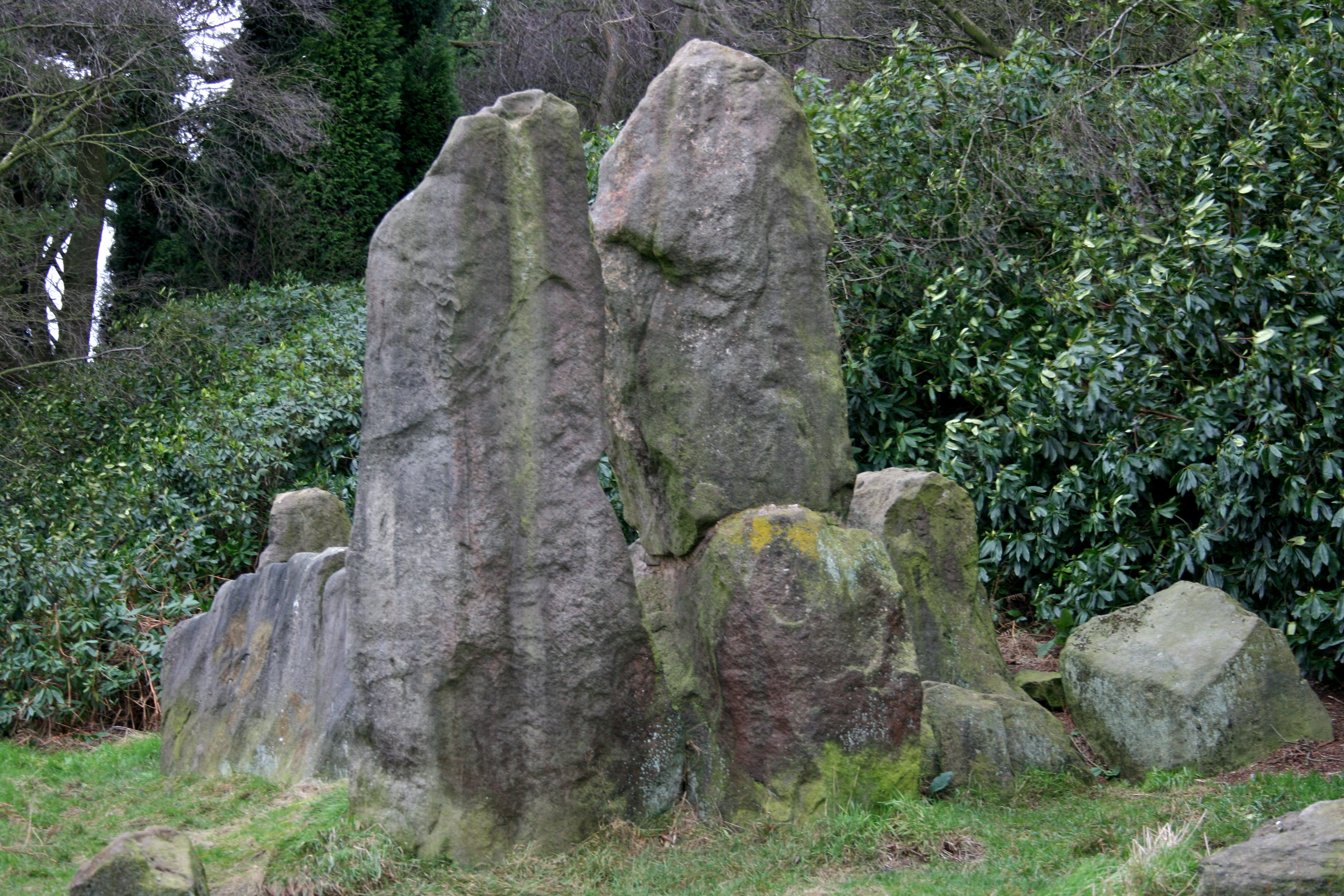
The Bridestones

More permanent occupation of Cheshire occurred during the New Stone Age (Neolithic). For example, there is a chambered tomb known as the Bridestones, near Congleton. It belongs to the "megalithic culture" characterised by the practice of collective burial in stone-built chambers beneath mounds of earth and stone. It lies approximately three miles east of Congleton and is the oldest megalithic structure in the whole of Cheshire. Farming is also likely to have started to develop during the Neolithic period, with flint artefacts and burnt grain being found at Tatton dating to 2,600 B.C., and the Oversley Farm find.

During Bronze Age, occupation of upland hill sites at Beeston Castle and Eddisbury hill fort suggested a move to a more military society.

Into the Iron Age, Cheshire became occupied by the Celtic Cornovii, bordering the Brigantes to the North and the Deceangli and Ordovices to the West. The Cornovii tribe had their capital at The Wrekin, Shropshire and were known to trade in salt from mines at Middlewich and Northwich.

For the important Oversley Farm (near Manchester Airport) neolithic and Bronze Age longhouse find, see Oversleyford#Oversley Farm.

== Roman ==
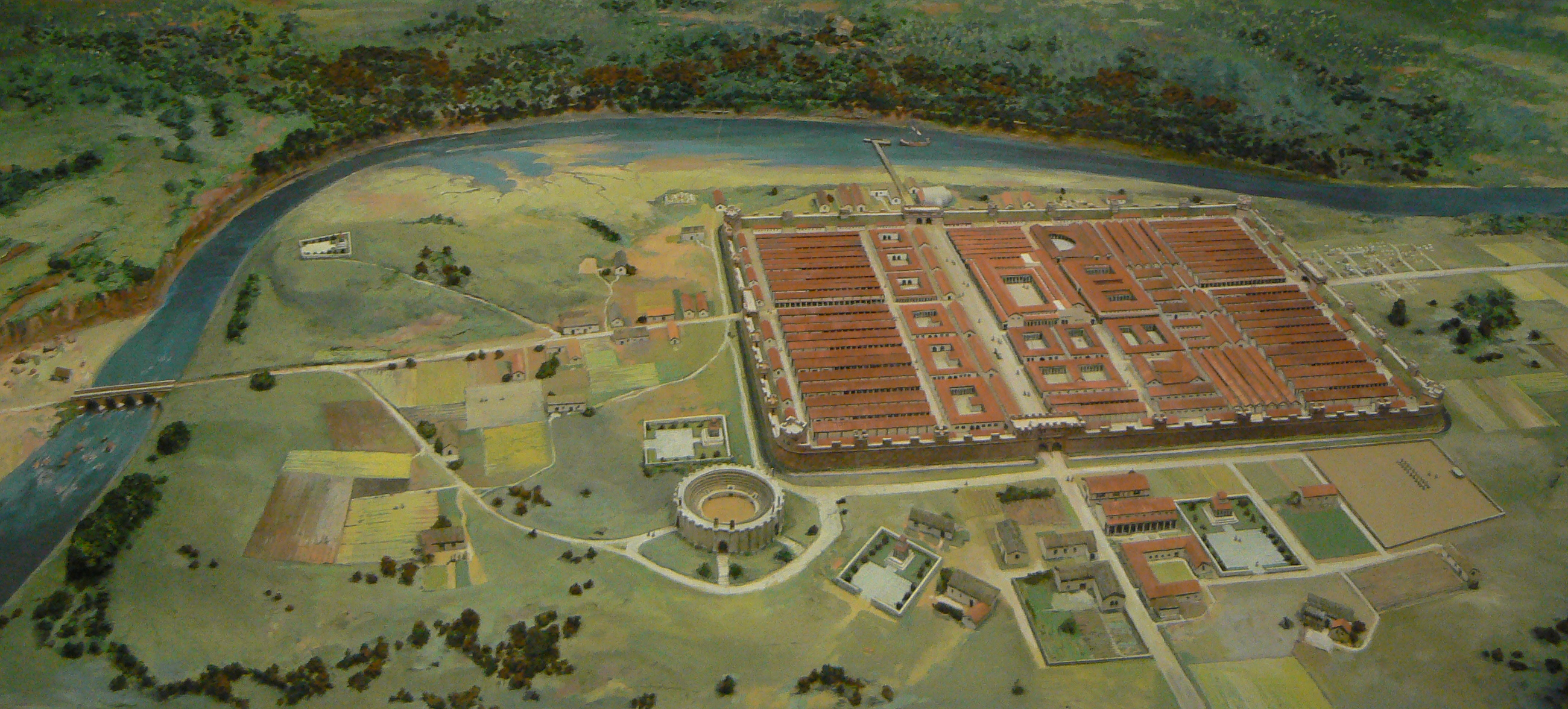
Model of how Deva Victrix would probably have looked.

The Romans arrived in the lands of the Cornovii in 48 AD and defeated them at a battle at The Wrekin. By 70 AD the Romans had founded the fortress and town of Deva Victrix, now Chester, according to ancient cartographer Ptolemy, The fortress was 20% larger than other fortresses in Britannia built around the same time at York (Eboracum) and Caerleon (Isca Augusta); this has led to the suggestion that the fortress, rather than London (Londinium), was intended to become the capital of the Roman province of Britannia Superior. The civilian amphitheatre, which was built in the 1st century, could seat between 8,000 and 10,000 people. It is the largest known military amphitheatre in Britain, and is also a Scheduled Monument.

The Romans developed the settlements at Condate (Northwich) and Salinae (Middlewich) due to the importance as their salt mines Salt was very important in Roman society; and highly valued by the Roman occupation forces. Other Roman industries included smelting of lead at Runcorn and potteries at Wilderspool, though the county retained most of its rural character and native Britons tended more towards agriculture than industry.

Chester was garrisoned by the legion until at least the late 4th century. Although the army had abandoned the fortress by 410 when the Romans retreated from Britannia, the civilian settlement continued (probably with some Roman veterans staying behind with their wives and children) and its occupants probably continued to use the fortress and its defences as protection from raiders from the Irish Sea.

== Mercian ==
The Roman Empire fell in the 5th century, and the Romano-British established a number of petty kingdoms in its place. The region was on the boundary of Northumbria, Mercia and north Wales so turbulent times continued. In 616, Æthelfrith of Northumbria defeated armies from the kingdoms of Powys and Gwynedd at the Battle of Chester and probably established the Anglo-Saxon position in the area from then on.

Later in the 7th century, Cheshire formed part of the kingdom of Mercia. However, with increased invasions from Danes, the Anglo-Saxons extended and strengthened the walls of Chester for protection. Chester was the centre of several battles between the English and Danes until eventually King Alfred, of Wessex and eventually Mercia, drove them away from the city in 894–895 and a peace treaty was agreed granting the Danes settlements in the Wirral, which can be seen by their Danish place names, such as Thingwall (from thing meaning 'a meeting place').

Alfred's daughter Ethelfleda, Lady of the Mercians, built the new Anglo-Saxon 'burh' at Chester.

By the middle of the 7th century, Christianity had also become widespread, and one of the earliest churches was at Eccleston. Eccleston shows signs of Christian burials as early as 390 AD, the earliest known Christian burials in Cheshire. Towards the end of the 7th century, Saint Werburgh founded a religious institution on the present site of Chester's St John's Church which later became the first cathedral.

By this time, the River Mersey is likely to have formed the natural boundary between Mercia and Northumbria. The threat was now from the Danish kingdom based at York, so the Mercian kingdom built a fort at Eddisbury in 914 to serve as a defence for Chester. All along the length of the River Mersey as far as Manchester, fortified defensive settlements were created, including Rhuddlan, Runcorn, Thelwall, Bakewell and Penwortham.

During his reign of Edward the Elder parts of old Derbyshire were also added to the Mercian kingdom. These are now modern-day Longdendale and Macclesfield. By 930, relative peace reigned across the area until the Norman occupation.

In 973, the Anglo Saxon Chronicle records that, two years after his coronation at Bath, King Edgar of England, came to Chester where he held his court in a palace in a place now known as Edgar's field near the old Dee bridge in Handbridge. After the kings swore fealty and allegiance they rowed him back to the palace. As he entered he is reported to have said that with so many kings' allegiance his successors could boast themselves to be kings of the English.

Chester became headquarters of Eadric Streona in 1007, the King's ealdorman of Cheshire, Staffordshire and Shropshire. This transferred to the governorship of the Earl of Mercia: firstly Leofric (c. 1030–1057); then Ælfgar (1057–1062); and finally Edwin (1062–1070).

Mercian place names can be seen throughout the county. They can be recognised by the suffix 'ham' (from the Saxon word 'hamm' meaning a settlement)-for example Frodsham, Eastham, Weaverham; and 'burgh' or 'bury' (meaning a fortified settlement or stronghold) such as Wrenbury and Prestbury.

== Norman ==
William I led the Norman Conquest of England in 1066. Confiscation of lands by the conquerors led to resistance and dissent for many years, and Cheshire, as a remote part of the kingdom, provided the Normans with stiff resistance. This led the Normans to treat Cheshire particularly harshly with land and villages being destroyed, crops burned and people made homeless.

In 1069 the final attempt at resistance was finally put down and Edwin and other Saxon landlords had their property confiscated and their land was passed to Norman lords. Edwin attempted another rebellion in 1071, but was betrayed and killed.

Proof of the devastation can be seen from the Domesday survey of 1086 most of the lands in Cheshire were recorded as "wasta", or wasteland, as "abandoned or useless lands". Prior to the conquest the lands had been fertile. Chester was sieged in 1070 and eventually sacked, largely demolished and devastated.

With control of the county, William built a castle in Chester at a defensive location overlooking the River Dee from where it could dominate and control the city and therefore administer the county. The old Roman walls were repaired making Chester probably one of the most heavily defended cities in Britain at that time.

Coat of arms of Hugh d'Avranches

William abolished the Earldom of Mercia and created a new Earldom of Chester. William made Hugh d'Avranches the first Earl. Hugh was nicknamed Hugh Lupus, or wolf, and ruled almost autonomously and with the full authority of the King. Cheshire was therefore declared a County palatine, a title it still holds today.

The county continued to be ruled and administered by Norman earls and they imposed their own courts of law, civil service and independent powers, until the 7th Earl, John, died without a male heir in 1237. By that time King Henry III had declared the female line of inheritance to be invalid and took back the title, passing it to his son, Prince Edward - later to become King Edward I. Ever since that time the eldest son of all English monarchs has held the title of Earl of Chester and the title was created in conjunction with the Prince of Wales. By the 13th century, so important were the city and castle at Chester regarded, that extensions were built to include a royal apartment for King Edward I during the various wars with the neighbouring Welsh.

Many other Norman castles were subsequently constructed throughout the county of Cheshire in order to maintain the peace and to exert control over the disenchanted population of the region who bitterly hated their Norman overseers for many generations.

Hundreds of Cheshire in Domesday Book. Areas highlighted in pink now principally Flintshire.

The Cheshire of 1086, as recorded in the Domesday Book, was a larger county than it is today. With minor variations in spelling across sources, the complete list of hundreds of Cheshire at this time are: Atiscross, Bochelau, Chester, Dudestan, Exestan, Hamestan, Middlewich, Riseton, Roelau, Tunendune, Warmundestrou and Wilaveston.

It included two hundreds, Atiscross and Exestan, that later became part of North Wales, now principally Flintshire. At the time of the Domesday Book, it also included as part of Duddestan Hundred the area of land later known as Maelor Saesneg (which used to be a detached part of Flintshire). The area in between the Mersey and Ribble (referred to in the Domesday Book as "Inter Ripam et Mersam") formed part of the returns for Cheshire. Although this has been interpreted to mean that at that time south Lancashire was part of Cheshire, more exhaustive research indicates that the boundary between Cheshire and what was to become Lancashire remained the River Mersey.

This period of uncertainty of the northern border lasted until 1182, when the land north of the Mersey became administered as part of the new county of Lancashire. Later, the hundreds of Atiscross and Exestan became part of Wales. Over the years the remaining ten hundreds consolidated to just seven with changed names: Broxton, Bucklow, Eddisbury, Macclesfield, Nantwich, Northwich, and Wirral.

Markets had existed in Chester, Middlewich and Nantwich well before 1066, and the suffix "port" (meaning "market") suggests the likelihood in pre-Norman markets at towns like Stockport. However the 12th and 13th centuries saw an escalation of towns being granted market rights, probably as the local population grew more used to Norman rule. Aldford and Alderley markets were created in 1253; Macclesfield in 1261; Congleton in 1272 and Over in 1280. However competition was fierce and markets are known to have failed at Aldford, Coddington, Brereton and Burton before the start of the 14th century.

In 1397 the county had lands in the march of Wales added to its territory, and was promoted to the rank of principality. This was because of the support the men of the county had given to King Richard II, in particular by his standing armed force of about 500 men called the "Cheshire Guard". As a result, the King's title was changed to "King of England and France, Lord of Ireland, and Prince of Chester". No other English county has been honoured in this way, although it lost the distinction on Richard's fall in 1399.

== 17th century ==
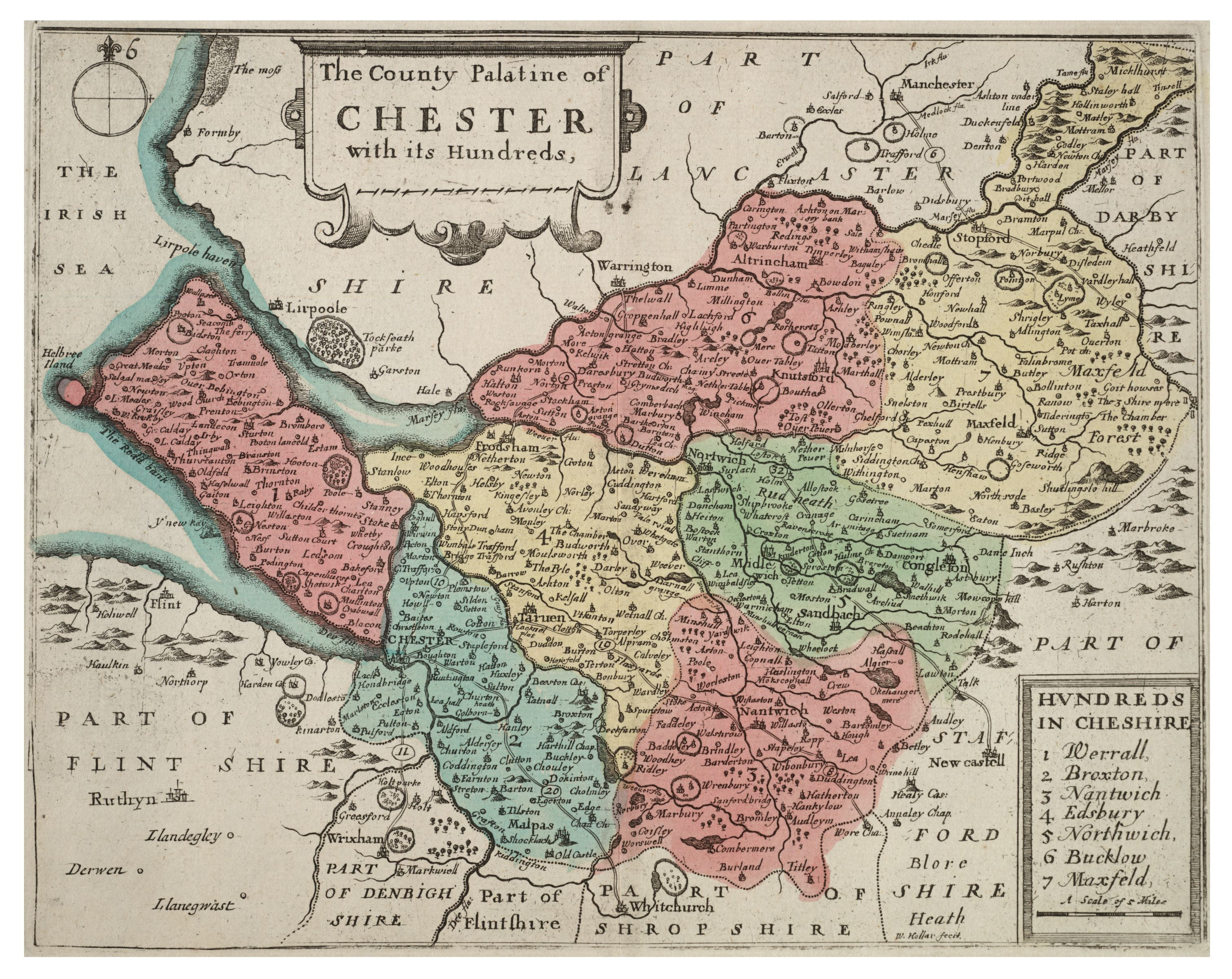
Map of Cheshire showing the hundreds by Wenceslas Hollar (1607–1677)

By the early 17th century, Cheshire had established its own gentry descended from the Normans stock. These families dominated trade, legal and community affairs and of course dominated land ownership.

However, the outbreak of the English Civil War in 1642 changed this. People aligned with either the Royalist or Parliamentarian causes regardless of social status, but more due to their own conscience. Chester was a Royalist stronghold, while the market towns of Stockport, Knutsford, Nantwich, Congleton, Middlewich and Northwich remained in Parliamentarian hands. After initial skirmishes in 1642, there was an attempt by Cheshire gentry to keep the county neutral during the civil war. The Bunbury Agreement was agreed locally, but the strategic position of Cheshire and the port of Chester meant that national commanders could never accept the local neutrality and the forces ended up clashing in the First Battle of Middlewich in March 1643. The county saw many battles fought on its lands — notably, the sieges of Nantwich and Chester.

In August 1655, England was placed under military rule and Cheshire, Lancashire and North Staffordshire were governed by Charles Worsley. Riots were planned, even by Parliamentarians, notably Sir George Booth of Dunham Massey near Altrincham, though these were quashed and the leaders executed. Eventually military rule ended in 1658 and the monarchy was restored with King Charles II of England.

In 1689, Henry, Duke of Norfolk, raised a regiment on the little Roodee in Chester in an effort to resist any attempt by James II to re-take the English throne. This regiment became the Cheshire Regiment and now forms part of the 1st Battalion, The Mercian Regiment (Cheshire).

== 18th and 19th centuries ==
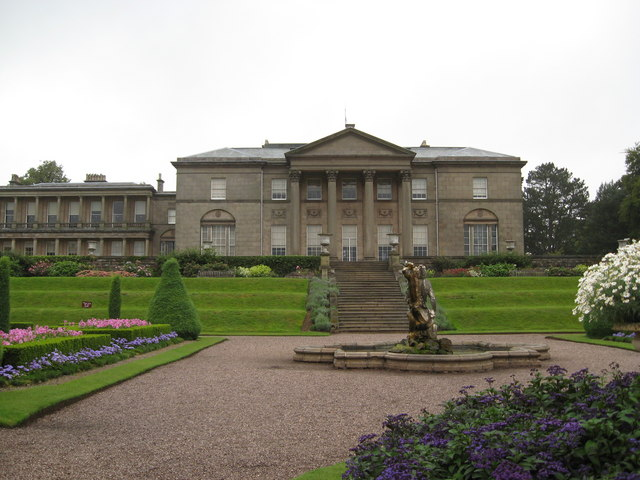
Tatton Hall

At the end of the 18th century, land enclosure and district reorganisations took place. As well as local industries, industrialisation of the Lancashire and Manchester mill towns saw Cheshire farms abandoned as workers sought a better living in the industrial towns. These lands were absorbed into bigger estates culminating in 98% of Cheshire land belonging to only 26% of the population. For example, by 1870 Peckforton Castle was over 25,000 acres (100 km^{2}).

However, industrialisation also bought benefits to Cheshire. The completion of the Trent and Mersey Canal in 1777 and innovations such as the Anderton Boat Lift, allowed Cheshire cheese and salt to become major county exports. Also the silk industry was developing in Macclesfield, triggered by Charles Roe building a watermill in Macclesfield in 1744.

Cheshire continued to develop into a wealthy county in the 19th century. Tatton Hall and Dunham Massey are examples of country houses developed during the period. The Egerton family extensively remodelled Tatton Hall between 1760 and 1820, and the 17th-century house at Dunham Massey saw significant 19th century development and expansion.

The railways came through Cheshire in the 1830s. The Grand Junction Railway was authorised by Parliament in 1833 and designed by George Stephenson and Joseph Locke. It opened for business on 4 July 1837, running for 82 miles (132 km) from Birmingham through Wolverhampton, Stafford, Crewe, Hartford and Warrington, then via the existing Warrington and Newton Railway to join the Liverpool and Manchester Railway at a triangular junction at Newton Junction. The GJR established its chief engineering works at Crewe, moving there from Edge Hill, in Liverpool.

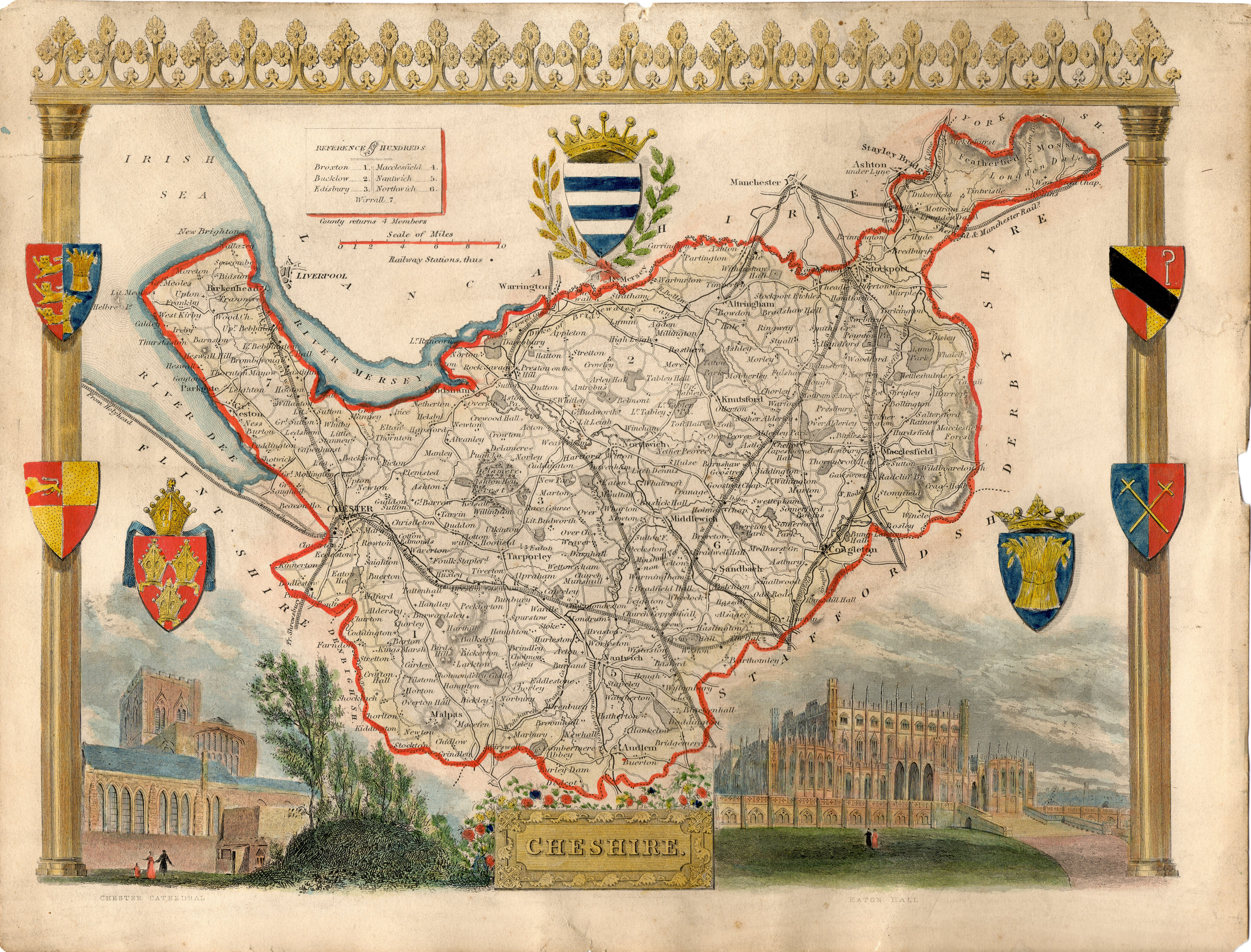
A map of Cheshire, dated 1923, showing the county's full historical extent before areas were lost to the new metropolitan counties in 1974

In 1874, John Brunner and Ludwig Mond founded Brunner Mond in Winnington near Northwich and started manufacturing soda ash using the Solvay ammonia-soda process. This process used salt as a main raw material. The chemical industry used the subsided land for the disposal of waste from the manufacture of soda-ash. The waste was transported through a network of cranes and rails to the produce limebeds. This was a dangerous alkaline substance and caused the landscape to be abandoned as unusable. Bartholomew's Gazetteer of the British Isles (1887) described Cheshire's industry:

The chief rivers are the Mersey with its affluent the Bollin, the Weaver, and the Dee. The soil consists of marl, mixed with clay and sand, and is generally fertile. There are numerous excellent dairy farms, on which the celebrated Cheshire cheese is made; also extensive market gardens, the produce of which is sent to Liverpool, Manchester, and the neighbouring towns. Salt has been long worked; it is obtained from rock salt and saline springs; the principal works are at Nantwich, Northwich, and Winsford. Coal and ironstone are worked in the districts of Macclesfield and Stockport. There are manufacturers of cotton, silk, and ribbons, carried on chiefly in the towns of the East division; and shipbuilding, on the Mersey.

The 19th century also saw the creation of formal civic organisations in Cheshire. Cheshire Constabulary was founded in 1857 and Cheshire County Council was created in 1889.

== 20th and 21st centuries ==
Through the Local Government Act 1972, which came into effect on 1 April 1974, some areas in the north-west became part of the metropolitan counties of Greater Manchester and Merseyside. Stockport (previously a county borough), Hyde, Dukinfield and Stalybridge in the north-east became part of Greater Manchester. Much of the Wirral Peninsula in the north-west, including the county boroughs of Birkenhead and Wallasey, joined Merseyside. At the same time the Tintwistle Rural District was transferred to Derbyshire. The area of Lancashire south of the Merseyside/Greater Manchester area, including Widnes and the county borough of Warrington, was added to the new non-metropolitan county of Cheshire.

Halton and Warrington became unitary authorities independent of Cheshire County Council on 1 April 1998, but remain part of Cheshire for ceremonial purposes and also for fire and policing.

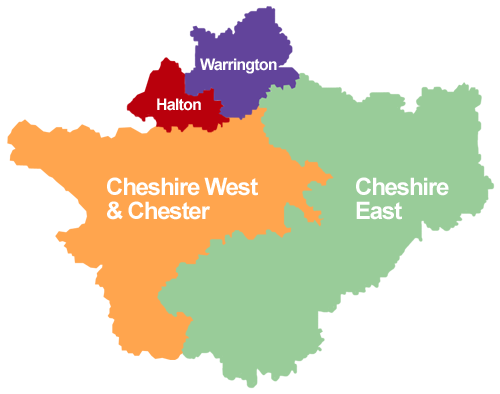
Four unitary authorities of Cheshire

A referendum for a further local government reform connected with an elected regional assembly was planned for 2004, but was abandoned – see Northern England referendum, 2004.

As part of the local government restructuring in April 2009, Cheshire County Council and the Cheshire districts were abolished and replaced by two new unitary authorities, Cheshire East and Cheshire West and Chester. The existing unitary authorities of Halton and Warrington were not affected by the change.

Cheshire is now a ceremonial county administered by four unitary authorities; Cheshire East, Cheshire West and Chester, Halton, and Warrington. Cheshire retains the offices of Lord Lieutenant and High Sheriff for ceremonial purposes under the Lieutenancies Act 1997. Policing and fire and rescue services continue to be provided across all four areas together, with the Cheshire Police Authority and Cheshire Fire Authority consisting of members of the four councils.

The boundary of the Church of England Diocese of Chester follows most closely the pre-1974 county boundary of Cheshire, so it includes all of Wirral, Stockport, and the Cheshire panhandle that included Tintwistle Rural District council area. In terms of Roman Catholic church administration, most of Cheshire falls into the Roman Catholic Diocese of Shrewsbury.

== See also ==
- Cheshire Archives and Local Studies Service
- Chetham Society
- Lancashire and Cheshire Antiquarian Society
- History of agriculture in Cheshire
- Record Society of Lancashire and Cheshire

== Notes and references ==
=== Bibliography ===
==== Series ====
- The Victoria History of the County of Chester
  - Harris, B. E.; Thacker, A. T. (1987). The Victoria History of the County of Chester. (Volume 1: Physique, Prehistory, Roman, Anglo-Saxon, and Domesday). Oxford: Oxford University Press. ISBN 0-19-722761-9.
  - Harris, B. E. (1979). The Victoria History of the County of Chester. (Volume 2). Oxford: Oxford University Press. ISBN 0-19-722749-X.
  - Harris, B. E. (1980). The Victoria History of the County of Chester. (Volume 3). Oxford: Oxford University Press. ISBN 0-19-722754-6.
- Cheshire Community Council Series: A History of Cheshire. Series Editor: J. J. Bagley.
  - Varley, W. J. (1964). Cheshire Before the Romans. (Volume 1 of Cheshire Community Council Series: A History of Cheshire. Chester, UK: Cheshire Community Council.
  - Thompson, F. H. (1965). Roman Cheshire. (Volume 2 of Cheshire Community Council Series: A History of Cheshire. Chester, UK: Cheshire Community Council.
  - Bu'Lock, J. D. (1972). Pre-Conquest Cheshire 383-1066. (Volume 3 of Cheshire Community Council Series: A History of Cheshire. Chester, UK: Cheshire Community Council.
  - Husain, B. M. C. (1973). Cheshire Under the Norman Earls 1066–1237. (Volume 4 of Cheshire Community Council Series: A History of Cheshire. Chester, UK: Cheshire Community Council.
  - Hewitt, H. J. (1967). Cheshire Under the Three Edwards. (Volume 5 of Cheshire Community Council Series: A History of Cheshire. Chester, UK: Cheshire Community Council.
  - Driver, J. T. (1971). Cheshire in the Later Middle Ages 1399–1540. (Volume 6 of Cheshire Community Council Series: A History of Cheshire. Chester, UK: Cheshire Community Council.
  - Beck, J. (1969). Tudor Cheshire. (Volume 7 of Cheshire Community Council Series: A History of Cheshire). Chester, UK: Cheshire Community Council.
  - Dore, R. N. (1966). The Civil Wars in Cheshire. (Volume 8 of Cheshire Community Council Series: A History of Cheshire). Chester, UK: Cheshire Community Council.
  - Hodson, J. H. (1978). Cheshire, 1660–1780: Restoration to Industrial Revolution. (Volume 9 of Cheshire Community Council Series: A History of Cheshire). Chester, UK: Cheshire Community Council. ISBN 0-903119-11-0.
  - Scard, G. (1981). Squire and Tenant: Rural Life in Cheshire 1760–1900. (Volume 10 of Cheshire Community Council Series: A History of Cheshire). Chester, UK: Cheshire Community Council. ISBN 0-903119-13-7.
  - Tigwell, R. E. (1985). Cheshire in the Twentieth Century. (Volume 11 of Cheshire Community Council Series: A History of Cheshire). Chester, UK: Cheshire Community Council.

==== Other sources ====
- Carrington, P, ed. (2002). Deva Victrix: Roman Chester Re-assessed. Chester: Chester Archaeological Society. ISBN 0-9507074-9-X.
- Crosby, A. (1996). A History of Cheshire. The Darwen County History Series. Chichester, UK: Phillimore & Co. Ltd. ISBN 0-85033-932-4.
- Earl, A. L. (1990). Middlewich 900-1900. Ravenscroft Publications. ISBN 978-1-873139-01-1.
- Higham, N. J. (1993). The Origins of Cheshire. Manchester, UK: Manchester University Press. ISBN 0-7190-3160-5.
- Mason, David J.P. (2001). Roman Chester: City of the Eagles. Stroud: Tempus Publishing Ltd. ISBN 0-7524-1922-6.
- Morgan, P., ed. (1978). Domesday Book. Volume 26: Cheshire. Chichester, Sussex: Phillmore and Company Limited. ISBN 0-85033-140-4.
- Morgan, V.; Morgan, P. (2004). Prehistoric Cheshire. Ashbourne, Derbyshire: Landmark Publishing Company. ISBN 1-84306-140-6.
- Nevell, Mike (2008). Manchester: The Hidden History. The History Press. ISBN 978-0-7524-4704-9.
- Phillips, A. D. M.; Phillips, C. B., eds. (2002). A New Historical Atlas of Cheshire. Chester, UK: Cheshire County Council and Cheshire Community Council Publications Trust. ISBN 0-904532-46-1.
- Ptolemy (1992). The Geography. Dover Publications Inc. ISBN 0-486-26896-9.
- Scholes, R. (2000). The Towns and Villages of Britain: Cheshire. Wilmslow, Cheshire: Sigma Press. ISBN 1-85058-637-3.
- Starkey, H. F. (1990). Old Runcorn. Halton Borough Council.
- Sylvester, D. (1980) [1971]. A History of Cheshire (The Darwen County History Series.) (Second ed.). London and Chichester, UK: Phillimore & Co. Ltd. ISBN 0-85033-384-9.
- Sylvester., D.; Nulty, G. (1958). The Historical Atlas of Cheshire (Third ed.). Chester, UK: Cheshire Community Council.
- Youngs, F. A. (1991). Guide to the Local Administrative Units of England. (Volume 1: Northern England). London: Royal Historical Society. ISBN 0-86193-127-0.
