= Royal Norfolk Show =

English agricultural show

Logo of the Royal Norfolk Show

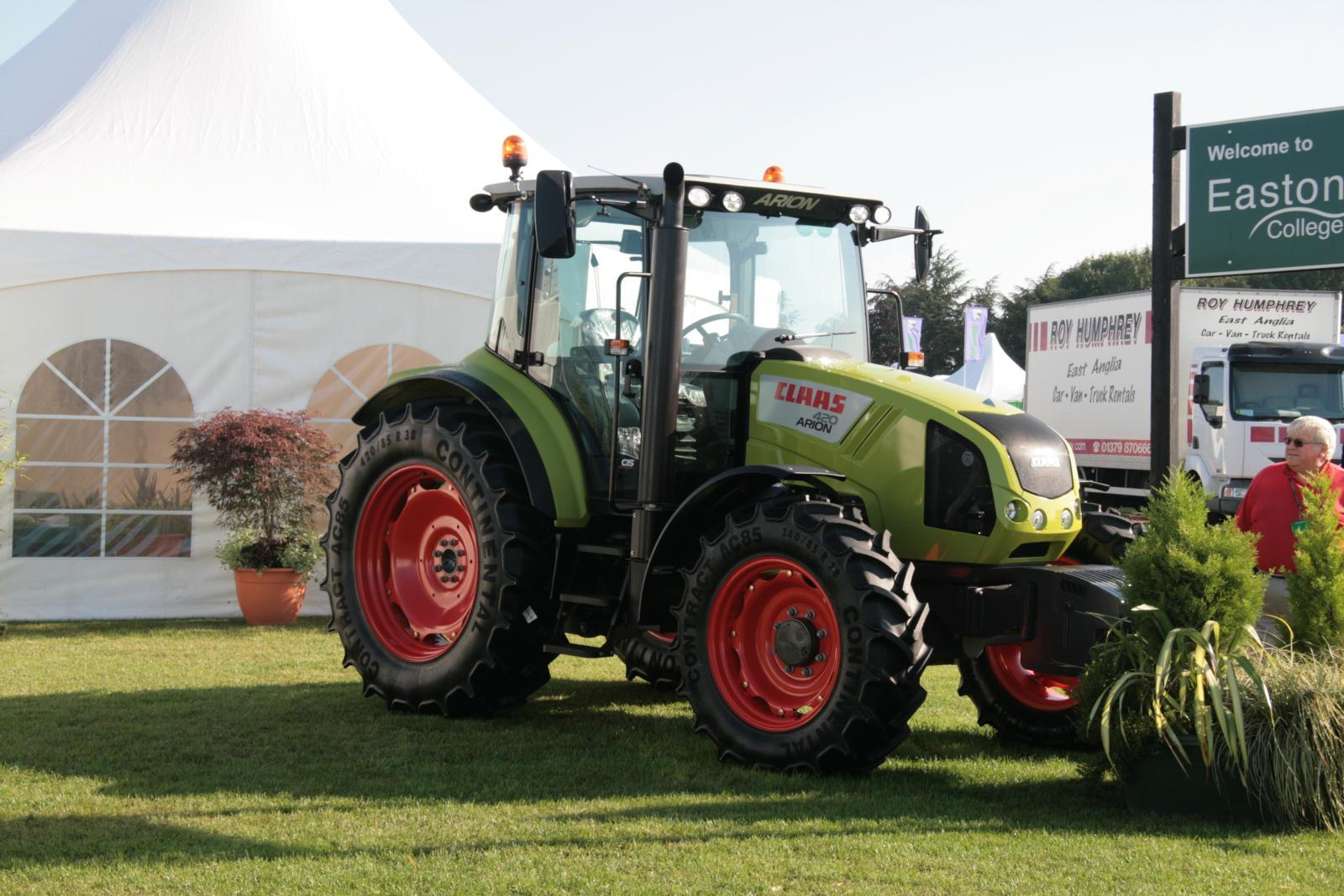
The Claas Arion 420 at the Royal Norfolk Show, 26 June 2011

The Royal Norfolk Show (more simply the Norfolk Show) is an annual agricultural show, and is held by the Royal Norfolk Agricultural Association. It has been held almost every year since 1847. Up until 1953, the show was held at various sites around Norfolk, although it has since been held at a permanent site near Costessey, Norwich, Norfolk. The show tends to be held on the Wednesday and Thursday in week 26 of the year. Attendances tend to be around 90,000 over the two days.

== History ==
The Royal Norfolk Show is an annual agricultural show, and is held by the Royal Norfolk Agricultural Association. In 2014 the president was Prince Edward, now Duke of Edinburgh. In 2024 the Duke was the guest of honour at the show. Danish farmer Poul Hovesen was announced as president of the association in 2024, taking over from Lady Philippa Dannatt, the Lord-Lieutenant of Norfolk.

The Norfolk Show has been held almost every year since 1847. Shows were not held in 1866, 1911, 1934, 1957, 2020 nor 2021. Up until 1953, the show was held at various sites around Norfolk, although it has since been held at a permanent site near Costessey, Norwich, Norfolk. In 2014 the show celebrated its sixtieth anniversary, with the association publishing a commemorative book to mark the occasion.

The show tends to be held on the Wednesday and Thursday in week 26 of the year. The show often benefits from the attendance of members of the royal family.

Attendances tend to be around 90,000 over the two days.

== See also ==
- List of Royal Shows
