= Kentucky Exposition Center =

Large multi-use facility in Louisville, Kentucky

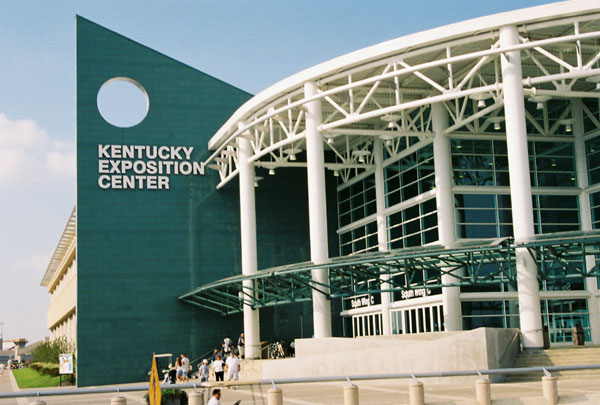
- The main entrance and South Wing of the Kentucky Exposition Center
- Interactive map of Kentucky Exposition Center
- Coordinates: 38°12′0″N 85°44′31″W
- Owner: Kentucky State Fair Board
- Operator: Kentucky State Fair Board

Construction
- Opened: 1956

Website
- www.kyexpo.org

The Kentucky Exposition Center (KEC), is a large multi-use facility in Louisville, Kentucky, United States. Originally built in 1956. It is overseen by the Kentucky Venues and is the sixth largest facility of its type in the U.S., with 1,300,000 square feet (120,000 m^{2}) of indoor space. KEC has two arenas (Broadbent Arena and Freedom Hall), almost 700,000 sq. ft of Class A exhibit space, and nearly 500 acres of outdoor planning space (on grass and concrete). A majority of the 1.3 million square feet is contiguous.

Cardinal Stadium, formerly an on-site baseball/football field with a capacity of up to 37,925, was home to the University of Louisville football and Louisville Redbirds minor league baseball teams. Freedom Hall is one of two on-site arenas, and provided 18,875 seats for the University of Louisville men's and women's basketball teams until they moved downtown to the new KFC Yum! Center for the 2010–11 season. Broadbent Arena is also located within the complex and as has a maximum capacity of 6,600. The site has 1,000 permanent horse stalls, 720 temporary stalls and capacity for livestock as well.

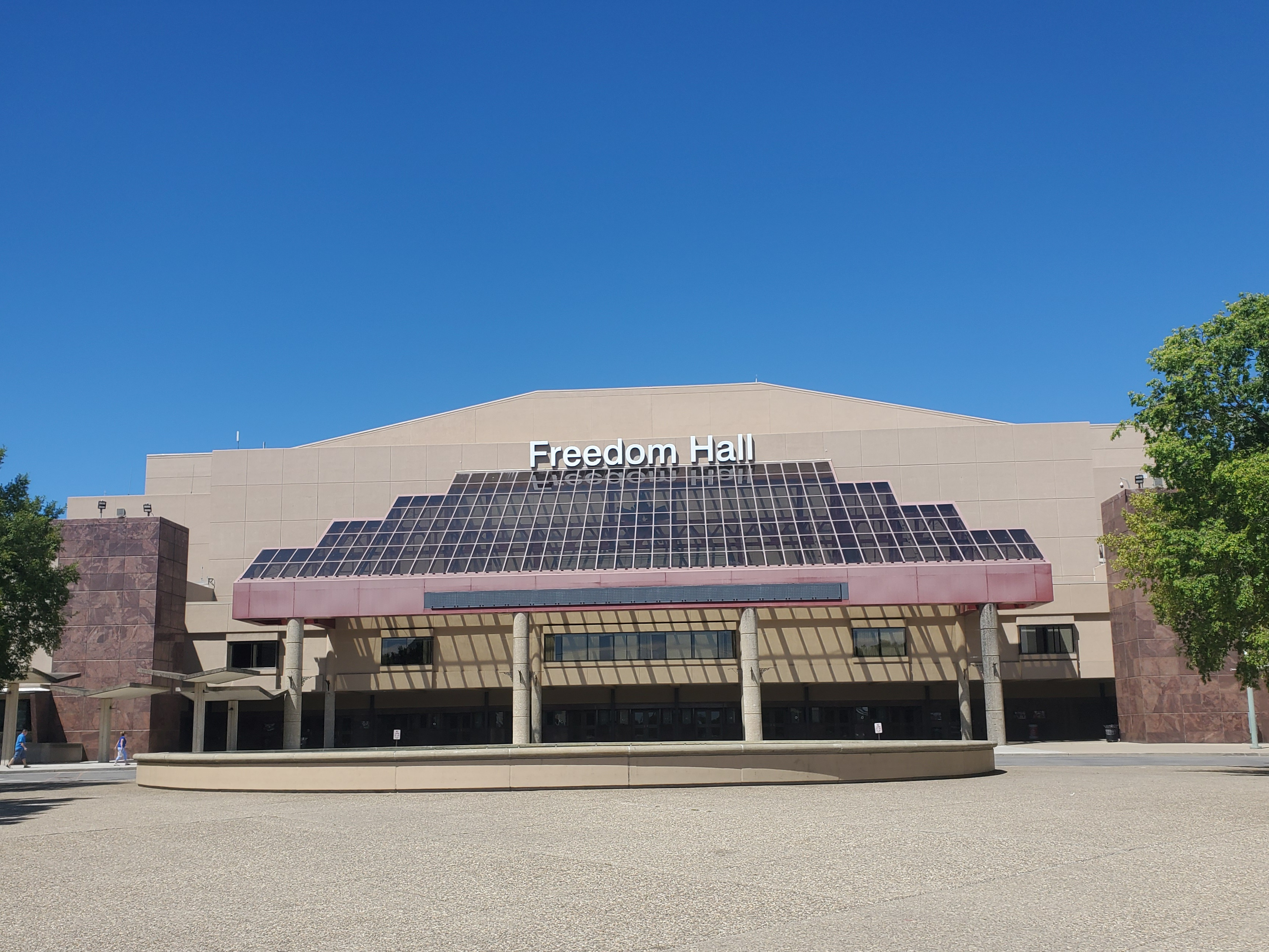
Freedom Hall at the Kentucky Exposition Center

KEC hosts a number of events, including the Kentucky State Fair, the North American International Livestock Exposition, the VEX Robotics World Championships and the National Farm Machinery Show. It is located adjacent to I-65 and the Henry Watterson Expressway, as well as the Louisville International Airport.

Past sporting events held at KEC include six NCAA final Fours, the minor league world series, and the Bluegrass Bowl, a failed attempt to start an annual college football bowl game. The venue was also home to the Fairgrounds Motor Speedway which hosted the ARCA Racing Series and ASA National Tour from 1961 to 1979 including long-running races the International 500 and the Bluegrass 300.

In 2004, Louisville was selected as one of five cities in the United States to host the Dew Tour, an extreme sports franchise that started in 2005. Titled the Panasonic Open, the event was held at the Kentucky Exposition Center from June 8–12. The event returned to Louisville in 2006.

In February 2006 the facility changed its name from Kentucky Fair and Exposition Center to simply Kentucky Exposition Center to "more accurately reflect the facility's mission."

In April 2006, demolition began on KEC's East Wing, which was built as part of the original facility in 1956. It was replaced with the renamed North Wing, a more modern Class "A" exhibition space with higher ceilings and fewer support poles, similar to the South Wing. The new facility, also features a skywalk, allowing those parking in the rear of the facility to access the lobby without going through the new hall. The wing was completed in October 2007 and is currently being used by most events staged at the complex.

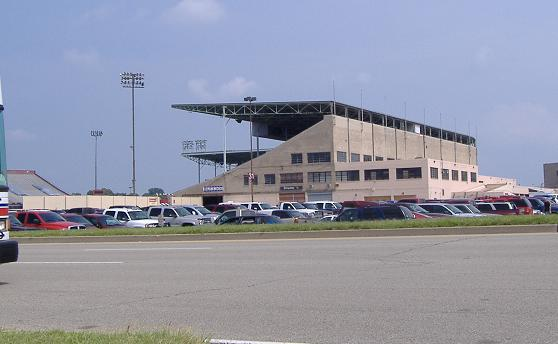
Cardinal Stadium was a multi-purpose stadium that was demolished in 2019
