= Field days in Australia =

Agricultural and equipment display days in Australia

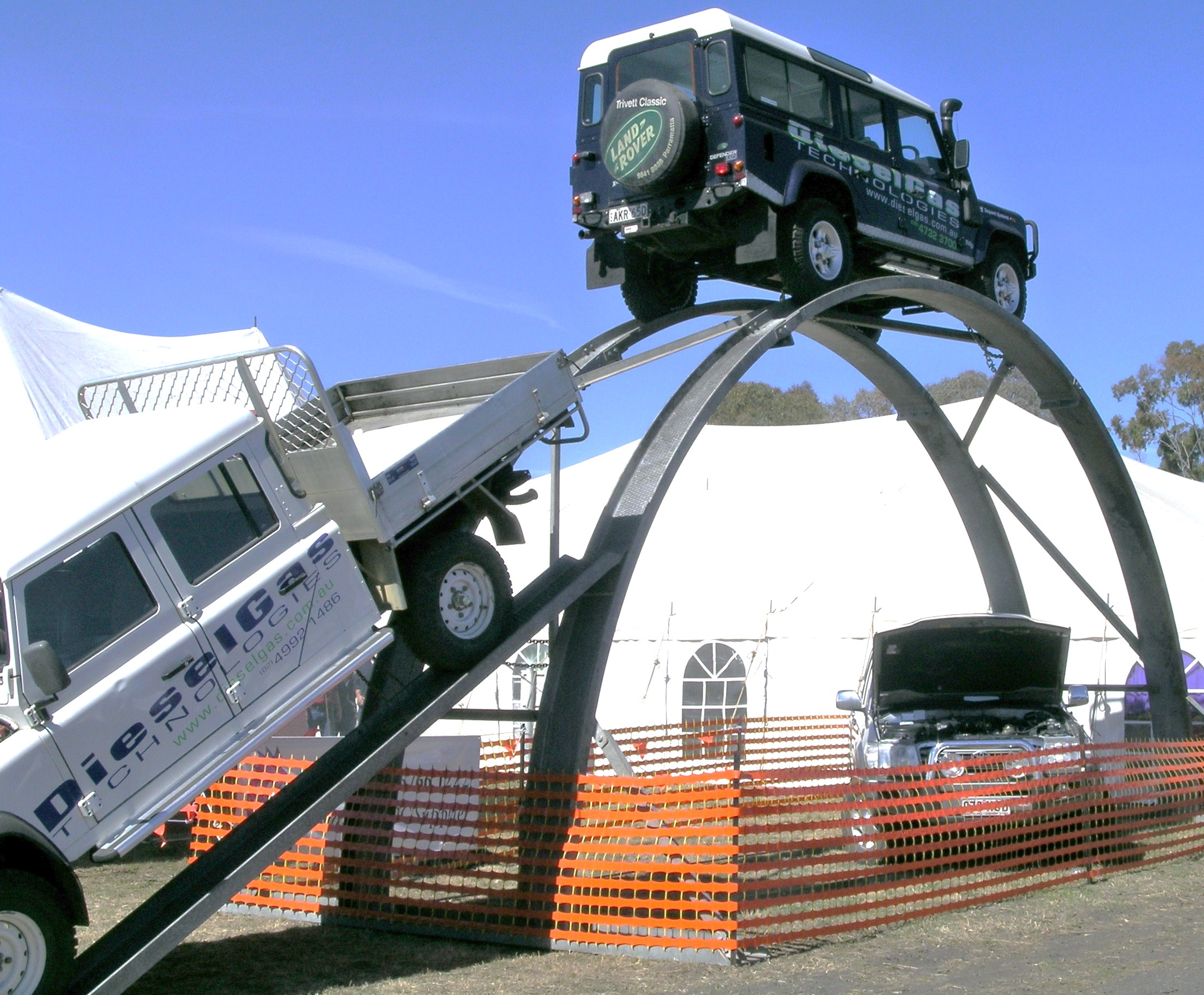
Some exhibitors make a special effort with their displays at AgQuip.

Field days in Australia usually take place as part of an agricultural show, though field days focus on agricultural industry and equipment rather than livestock. A Landcare Australia survey conducted in 1992/93 revealed Australian farmers place a high value on field days.

== New South Wales ==
The Australian National Field Days which began in 1952 is an annual agricultural exhibition held at Orange, New South Wales each year. Field days have been held at Henty since 1963, and are held in the third week of September each year. Over 60,000 people visit over the three-day period Tuesday to Thursday. There are over 600 exhibitors each year, and it is one of the largest in Australia and displays new agricultural equipment and technology for farmers. The event is now held at a permanent all-weather rural exhibition site with broad display avenues including a square kilometre (250 acres) of car parking and an on-site airstrip.

AgQuip, held in August at Gunnedah, attracts over 100,000 visitors. It is sponsored by the Commonwealth Bank, and started in 1973. Murrumbidgee Farm Fair is a Field Day which began in 1988 is held at the Yanco Agricultural Institute in Yanco which is held over two days in May of each year and attracting 15,000 visitors. A field day is held each year at Murrumbateman in October and has about 20,000 visitors. They began in 1979.

== Queensland ==
In Queensland, the largest field days in that state is held in Kingsthorpe near Toowoomba attracting over 60,000 visitors and the event is sponsored by Elders known as Elders FarmFest.

== South Australia ==
The Yorke Peninsula Field Days held every second year at Paskeville are the oldest field days in Australia (dating from 1895) and the largest in South Australia. Other field days are held at Barmera in the Riverland (annually since 1958), Cleve on the Eyre Peninsula and Lucindale in the south east of the state.

== Tasmania ==
The Field days in Tasmania are run by Rural Youth organisation of Tasmania. They are held over three days in May each year at the 0.81-square-kilometre (200-acre) site in Carrick. They had previously been held at a smaller site in Simmons plains. Today Agfest is Tasmania's premier agricultural event, with over 64,000 people attending in 2008.

== Victoria ==
The field days at Elmore commenced in 1964. There is now a permanent site with pavilions, conference rooms and catering facilities which is hired out for events other than the field days which are held in early October. In 2004 there were 45,000 visitors. The Mallee Machinery Field Days are held at Speed and commenced in 1979. The Notman Pasture Seeds Farm Field Days are held at Poowong, Victoria & Walcha and commenced in 1987. The Farm Field Days have been presented some of the most experiences professionals in the fields of pasture, cropping, fertiliser, dairying and economics along with insights into Australia's agriculture industry. In 2014 over 400 local farmers attended the Poowong Farm Field Day with speakers including Andrew Allsop (Notman Pasture Seeds), John Mulvany, Steve Monegetti, David Barry, Matt Hall, Adam Fisher, John Gallienne, and Peter Notman.

== Western Australia ==
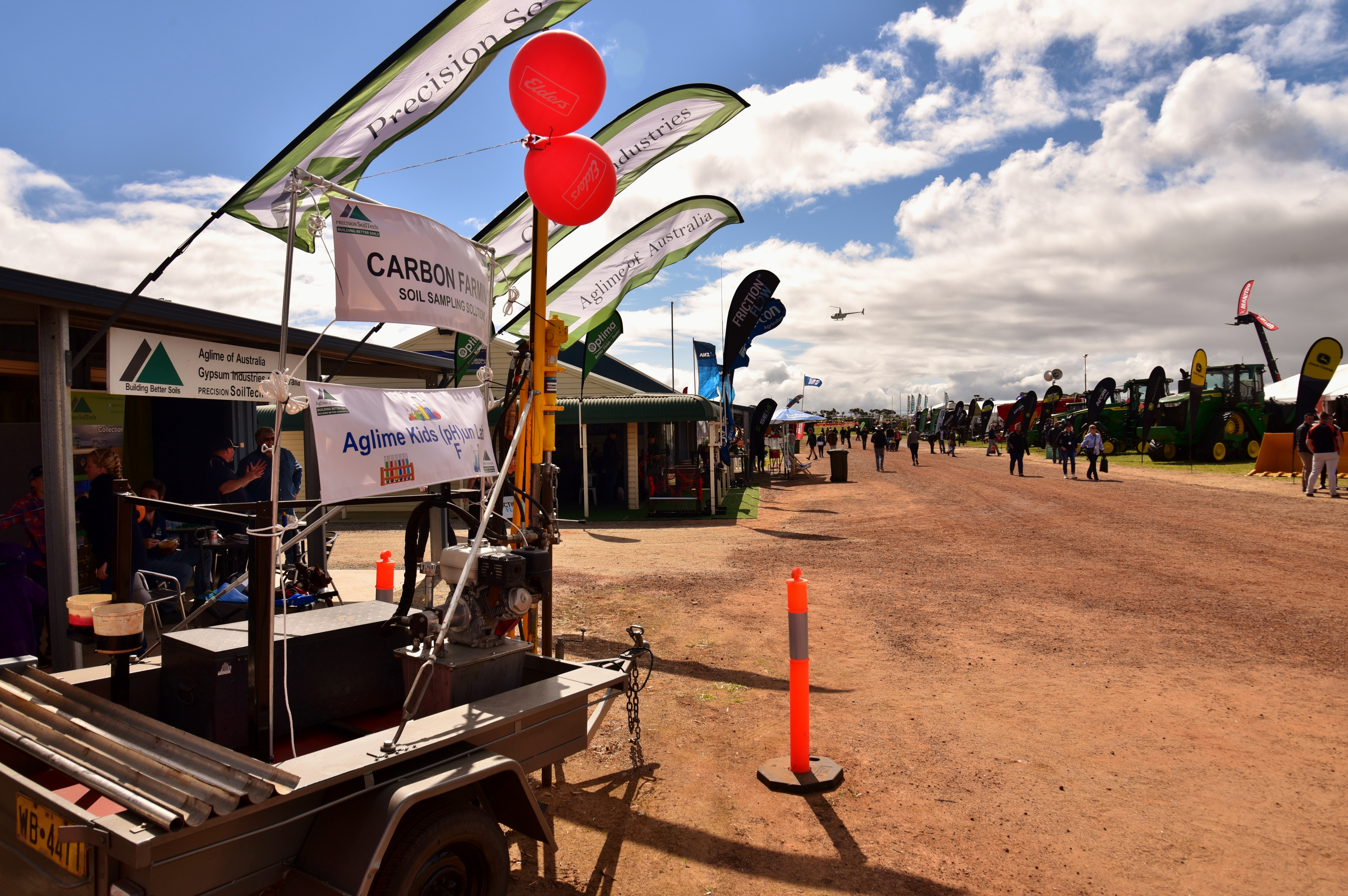
Dowerin Field Days, 2021

For many years, three major field days focusing on grain growing and pastoral farming have been held annually in Western Australia, at Dowerin, Newdegate and Mingenew.

Field days commenced at Dowerin in September 1965; they claim to be the longest established field days in Western Australia. They are now known as the Dowerin GWN Machinery Field Days, naming rights having been granted to regional television broadcaster Golden West Network (GWN) since 1992.

The Dowerin field days are traditionally held on the last Wednesday and Thursday in August each year. Over the two days, the small Dowerin community swells from a population of a few hundred to over 24,000. In 2015, the number of exhibitors reached 700.

In 1973, a machinery field day was held for the first time in Newdegate. Ten years later, in 1983, the organisers announced that that event would be expanded to cover two days. Also in 1983, the inaugural Mingenew Rural Exposition was held.

As of 2019, the three events, known as the Dowerin GWN7 Machinery Field Days, the Newdegate Machinery Field Days, and the Mingenew Midwest Expo, respectively, were being held over a two day period in August or early September each year.

In 1997, the Margaret River Wine Industry Field Day (now known as the Landmark Wine Industry Field Day) was first held with 80 exhibitors, showcasing the latest viticultural and oenological technology. Since that time it has changed to a biennial event and grown to over 200 exhibitors. It is held in Cowaramup.

== See also ==
- Club Days
