= North Devon Show =

Annual agricultural show in Devon, England

The North Devon Show is an annual one-day agricultural show in Devon, England, organised by the North Devon Agricultural Society. It has been held since 1966, currently at Umberleigh Barton Farm at Umberleigh. The show includes animal and vehicle exhibitions, displays of local produce, agricultural trade stands and a fairground, among other attractions. In 2016, it attracted an estimated 20,000 visitors and is the biggest event in the local area. The show was cancelled for poor weather in 2017, and again in 2020, due to restrictions caused by the COVID-19 pandemic.

== History ==
The North Devon Show is an annual one-day agricultural show in Devon, England, organised by the North Devon Agricultural Society (established 1966, registered charity 1071618). It has been held at a 50-acre site at Umberleigh Barton Farm at Umberleigh since 2012. The show includes animal and vehicle exhibitions, displays of local produce, agricultural trade stands and a fairground, among other attractions.

The first North Devon Show was held in 1966, formed from an amalgamation of shows held in Great Torrington and Instow. In 2016, it attracted an estimated 20,000 visitors and is the biggest event in the local area. The 2016 show was held at a cost of almost £300,000. The 2017 show was cancelled due to bad weather, and cancelled again in 2020 when officials cited the COVID-19 pandemic as grounds for cancellation. The 2023 event experienced heavy rain and had to close early, causing a loss of an expected £98,000 in ticket revenue. The show returned successfully in 2024.

== Events ==
The show includes many traditional agricultural events including carriage driving and gun dog displays, vintage vehicles, a grand parade of prize-winning livestock. In 2018 new sponsors Linear IT introduced a Space Invaders competition, and a live music stage was introduced in 2019. The show also includes demonstrations of rural skills like thatching and stone walling.
