= Royal County of Berkshire Show =

The Royal County of Berkshire Show, since 2023 the Newbury Agricultural Show, is an annual agricultural show in Berkshire, England that started in 1909 at Enborne Gate Farm, Newbury, as a horse show and has now grown to be a significant event for the farming world. The Newbury and District Agricultural Society was formed in 1909 to run the show and continues to do so. The show was cancelled for three years following the COVID-19 pandemic, during which time it was renamed. The show takes place over two days in September at the permanent showground near Chieveley.

== History ==
The Royal County of Berkshire Show is an annual agricultural show that started in 1909 at Enborne Gate Farm, Newbury, as a horse show and has now grown to be a significant event for the farming world. The Newbury and District Agricultural Society was formed in 1909 to run the show and continues to do so. The show takes place over two days in September at the permanent showground near Chieveley.

The show celebrated its centennial in 2009. That event coincided with the 250th anniversary of firm Carter Jonas and the 90th anniversary of the Berkshire Women's Institute, and 100 years of Morgan Motor Company sports cars, who all participated in the show. The show hosted the National Aberdeen Angus Show for the first time in 2009.

There were four breaks overall when no show took place: between 1914 and 1918 during the First World War, between 1928 and 1935 during the farming Depression, during the Second World War from 1939 to 1945, and 2020, 2021 and 2022 on grounds of the COVID-19 pandemic. The society running the show underwent a board resignation in 2021 after a membership coup, in response to the board's plans to sell off the showgroundsto resolve financial difficulties. When the show resumed in 2023, it was renamed the Newbury Agricultural Show.
