= Tendring Hundred Show =

Agricultural fair in Essex, England

Tendring Hundred Show is an annual agricultural fair held in Lawford, England, for over half a century. Established in 1899, for several decades previously, the event moved around northeast Essex. The show includes typical agricultural events such as animal classes, a vintage car parade, agricultural machinery, and displays including falconry, archery, hounds and dancing. The show, typically attracting more than 20,000 people, was cancelled for two years during the COVID-19 pandemic.

== History ==
The Tendring Hundred Show is an annual agricultural fair held in Lawford, England, for over half a century. The show was established in 1899 by Walton farmer John Eagle, and Herbert Wenden of Morehams Hall, Frating. For several decades previously, the event moved around northeast Essex. The show is organised by the Tendring Hundred Farmers’ Club, and typically attracts around 20,000 attendees.

There was no show between 1915 to 1918, 1930 to 1936, 1940 to 1945. In 1967, during an outbreak of foot-and-mouth disease, the show took place with no livestock. It was cancelled in 2001 during another foot-and-mouth outbreak. The show celebrated its 104th event in 2019, when the theme of the show was 'the delights of dairy', which included a live milking parlour. The show was cancelled for two years running during the COVID-19 pandemic in the United Kingdom, returning in 2022, when it had a record attendance of 25,000 people.

== Entertainment ==
The show includes a range of entertainment, including:

- Heavy horse classes
- Vintage car parade
- Heart of England falconry Display
- Scurry
- Hound parade
- Young Farmers' tug-of-war
- Team Spectrum kite display
- Krag Dancers from Poland

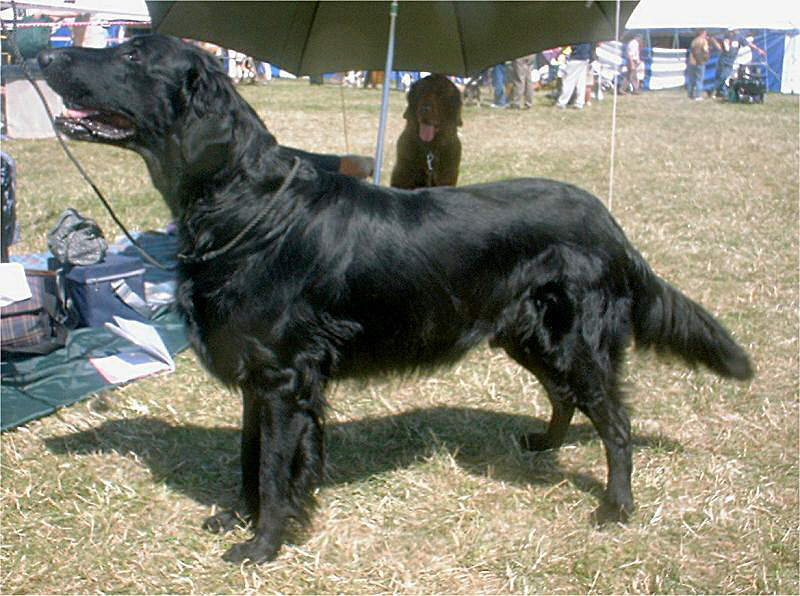
Dogs ready for showing at Tendring Hundred Agricultural Show

== Show areas ==
Regular show areas include:

- Countryside Area – arena including terrier racing, gun dog and falconry displays, fly fishing on a small artificial pond, archery and shooting demonstrations, and numerous societies representing all sorts of rural organizations from badgers and bees to the 10m Living River, with varieties of fresh water coarse fish native to UK rivers.
- Community Area – each year one local community shows a diverse range of groups exhibiting and performing on the stage.
- Flower Tent - concentrating on flower clubs, local horticultural societies and garden clubs, both displaying and exhibiting. There are experts on hand to give help and advice on all aspects of gardening as well as local nurseries displaying and selling items for home gardeners.
- Education Area - Over 40 schools displaying their work as well as student performances throughout the day.
- Children's Activity Area - featuring Professor Poppycock and his Punch & Judy, the Essex Storytellers, and bouncy castles.
- Craft Tent and Shoppers Market – with unique gifts and handicrafts for sale.
- Food Hall – incorporates a farmers' market, and several vendors selling food and beverages.
- Art Show - in which local artists display works for sale

== Animal shows ==
The animal classes include farm livestock and small animals.

- Poultry Show – the largest show of its kind in the area with over 100 classes for all types of fowl.
- Goat Show – many different breeds of goat
- Rabbit Show – with over 100 exhibits
- Cavy (Guinea Pig) Show - wide range of breeds and varieties, including some rare breeds.
- Rat Show – Summer Cup show run by the National Fancy Rat Society
- Pigeon Show – a long established show exhibiting 45 breeds of fancy pigeons
- Horse Show - With three rings in the dedicated horse area with a mix of ridden and in-hand classes for horses and ponies including the BSJA Show jumping arena, with affiliated show jumping throughout the day.
