= Bakewell Show =

1819–2017 agricultural show

The Bakewell Show was an agricultural show held annually in August at Bakewell, Derbyshire, England between 1819 and 2017. It is organised by the Bakewell Agricultural and Horticultural Society. The show has its own permanent show ground in Bakewell, where other events are held throughout the year.

== History ==
The Scarsdale and High Peak Agricultural Society was founded in 1819 and held the first show in Chesterfield on 5 July 1819. In 1827 the society was renamed the Derbyshire Agricultural Society, and over the years the organisation running the show took various names until acquiring its current name in 1929. In 1980 the show became a two-day event. The 2015 event was the 185th show, 196 years after the first.

Over the years the Bakewell show grew to include a farmers market, horticulture, equestrian events and competitions including mounted games, showjumping; displays and competitions of dogs, cattle, sheep, goats, and other animals, vintage vehicles, cheese and meats; traders and craft stalls, bands, and theatre; and displays such as Royal Signals Motorcycle Display Team, with up to 60,000 people attending. In addition to standard tickets, Patrons and VIP ticket holders had access to dedicated ring side grandstand seating and hospitality.

=== Cancelled Shows ===
The 1883 show was cancelled because of foot and mouth disease, and shows were cancelled 1915 to 1918 and 1940 to 1945 due to war, 2018 due to the previous years bad weather, and 2020 to 2021 due to the COVID-19 pandemic. In 2001 the show went ahead despite another foot and mouth epidemic, but included no animals.

=== Demise ===
The 2017 show was beset by bad weather leading to much of the ground turning to mud and cancelling many of the shows events, particularly on the second day. Concerns were immediately raised that the events may lead to the end of the show. The decision was made to take 2018 off to allow the ground time to heal, with the hope to return in 2019. However, the show did not return in full in 2019, rather a smaller one-day Farm to Plate event was held to celebrate the 200th anniversary. Due to return as a two-day event, the show scheduled for 8 and 9 August 2020 together with other events were cancelled due to restrictions associated with COVID-19, and was not held again in 2021.

The organisers, Bakewell Agricultural and Horticultural Society, wanted to get back to its roots with further events to follow the 2019 format more closely, adopting a new website focusing on the societies name, rather than operating as the Bakewell Show Office. From 2022 the Bakewell Agricultural and Horticultural Society ran a new one-day event, the Bakewell Country Festival in July instead of August, with the aim to run the new format in the future, fully replacing the Bakewell Show. The new event repeated in 2023 and 2024, relegating the Bakewell Show to history.
