= National Agricultural Fieldays =

Annual national agricultural show in New Zealand

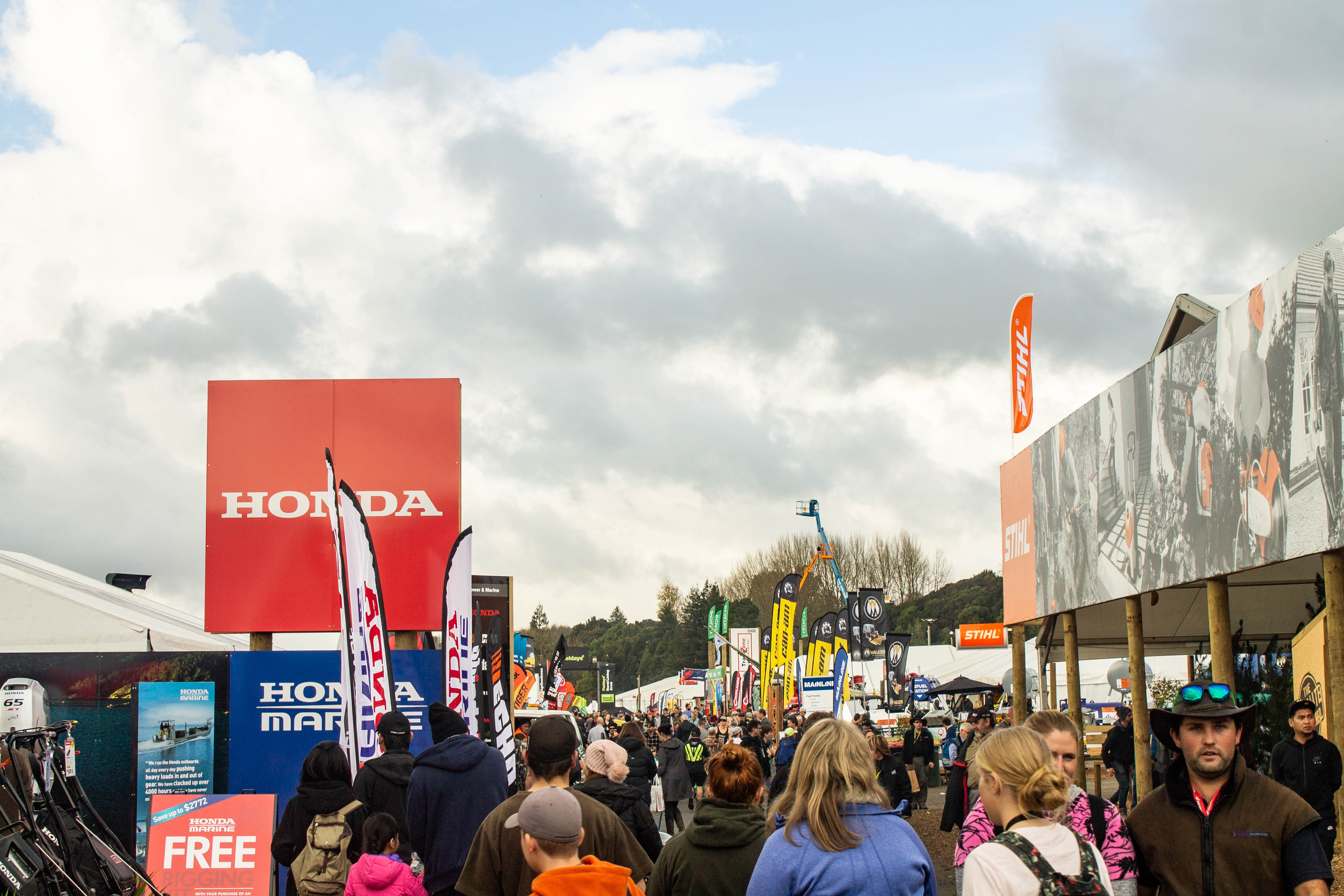
Crowd at Fieldays 2018

Fieldays or New Zealand National Agricultural Fieldays is an annual national agricultural show and field day event held in mid-June at the Mystery Creek Events Centre near Hamilton, New Zealand. It styles itself as "the biggest agricultural trade show in the southern hemisphere". It is owned and operated by the New Zealand National Fieldays Society.

Fieldays has 1,000 exhibitors and attracts over 100,000 visitors. The event has attractions such as sheepdog trials and tractor pulling contests. Smaller shows, held annually in New Zealand's towns and communities, are generally called "agricultural and pastoral shows" ("A&P shows").

The New Zealand National Fieldays Society was formed in 1968. Its first event was called the Town and Country Fair and was held over two days at Te Rapa Racecourse in June 1969. It was expected to attract 3,000 visitors on its first day, but 12,000 came. The second event, held over three days in March 1970, took place earlier in the year so that Queen Elizabeth, Prince Phillip, Prince Charles and Princess Anne could attend during their tour of New Zealand. The society bought the land at Mystery Creek in 1971 and held that year's event there.

Between 1985 and 1998 the Fieldays Society operated a short-term radio station for Fieldays visitors. Ag Week Radio, later known as Fieldays Radio, operated from the Mystery Creek site. It broadcast on 1XR 855 AM in 1985 and 1988, 1296 AM in June 1993, 792 AM in June 1994, 94.6 FM in June 1997 and 97.0 FM in June 1998.

The 2020 event was cancelled due to the COVID-19 pandemic.

== See also ==
- Agriculture in New Zealand
- Field days in Australia
