= Cheshire cheese =

Cheese from Cheshire, England

Cheshire
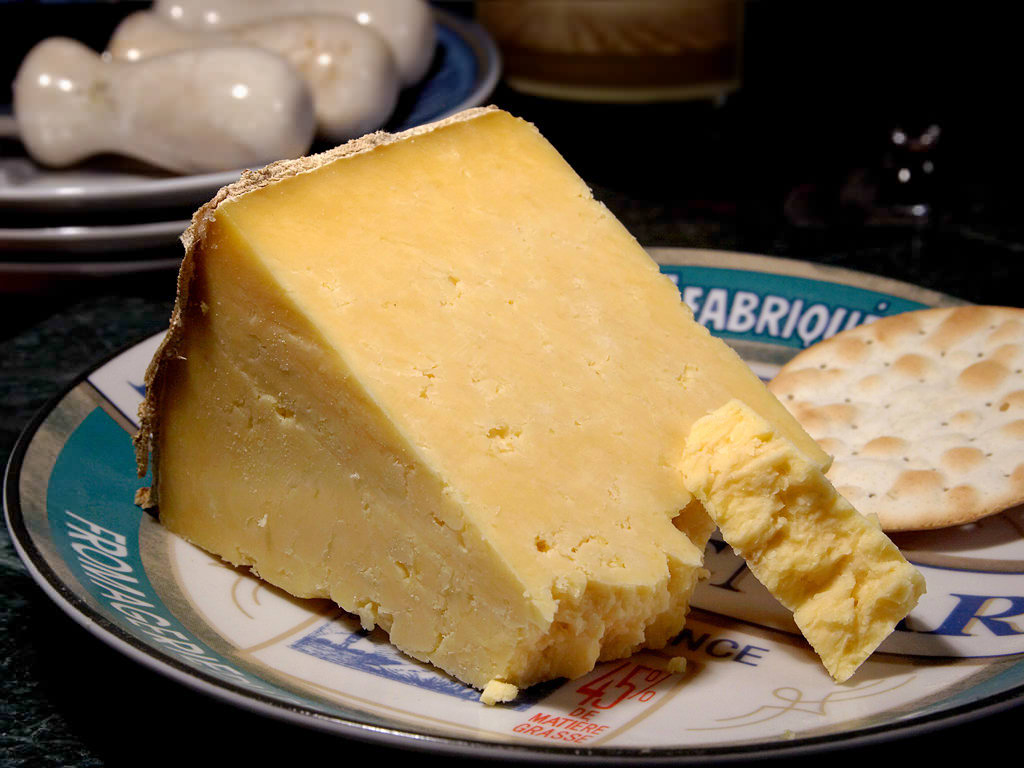
- Cheshire cheese
- Country of origin: England
- Region: Cheshire
- Source of milk: Cows
- Pasteurised: Frequently
- Texture: Hard crumbly
- Aging time: 4–8 weeks depending on variety
- Certification: No
- Named after: Cheshire[*]

Cheshire cheese is a dense and crumbly cheese. It is produced in the English county of Cheshire and the neighbouring counties Shropshire, Staffordshire, Denbighshire and Flintshire.

== History ==
Cheshire cheese is one of the oldest recorded named cheeses in British history: it is first mentioned, along with a Shropshire cheese, by the English naturalist and physician Thomas Muffet in Health's Improvement (c. 1580). There is a myth that Cheshire cheese is referred to in Domesday Book (1086).

Cheshire was the most popular type of cheese on the market in the late 18th century. In 1758 the Royal Navy ordered that ships be stocked with Cheshire and Gloucester cheeses. By 1823, Cheshire cheese production was estimated at 10,000 tonnes per year; in around 1870, it was estimated as 12,000 tons per year.

Until the late 19th century, the different varieties of Cheshire cheeses were aged to a sufficient level of hardness to withstand the rigours of transport (by horse and cart, and later by boat) to London for sale. Younger, fresher, crumbly cheese that required shorter storage – similar to the Cheshire cheese of today – began to gain popularity towards the end of the 19th century, particularly in the industrial areas in the North and the Midlands. It was a cheaper cheese to make as it required less storage.

Sales of Cheshire cheese peaked at around 40,000 tonnes in 1960, and declined as the range of cheeses available in the UK grew. Cheshire cheese remains the UK's largest-selling crumbly cheese, with sales of around 6,000 tonnes per year. Cheshire remains an important centre for cheese and cheesemaking, and until 2021 held the International Cheese Awards in Nantwich.

== Form ==
Cheshire cheese is dense and semi-hard, with a moist, crumbly texture and mild, salty taste. Industrial versions tend to be drier and less crumbly, more like a mild Cheddar cheese, as this makes them easier to process than cheese with the traditional texture. The Cheshire family of cheeses is a distinct group that includes other crumbly cheeses from the North of England such as Wensleydale and Crumbly Lancashire.

Cheshire cheese comes in red, white and blue varieties. The original plain white version accounts for most of the production. Red Cheshire, coloured with annatto to a shade of deep orange, was developed in the hills of North Wales and sold to travellers on the road to Holyhead. This trade was so successful that the travellers came to believe that all Cheshire cheese was orange, and producers in its home county were obliged to dye their cheese in order to match the expectations of the market. Blue Cheshire has blue veins like Stilton or Shropshire Blue, but is less creamy than Stilton and is not coloured orange as Shropshire Blue is. Historically, it was much favoured in London clubs since the Georgian period. It has a long history, but production ceased in the late 1980s. Recently it has been revived by several manufacturers in England.

== See also ==
- Nantwich Museum, including an exhibition on Cheshire cheese.
- History of agriculture in Cheshire
- Lucy Appleby of Hawkstone Abbey Farm
