= International Cheese Awards =

International cheese competition

Coordinates: 53.0688°N 2.5421°W

- 2012 ICA logo
- Genre: Food festival
- Begins: Tuesday prior to last Wednesday in July
- Ends: Last Wednesday in July
- Frequency: Annual
- Locations: Dorfold Park, Nantwich, England
- Inaugurated: 1897
- Attendance: ≈40,000
- Website: www.internationalcheeseawards.co.uk

The International Cheese Awards is an annual cheese show and competition. Until 2019, it was held at Dorfold Park near Nantwich, England. Held since 1897, the show attracts entries from around the world.

In Nantwich, day one of the two-day event was the judging and trade day, attended primarily by industry participants and press, while day two was scheduled to coincide with the Nantwich and South Cheshire Agricultural Show, and attracted about 40,000 visitors to sample the wares and hear the announcements of the winners.

The International Cheese Awards is an activity of the Nantwich Agricultural Society, a UK registered charity.

In 2021 it was announced the Awards would be moving to the Staffordshire Show Grounds and would no longer be part of the Nantwich Show event.

== Show features ==
In addition to sampling and purchasing more than 4,600 cheeses in the Cheese Pavilion, visitors to the show are treated to various attractions throughout the day including cheese making demonstrations, trophy presentations and live cookery demonstrations.

== History ==
The original cheese show was founded in 1897 when the Cheshire Agricultural Society, who had been holding shows for some years at different venues in the county, split the county into four shows in their own right, one of which was Nantwich & Northwich, and in 1903 the show was held under its own auspices and with no link to the Cheshire Agricultural Society.

The Nantwich Dairy Shows continued to be staged each year, and it is recorded that the Dairy Show of 1908 was held in the Market Hall on 28 & 29 October.

The Dairy and Horticultural Shows continued to be held annually, however, the two World Wars overshadowed such events, and there is little in detail of them to be found during this period. The show continued to be held intermittently until, in 1946, the show found a permanent home at Dorfold Park, where it has been held annually since, apart for break in years due to outbreaks of Foot & Mouth disease.

The Nantwich Cheese Show celebrated its centenary in 1997 with an appearance by the Royal Household Cavalry.

In 2009 the Nantwich Cheese Show was re-branded to the International Cheese Awards.

In 2021 it was announced the Awards would be moving to the Staffordshire Show Grounds and would no longer be part of the Nantwich Show event.

== Committee and charity ==
The International Cheese Awards is organised and run by a committee of volunteers contributing expertise from the dairy and cheese industries as well as event management, sponsorship, PR and marketing industries.

== See also ==
- Cheshire County Show
- History of agriculture in Cheshire
