= Clifden Show =

Horse show in Ireland

The Clifden Show in Ireland is the largest horse show in the world which showcases the Connemara pony breed. It is not unusual for over 400 ponies from all over Ireland as well as other countries to attend this annual event. The show attracts breeders, industry experts, and visitors from all over the world, where ponies are bought and sold.

The origins of the show date back to 1924 when the show was held in Roundstone. Since 1947, the show is held in Clifden.

There was one casualty of the show: in 2020.
