= Canterbury A&P Show =

Agricultural and pastoral show in New Zealand

The New Zealand Agricultural Show
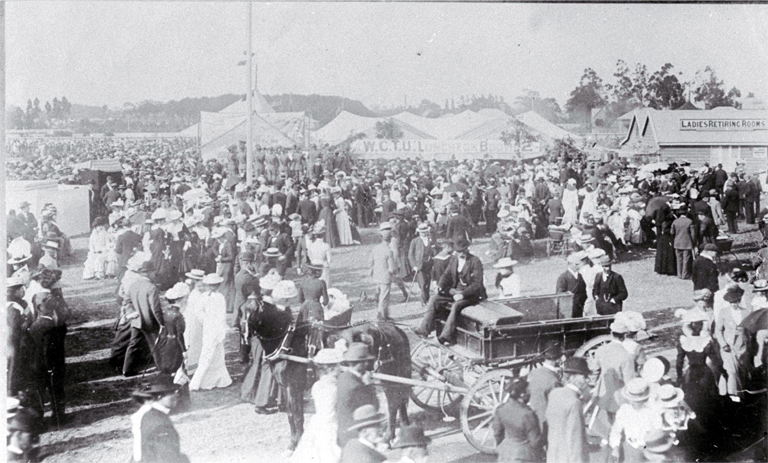
- Canterbury Agricultural and Pastoral Association's Metropolitan Show, held at the Addington Showgrounds, c. 1910
- Status: active
- Date: 15–17 November 2023
- Frequency: Annually
- Venue: Canterbury Agricultural Park (since 1997)
- Locations: Wigram, Christchurch
- Country: New Zealand
- Years active: 164
- Inaugurated: 22 October 1862
- Founder: Canterbury A&P Association
- Previous event: 9–11 November 2022
- Next event: 15–17 November 2023
- Participants: 5000 competitors and over 3000 animals on-site
- Attendance: Over 100,000
- People: President – Anne Rogers
- Member: 2500 financial members
- Website: www.theshow.co.nz

The New Zealand Agricultural Show (formerly the Canterbury A&P Show) is hosted by the Canterbury A&P Association. It is the largest agricultural and pastoral show in New Zealand and features a unique combination of agriculture and entertainment. The Show has welcomed over one million visitors since moving to Canterbury Agricultural Park in 1997. The Show attracts on average 100,000 people, over 5000 livestock and features competition entries and over 600 trade exhibitors.

== History ==
The first Agricultural and Pastoral Show in Christchurch was held in a paddock north of Latimer Square on 22 October 1862. The Canterbury A&P Association was formed a few weeks later on 23 January 1863, with Robert Wilkin as its first president. In April 1863, the A&P Association purchased 14 acres (5.7 ha) in Colombo Street South for show grounds; this is now Sydenham Park. In November 1887, new show grounds opened in Addington.

In 1996, a much larger facility of 145 hectares (1.45 km^{2}) was bought in Wigram located on Curletts Road; it was the first purpose-built facility in New Zealand. It was named Canterbury Agricultural Park and was first used for the 1997 show.

In 2018, the association took the decision to rebrand the show to the New Zealand Agricultural Show. The move caused some controversy amongst the Royal Agricultural Society. In recent years the show has trended away from its origin as a commercial farming trade show, and moved more towards an outdoor retail, education and entertainment event.

The only cancellations were in 1919, 2020 and 2021 due to COVID-19 lockdowns. In 2024 the show was cancelled due to financial difficulties, however it was later reinstated to go ahead as The Christchurch Show. Attendance was 115,000 visitors over the weekend in 2022, and 125,000 in 2023.

=== Anniversary Day ===
New Zealand law provides an anniversary day for each province. The anniversary day for the Canterbury Province was originally 16 December, the day of the arrival in 1850 of the first two of the First Four Ships, the Charlotte Jane and the Randolph. The Friday of the A&P Show had since at least 1918 been the People's Day or Show Day, and sometime between 1955 and 1958, Christchurch City Council moved the anniversary day to coincide with Show Day, as this allowed banks and businesses to close and people to attend the A&P Show.

The definition for Show Day is the "second Friday after the first Tuesday of November (i.e. Show Day will be two weeks after the first Tuesday in November — on a Friday, mainly so that it does not clash with the Melbourne Cup Racing Carnival)" (note that Melbourne Cup is held on the first Tuesday in November). The anniversary day as set for the A&P Show is observed in mid and North Canterbury, whilst South Canterbury observes Dominion Day (the fourth Monday of September).

=== Christchurch/Canterbury New Zealand Cup Week ===
The Show coincides with the Cup week that has the a number of major horse and greyhound races, notably:

- the New Zealand Trotting Cup for harness racing (pacers) on the Tuesday at Addington Raceway.
- the New Zealand Cup for Greyhounds on the Thursday at Addington Raceway.
- the New Zealand Cup for thoroughbred racing (gallopers) on the Saturday at Riccarton Park Racecourse.

The various race meetings contain a number of other key races in each of these racing codes.

== See also ==
- Harness racing in New Zealand
- Thoroughbred racing in New Zealand
