= Field day (agriculture) =

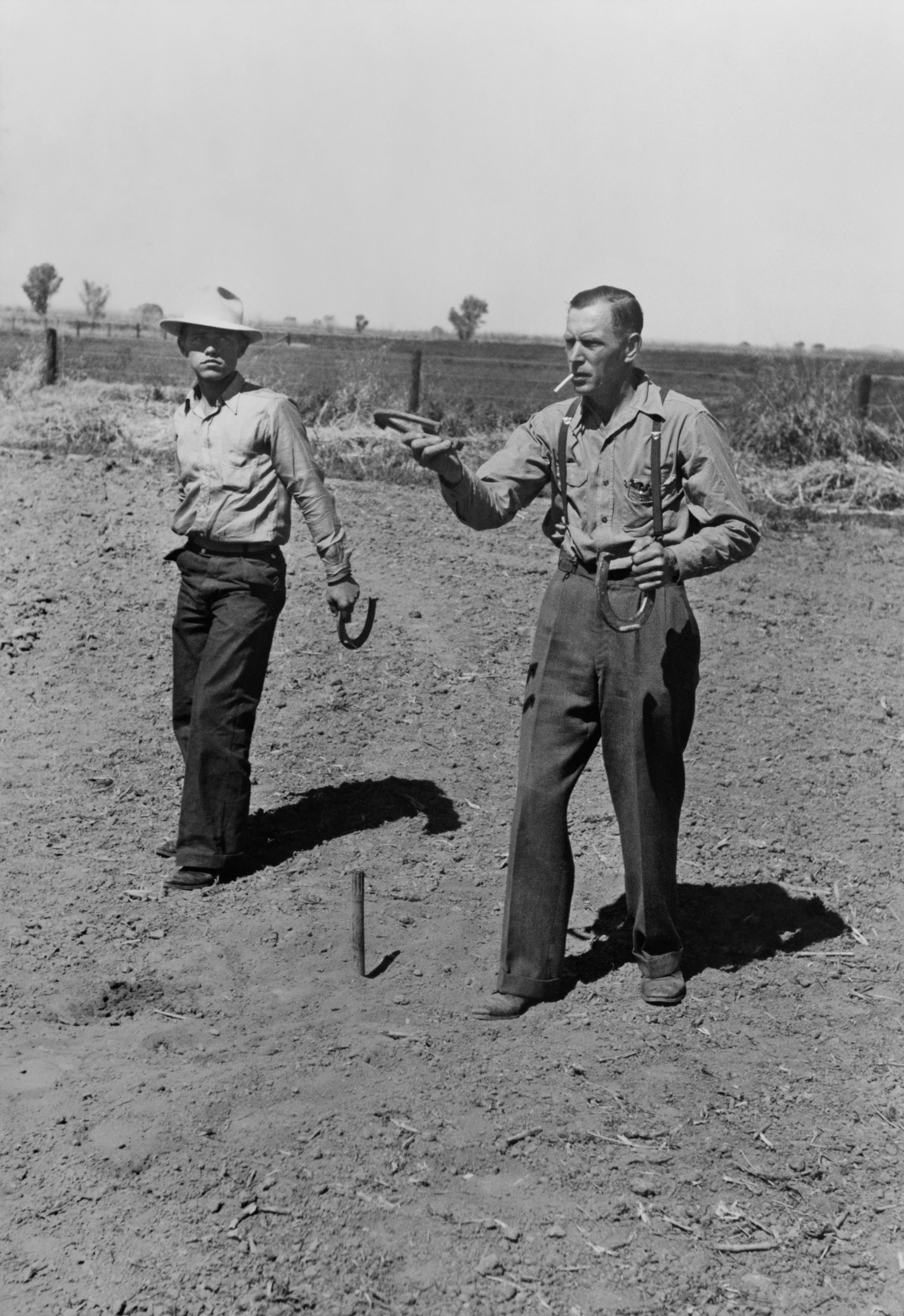
Horseshoe pitching contest at the annual field day of the FSA farmworkers community, Yuma, Arizona (1942)

A field day is a large trade show for agricultural industry and equipment, especially for broadacre farming. It contrasts with an agricultural show in that a show focuses on livestock and judging. A field day focuses on equipment, demonstrations and processes.

A field day may include events such as ploughing competitions not usually associated with shows due to the larger space required. The events are good sources of agricultural information, as organizers can arrange for guest speakers to talk on a range of topics.

== Field days by country ==
=== New Zealand ===
New Zealand National Agricultural Fieldays is held at Mystery Creek, Hamilton, New Zealand and attracts 1,000 exhibitors and over 115,000 visitors through its gates. Smaller shows, held annually in New Zealand's towns and communities, are generally called Agricultural and Pastoral shows (A&P shows).

=== Ukraine ===
On August 28, 2013 Mykolaiv National Agrarian University started a new tradition of field day in Ukraine.

On August 28, 2013 Field Day on technology of vegetables cultivation was held at the Educational, Scientific and Practical Center of Mykolayiv NAU together with the "S-Rostok company" and with participation of Mykola Kruglov, the Head of Mykolayiv Regional State Administration.

Mykolayiv NAU and the company "S-Rostok" combined efforts across university science, agrarian education, and business to execute a joint pilot project. This involved creating experimental demonstration fields featuring nearly 150 new breeds and hybrids of vegetable crops from international producers.

The world-famous companies in vegetable seed business from France, Germany, Italy, Spain, Japan, the USA, Israel, and the Netherlands (16 countries in total) participated in the event.
