= North American International Livestock Exposition =

Trade fair in Louisville, Kentucky, US

North American International Livestock Exposition (NAILE) is a livestock show held each November in Louisville, Kentucky and lasts for two weeks. It is billed as the "world's largest all-breed, purebred livestock exposition", with nine major livestock divisions with competitors from the 48 contiguous states. These divisions are beef cattle, Boer goats, dairy cattle, dairy goats, draft horses, quarter horses, llamas & alpacas, sheep, and swine. A PRCA rodeo, the North American Championship Rodeo, is also held.

Visitors from 15 countries attend the Expo. Many of these go to the event to acquire purebred livestock semen and embryos to export from the United States. This makes the event attractive to American "seedstock producers".

The events are held at the Kentucky Exposition Center. The giant expo was established in 1974. It is produced by the Commonwealth of Kentucky under the guidance of the Kentucky State Fair Board.

== See also ==
- List of attractions and events in the Louisville metropolitan area
