= Mazayen al-Ibl =

Saudi Arabian beauty pageant for camels

Mazayen al-Ibl, also known as the King Abdulaziz Festival, is a beauty pageant for camels put on by the Qahtani tribe of Saudi Arabia. It is held in Guwei'iyya yearly. In 2007, 250 owners participated, showing a total of more than 1,500 camels. Participants come from every Gulf country except Oman, and every region of Saudi Arabia except the south-western mountain region, where there are no camel breeders. The competition is held in respect to the role of camels in Bedouin history, and to preserve purebred camel strains. No pageant was planned in 2020.

Four varieties of camel participate in the show: the majaheem, which is black; the maghateer, which is white; the shi'l, which is dark brown; and the sulfur, which is beige with black shoulders. There is strict health testing and veterinarians present at the event. The event is supported by the King and Crown Prince Sultan.

Prizes are awarded to the most beautiful camels in four categories based on the number of camels entered by the owner: groups of 100, 50, 10, and individual camels. The beauty of the camel is based on the "size of its head; whether its lips cover its teeth, the length of its neck and the roundness of its hump" and "big eyes, long lashes, and a long neck." "The nose should be long and droop down, that's more beautiful [...] The ears should stand back, and the neck should be long. The hump should be high, but slightly to the back." The most beautiful camel is called the "Bayraq" and can fetch prices of up to $3 million US dollars. They'will also receive trophies designed and made by British silverware manufacturers Thomas Lyte. In 2007, prizes included 10 million riyals and 72 sports utility vehicles. The winning camels may also sell for prices exceeding one million riyals. There are parts of the festival dedicated to camel trading, where millions of dollars change hands every day.

Some members of more stringent Muslim schools have accused the shows as being evil, and have stated that those who participate should "seek redemption in Allah". In addition, some breeders refuse to take part in the competition, saying that it has become too commercial because wealthy businessmen, who have no interest in preserving the breeds and are only interested in fame, have started to enter. There are also dances, feasts, and parties during the festival, as well as youth camel shows.

A similar contest in Abu Dhabi is the al-Dhafra Festival, which also awards prizes to the best milking camels and hosts camel races. This festival focuses on Asayel (local camels) and Majahim (dark-skinned camels) and also features falcon hunting, Saluki and Arabian horse races, and date packing contests.
