= National Farm Machinery Show =

Annual exhibition in Louisville, Kentucky, US

The National Farm Machinery Show is an agricultural machinery exposition held annually in February indoors at the Kentucky Exposition Center in Louisville, Kentucky, United States. Attendance exceeds 300,000 people, with 800 exhibitors in display space of 1,200,000 square feet (110,000 m^{2}).

The show started as an electricity demonstration and exhibit in 1963, and adopted the name National Farm Machinery Show in 1966.

The National Farm Machinery Show includes the Championship Tractor Pull, an annual event since 1969.

== See also ==
- List of attractions and events in the Louisville metropolitan area
