= History of agriculture in Cheshire =

Agriculture has historically been the primary industry of the English county of Cheshire. Dairy farming has predominated, and the county was particularly known for cheese-making.

== Prehistoric era ==
The area now forming Cheshire was sparsely populated during the entire prehistoric period compared with southern England. The earliest archaeological evidence of farming dates from the Early Neolithic period (4000–3001 BC); excavations at Oversley Farm near Styal found remains of burnt cereals associated with an Early Neolithic rectangular timber structure. Burnt grain found at Tatton in association with post holes and flint artefacts dated to 3500–2900 BC has been interpreted as a transitory farming settlement. Local historian W.J. Varley speculates that the earliest Neolithic farmers cleared the forest to cultivate emmer wheat and barley using mattocks of bone or stone, and herded oxen, goats, sheep and pigs using dogs; they lacked ploughs and horses.

The absence of lime-rich basic soils and the high rainfall might have delayed Cheshire's agricultural exploitation compared with the adjacent areas of North Wales and the Peak District, with light soils overlaying sand, gravel or sandstone being cultivated before poorly drained clay soils. In the Bronze Age, agricultural usage was largely concentrated on uplands in the Pennine fringe in the east of the county and the Mid Cheshire Ridge. This trend continued during the Iron Age, although there were some scattered lowland farmsteads such as at Bruen Stapleford.

== Roman occupation ==
Pollen analysis suggests extensive forest clearance had occurred by or during the Roman period, although there is little evidence that the land was cultivated; felling could have been necessary to fuel the salt industry. Only limited evidence of Roman field systems has been found in the county; possible examples include Longley Farm, Kelsall, Pale Heights, Eddisbury and Somerford Hall, near Congleton. Spelt was grown at the Roman settlement of Wilderspool and a farmstead has been excavated at Birch Heath, Tarporley. Querns have been discovered at the settlement at Saltney, near the legionary fortress of Deva (Chester); the site has been suggested to have grown cereals for the garrison, although the heavy clay soil makes this less likely. Corn-drying ovens were installed at Cheshire's only known Roman villa at Eaton by Tarporley.

== Domesday survey ==
The Domesday survey of 1086 forms the first documentary evidence for agriculture in the county. The county continued to be sparsely populated at this date compared with southern England and the South Midlands. The total population has been estimated to lie between 10,500 and 11,000, with a population density ranging from almost uninhabited in the east of the county to 20 per square mile in the Wirral and the valleys of the Dee, Gowy and Weaver. The county contained around 490 hides of farmed land, mainly in the west, where "hide" refers to a variable area probably equivalent to the land that could support a household. A total of 935 ploughlands was recorded, although there were only 456 plough teams. One interpretation of these figures is that only around 50% of the available arable land was in cultivation at the time of the survey, perhaps because much of the county had made only a limited recovery from the devastation caused by William I's suppression of the Mercian uprisings sixteen years previously. An alternative view is that some land had not previously been taxed.

At the time of the Domesday survey, mixed subsistence farming was the norm. The main crops grown were wheat, barley, oats and peas. Very little meadow was recorded in the Domesday survey; the majority lay in river valleys and probably represented water meadows. Though not mentioned in the survey, cattle, pigs and sheep were presumably the main livestock at this date.

== Medieval and Tudor periods ==
In the 12th century, the area was described as being "unproductive of cereals, especially of corn". During the 12th to 14th centuries, the main crops were barley, oats and rye, with wheat also being frequently grown. In the 15th and 16th centuries, barley and oats were grown across the county, with rye being largely concentrated in the south; wheat was also grown in some areas, although much of the land was unsuitable. Peas and beans were mainly grown in the north, and other crops included hemp and flax. The three-field system of crop rotation appears not to have been commonly used in the county, with irregular field systems taking its place, as in much of northern England. There is evidence for around 250 commonly held open fields across Cheshire, which were generally smaller than those in the Midlands, and used a two-field or multiple-field pattern. Oxen were usually preferred over horses for ploughing. Orchards were recorded in Chester in the 16th century. The designation of the three royal hunting forests of Mara and Mondrem, Macclesfield and Wirral, which at their height covered around 40% of the county, significantly slowed agricultural development within their boundaries. The rise in population during the 12th and 13th centuries created a need for increased agricultural output, and trees were cleared in the forests (assarting) and marsh reclaimed for use as arable land. Agricultural efficiency also improved during this period with, for example, the practice of applying a clay and lime mixture termed marl as a fertiliser from the early 13th century, earlier than in much of Britain. Marl pits were common in some parts of the county. Subsistence agriculture was gradually replaced by the trade of surplus produce at local markets and fairs.

By the early 14th century, cattle were frequently recorded straying in the hunting forests, and beef was exported from the county. There are records of dairy herds, for example at Macclesfield, in the mid-14th century. Large numbers of pigs were fed on acorns and nuts in the forests and woodland by right of pannage on payment of a fine, and pork was exported from the county in the 13th and 14th centuries. Although the adjacent counties of Shropshire and Staffordshire were important in wool production, Cheshire was probably never a significant sheep-farming area, although it probably produced sufficient wool for domestic use. Large sheep farms were concentrated in the hilly areas of Macclesfield Forest and in cleared areas of Delamere.

In Cheshire as elsewhere in England, clearance of land for agriculture was interrupted by the Black Death of 1348–51, when a substantial proportion of agricultural workers died. Small-scale enclosure of land for use as private arable fields or cattle pasture started in around the 15th century and escalated during the Tudor era, although town fields, remnants of the open-field system, remained until the late 18th or early 19th century. Towards the end of the 14th century, some arable land was converted into pasture. Although the three royal forests remained protected wooded areas, by the mid-15th century, some areas had been cleared for use as pasture, especially in the upland regions of Macclesfield Forest, and all the forests continued to be used to pasture pigs and goats. Although mixed farming remained the norm across the county throughout the medieval period, cattle farming increased during the 15th and early 16th centuries, with dairy cattle predominating in the south and west, and beef cattle in the north.

The dissolution of the monasteries saw the land farmed by the religious houses across the county being forfeit to the Crown between 1536 and 1540. Cheshire contained a higher proportion of monastic land than average, with most of the county's land belonging either to a monastery or to the Crown, and monastic land was in general well managed. St Werburgh's in Chester alone held 57 manors in Cheshire, and Vale Royal, Combermere and Norton also had considerable land holdings. Much of the land was sold or leased to lay members of the Cheshire gentry, creating large estates, although St Werburgh's holdings were used to endow the new cathedral.

== 17th century to the mid-19th century ==
Cheese-making was already well established by the early years of the 17th century, when William Camden attested to the quality of the product:

[T]he grass of this Country has a peculiar good quality, so that they make great store of Cheese, more agreeable and better relish'd than those of any other parts of the Kingdom, even when they procur the same Dary Women to make them.

In the mid-17th century, Cheshire cheese began to be sent by sea from Chester and Liverpool to the London market, and later to the North West. Subsequently, dairy farming and cheese production in the county expanded rapidly, becoming more commercialised. Farms started to pool their milk to make large cheeses for export in specialised dairies, a practice then sufficiently unusual to draw comment from travel-writer Celia Fiennes. By 1729, the trade with London has been estimated at 5,860 tons of cheese, and Cheshire cheese remained the leading brand on the London market until the mid-19th century. During this period, cheese continued to be made by hand, using traditional methods.

The Cheshire Agricultural Society met for the first time in 1838, with Stapleton Cotton, 1st Viscount Combermere as the first president.

== Mid-to-late 19th century ==
By 1850, Cheshire cheese was being overtaken in popularity by Cheddar from Somerset, and over the following decades there was also increasing competition from cheeses made in the Netherlands and America. Cheshire dairies began to adopt modern production practices pioneered by Somerset innovator, Joseph Harding, but were slow to adopt industrial cheese-making practices developed in America. The proximity to rapidly growing urban centres, together with the expanding railway network, also led to an increase in the production of milk during this period, although cheese remained the county's major dairy product.

Epidemics of cattle disease, including foot and mouth disease in 1839, several outbreaks of pleuropneumonia, and rinderpest (cattle plague) in 1865–66, led to the formation of numerous friendly societies and mutual associations to provide assistance to farmers; several were sponsored by the landowners of the county's major estates, particularly Cholmondeley, Crewe and Peckforton. A short-lived cattle insurance company was also established in Knutsford in 1865. The 1865–66 rinderpest epidemic affected much of England but was particularly devastating in Cheshire; entire herds died and the county's economy collapsed for 18 months.

The land use survey of 1877 recorded 529,381 acres (214,233 ha) of farmland, of which 355,016 acres (143,670 ha) was permanent grass and 174,365 acres (70,563 ha) was arable land, with additionally 1,384 acres (560 ha) of orchards, 896 acres (363 ha) of market gardens and 487 acres (197 ha) of nursery grounds. In around 1870, John Marius Wilson's Imperial Gazetteer of England and Wales described the agriculture of the county:

The estates, in general, are large; but the farms, on the average, are under 100 acres. Leases commonly run eleven years. Husbandry has undergone much improvement; but is still in need of much more. Wheat was formerly a famous produce; but is now less cultivated than before. Potatoes have considerable attention, and average about 10 tons per acre. Cheese is a main produce; and is exported, to all parts of England and to the Continent, to the amount of about 12,000 tons a year. Butter also is made in considerable quantity. Much attention has been paid to the breed of cows. About 65,000 sheep are kept, yielding about 1,250 packs of wool a year.

John Bartholomew's Gazetteer of the British Isles of 1887 described "numerous excellent dairy farms" producing the "celebrated Cheshire cheese", but also mentioned "extensive market gardens, the produce of which is sent to Liverpool, Manchester, and the neighbouring towns."

== 20th and 21st centuries ==
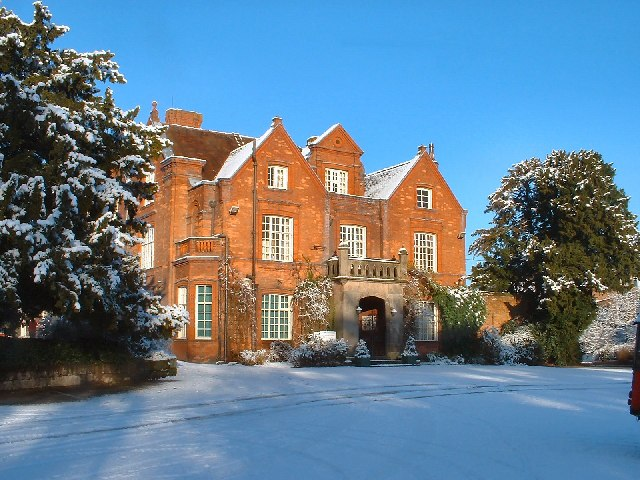
Cheshire School of Agriculture, now known as Reaseheath College

Agriculture, especially dairy farming, continued to be Cheshire's primary industry during the 20th century, despite a substantial decline in the proportion of the workforce employed in the sector. The number of full-time agricultural workers halved between the 1920s and 1985, and the agricultural workforce has continued to decline into the 21st century. Agricultural earnings increased rapidly over the century, approaching pay in the industrial sector since the Second World War, reflecting an increase in skills required as farming practices were modernised. In 1921, the Cheshire School of Agriculture opened at Reaseheath, near Nantwich, offering tertiary-level education in agriculture for the first time.

By the early years of the century, milk was beginning to overtake cheese as the main dairy product, mainly to supply the large urban centres close to the county's borders. Milk production required more intensive farming practices; the introduction of tuberculin-tested milk in 1923 and the drive towards increased hygiene also led to changes, including the replacement of traditional shorthorn cattle with Ayrshires and later Friesians, and the gradual adoption of milking machines. Surplus milk production was a problem until the 1930s; it was a major concern of the local branch of the National Farmers Union, founded early in the century, until the creation of the Milk Marketing Board in 1933, which guaranteed a fair minimum price. Farm-based cheese production began to decline early in the century; in 1914 around 2,000 Cheshire farms still sold cheese, but this had fallen to 405 in 1939. In the mid-1920s, Cheshire cheese accounted for 30% of the non-imported domestic cheese market, second only to Cheddar, but competed poorly with imported cheese. In an attempt to improve its competitiveness with factory-made foreign cheeses, which were more uniform in quality, a grading scheme was introduced for Cheshire cheese towards the end of the 1920s; this voluntary scheme was superseded from the 1930s by various compulsory national grading schemes. During the Second World War all cheese production was transferred to factories termed "creameries" and rationing meant that Cheshire cheese had to be reformulated to reduce its tendency to crumble when cut. The county's cheese-producing farms never recovered; they numbered 44 in 1948 and as few as 12 by 1974. Outbreaks of foot-and-mouth disease in 1923–24, 1952, 1960–61, 1967–68 and 2001 caused substantial losses to dairy farmers in the county.

Mechanisation of arable farming started during the First World War, in an attempt to increase efficiency due to the scarcity of labour, and continued during the depression of the interwar period, when low food prices sharply reduced farmers' profits. It accelerated with the outbreak of the Second World War, and continued since then. A total of 120,000 acres (49,000 ha) of pasture were ploughed during the Second World War to increase the production of wheat, potatoes and root vegetables, with the Women's Land Army, school children, refugees and prisoners of war all contributing labour.

Early in the century there was agricultural diversification into market gardening, initially to produce vegetables and flowers for urban consumption. Soft fruit production increased after the 1960s, particularly with "pick-your-own" farms; container-grown plants also started to be produced. The number of specialised smallholdings, such as poultry farms, increased during the century.

In 1985 nearly 500,000 acres (200,000 ha) were used for agriculture, a relatively small decrease from the figures for 1877, with around 8,500 farms. Six estates of over 1,000 acres (400 ha) still survived, the largest being the Grosvenor Estate of approximately 10,800 acres (4,400 ha). In 2007, agricultural land had reduced to 163,100 hectares (403,000 acres) in 4,545 holdings; it still represented 70% of Cheshire's total area. The total workforce employed in farming was 8,744, with nearly half (47%) being part-time and 7% casual. The trend towards smallholdings was maintained with nearly half (47%) of all holdings being of less than 5 hectares (12 acres), and almost two-thirds (66%) below 20 hectares (49 acres); only 7% were 100 hectares (250 acres) or above. The total number of cattle (both dairy and beef) in 2006 was 225,640, representing 23% of the breeding herds in the North-West of England; however, the number of dairy holdings was in steep decline, from 988 in 2002 to 716 in 2007.

== See also ==
- Agriculture in the United Kingdom
- History of Cheshire
