= Banbury cheese =

English cheese which is no longer produced

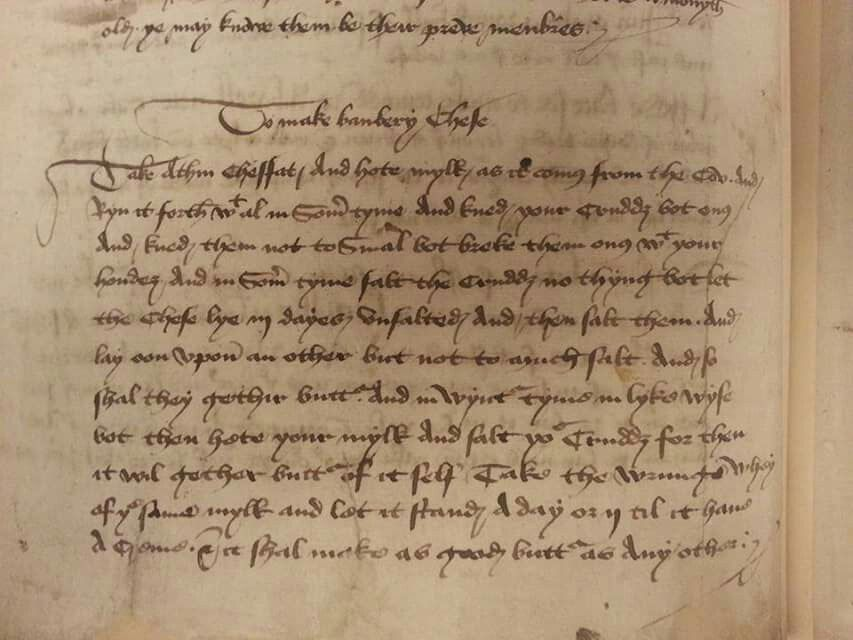
15th/16th-century recipe for Banbury cheese. Sloane MS 1201.

Banbury cheese was an English cheese produced in Banbury, Oxfordshire. Once one of the town's most prestigious exports, and nationally famous, the production of the cheese went into decline by the 18th century, and was eventually forgotten. The cheese is best known today through an insult in Shakespeare's Merry Wives of Windsor (1597).

== History ==
Banbury cheeses first appear in the historical record in 1430, when fourteen were sent to John of Lancaster, 1st Duke of Bedford, among supplies for France. In 1586, William Camden spoke of the cheese as a source of fame for the town. The earliest printed cookbook to make reference to the cheese was Thomas Dawson's The Good Huswifes Handmaide for the Kitchin (1594), used in a recipe for the "tarte of Cheese".

The cheese was renowned in its day. It was given as a gift to several significant figures, including Thomas Cromwell (1533 and 1538), Sir Joseph Williamson (1677), and Horace Walpole (1768). Barnaby Googe, in his 1614 guide to husbandry, called it the third best cheese in England. Robert Burton was even more flattering in his Anatomy of Melancholy (1621): "Of all cheeses, I take that kind which we call Banbury Cheese to be the best". According to the Victoria County History, "in the sixteenth century the name of Banbury at once brought to the mind of the hearer the famous cheeses".

Historically, Banbury's chief exports were its ale, cheese, and cakes. Banbury ale enjoyed a high of popularity in the Middle Ages, but was virtually unknown outside the town into the 16th century; Banbury cakes maintain popularity today. The production of Banbury cheese essentially constituted a cottage industry. The centre of the cheese-making industry in the area was in the Northamptonshire hamlets, Grimsbury, Nethercote and to some extent Huscote, Banbury though some producers were found within the town and in nearby Oxfordshire hamlets. Records from 1600 show twenty-one residences in the parish of Cropredy, four miles north of Banbury, were cheese-makers. The first Thursday after Old Michaelmas was traditionally a cheese fair in Banbury.

The production of Banbury cheese declined into the 18th century; Edward Chamberlayne in 1700, Daniel Defoe in 1727, and Richard Pococke in 1756 were among the last to comment on it. By the 19th-century, Alfred Beesley reported in his History of Banbury (1841), "the oft-recorded fame of the town for Cheese has departed from it, and the knowledge of the manufacture of the real "Banbury Cheese" is perhaps now unknown". A special form of Banbury cheese, latter-made cheese, was the last to disappear. By 1840, the number of producers of this cheese was diminishing, and in 1848, for the first time, none was offered for sale at the Banbury fair. Local historian Martin Thomas has speculated that the late-18th-century inclosure acts were responsible for the decline in the production of the cheese. As land was taken from commoners and appropriated by new landlords, the new owners may have preferred the more profitable sheep over cattle, and so the town would begin to lack the products necessary for the cheese's production.

Some attempt has been made to revive the cheese. In 1965, a recipe for the cheese was rediscovered. The Historical Society of Banbury attempted to find a cheese-maker to produce the cheese for the November 1969 annual dinner of the Society, but no capable cheese-makers were found, so the enterprise failed.

== Description ==
The cheese was made from cow's milk, with a golden yellow colour and a strong flavour. It was made in rounds, with an outer skin, and was only about one inch thick. Jones' Good Huswifes Handmaid (1594) described it as with a keen, sharp flavour; Defoe described it as soft and rich; and Camden described it as creamy. According to Defoe, a special form of very rich Banbury cheese was late in the year, never before Michaelmas, called "latter-made" cheese. It was white and one-inch thick—otherwise unremarkable as compared to other soft cheeses—but commanded high prices and was much more delicious. Defoe reports it cost 1s 6d per pound, new, and about 1s 9d, ripe (equivalent £8.90 and £10.40 in 2010 GBP, according to Thomas).

A recipe for the cheese survives in the 15th/16th-century manuscript, Sloane MS 1201:

Take a thin cheese vat, and hot milk as it comes from the cow. And run it forth withal in summer time. And knead your curds but once. And knead them not too small, but break them once with your hands. And in summer time salt the curds nothing but let the cheese lie 3 days unsalted. And then salt them. And lay one upon another but not too much salt. And so shall they gather butter. And in winter time in likewise, but then hot your milk. And salt your curds for then it will gather butter of itself. Take the wrung whey of the same milk and let it stand a day or two till it have a cream and it shall make as good butter as any other.

== Insult ==
In The Merry Wives of Windsor, Bardolph addresses Abraham Slender with reference to the Banbury cheese:

You Banbury cheese!

— The Merry Wives of Windsor (1597), 1.1.126

This insult alludes to the thin proportions of the cheese, especially after its rind was removed, mocking Slender's name and figure.

This comparison was apparently a common one. A variant is found as early as 1538, when James Dyer reported that a judge in the Court of Common Pleas pithily "compared the case to a Banbury cheese, which is worth little when the parings are cut off. And here the case is brief in substance, if the superfluous trifling that is pleaded be taken away". A similar insult is made in Jack Dunn's Entertainment (1601): "Put off your clothes and you are like a Banbury cheese—nothing but paring".

== See also ==
- History of cheese
- List of cheeses

== Sources ==
- Beesley, Alfred (1841). The History of Banbury. London: Nichols & Son.
- "Banbury Cheese". The Foods of England Project.
- Crossley, Alan, ed. (1972). "Banbury: Economic history". A History of the County of Oxford: Volume 10, Banbury Hundred. Victoria County History (VCH). London. pp. 49–71 – via British History Online.
- "7 Shakespearean Insults to Make Life More Interesting". Merriam-Webster.
- Page, William, ed. (1907). "Industries". A History of the County of Oxford: Volume 2. Victoria County History (VCH). London. pp. 225–277 – via British History Online.
- Parmiter, Geoffrey de C. (Autumn 1979). "A Judicial Opinion of Banbury Cheese" (PDF). Cake and Cockhorse. 8 (1): 11. ISSN 0522-0823.
- Thomas, Martin (Spring 2012). "As Thin as Banbury's Cheese". Cake and Cockhorse. 18 (8): 274–276. ISSN 0522-0823.
- Timbs, John (16 May 1863). "Banbury Cakes and Banbury Cross" . Once a Week. Vol. 8. London: Bradbury & Evans. pp. 583–585.
- Trinder, B. S. (Winter 1968). "Banbury Fair in the 19th Century" (PDF). Cake and Cockhorse. 4 (2): 29–31. ISSN 0522-0823.
- Trinder, B. S. (Spring 1970). "Banbury Cheese" (PDF). Cake and Cockhorse. 4 (7): 114. ISSN 0522-0823.
