= Nantwich Walled Garden =

Coordinates: 53°04′06″N 2°31′46″W

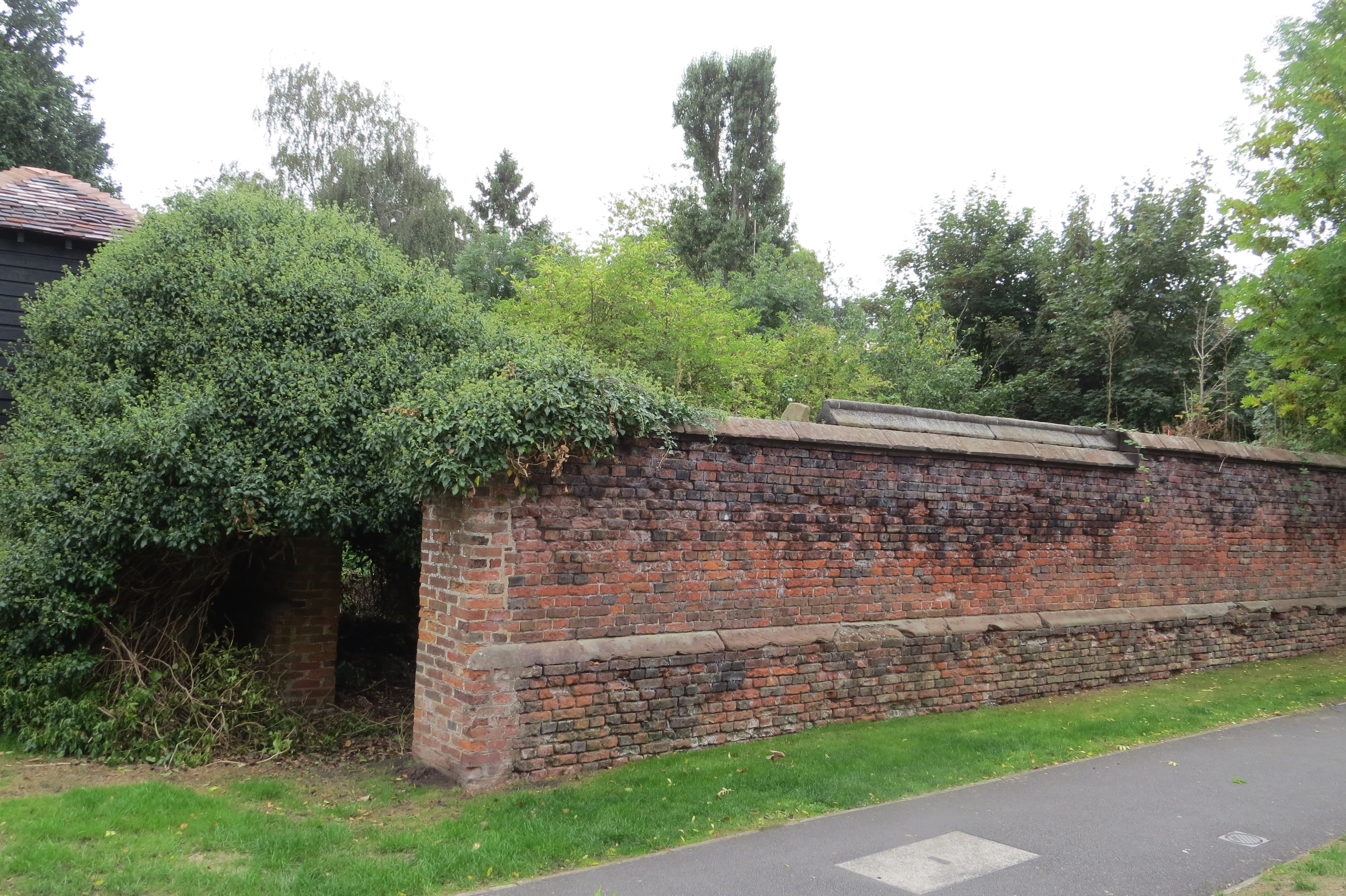
Part of the north wall of Nantwich Walled Garden

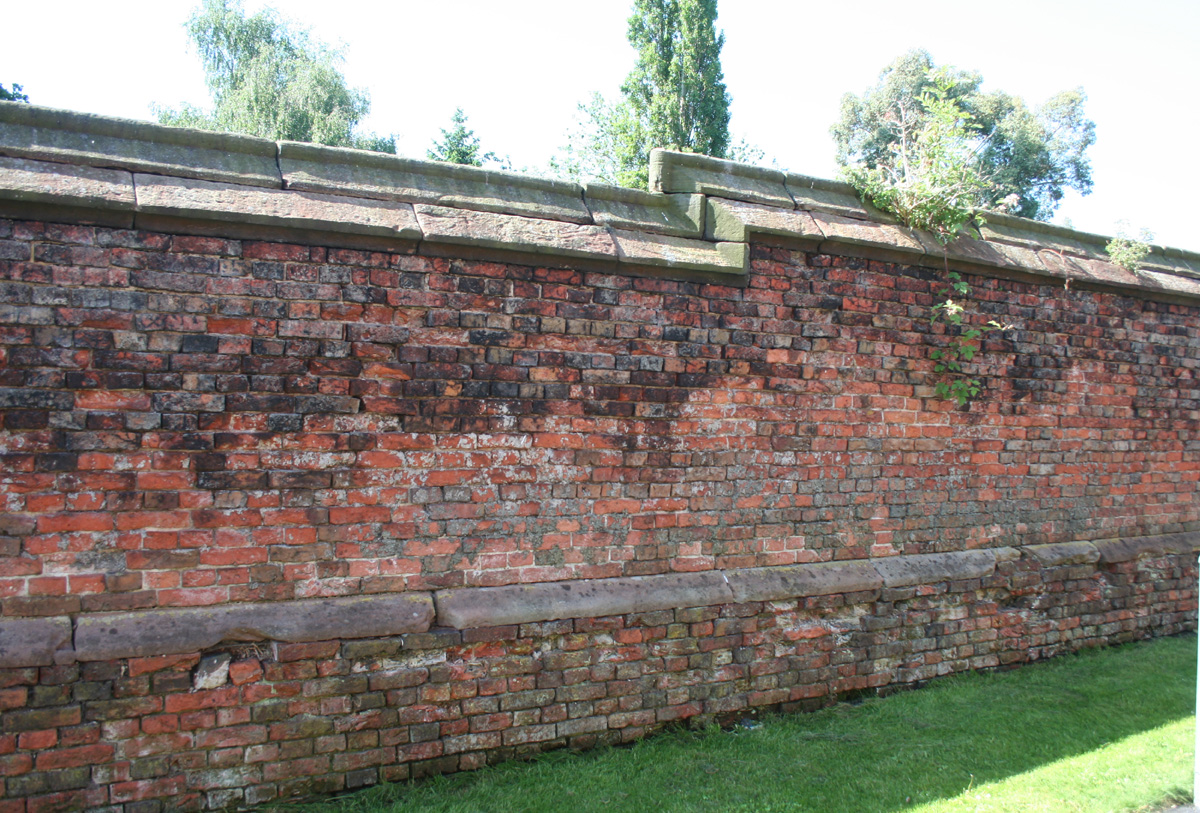
Detail showing decorative coping

Nantwich Walled Garden is a disused walled garden in the town of Nantwich, Cheshire, UK. It occupies approximately half an acre (0.2 hectares) north of 82 to 96 Welsh Row.

== History ==
The garden was built between 1575 and 1580 by the Wilbraham family, adjoining their property Townsend House (now demolished), off Welsh Row. It is surrounded by a grade II listed early-17th-century wall.

== Architectural features ==
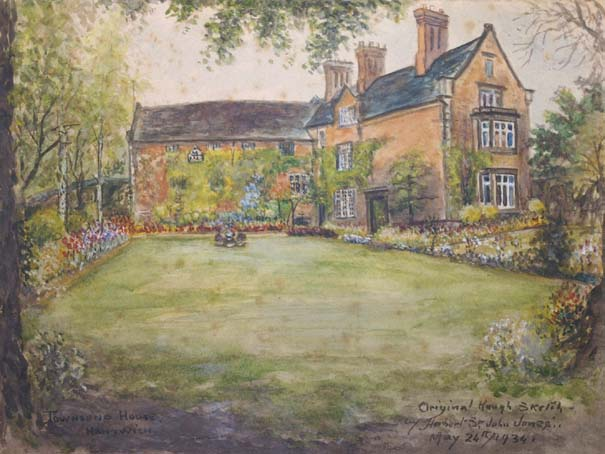
Townsend House by Herbert St. John Jones, May 1934

The walls surrounding the gardens feature three bee boles, examples of a predecessor to the modern beehive. Other features of note include projecting plinths, ashlar dressing and decorative copings. The walls are constructed primarily of hand-made clamp bricks (250 mm wide x 50 mm high x 120 mm deep) set in lime mortar and the dressings are made of red sandstone.

The walled garden's bee boles are recorded in the IBRA Bee Boles Register.

== Nantwich Walled Garden Society ==
The garden is currently owned by property developers. The Nantwich Walled Garden Society (NWGS) believe that the best option for the garden would be for it to be restored for the benefit of the local community and visitors to the region. The society holds meetings in Nantwich and publish newsletters with news and updates relating to the Nantwich Walled Garden. The society has suggested that the restored garden should be a tribute to John Gerard, a botanist and herbalist who was born in Nantwich.

Nantwich walled garden was featured in an exhibition at Nantwich Museum, "Welsh Row Through the Ages", which ran from mid-July to mid-October 2018, and there is also a permanent display of information about NWGS in the entrance to the museum.

== See also ==
- Listed buildings in Nantwich
