= Nantwich Museum =

Museum in Nantwich, Cheshire, England

Coordinates: 53.0657°N 2.5209°W

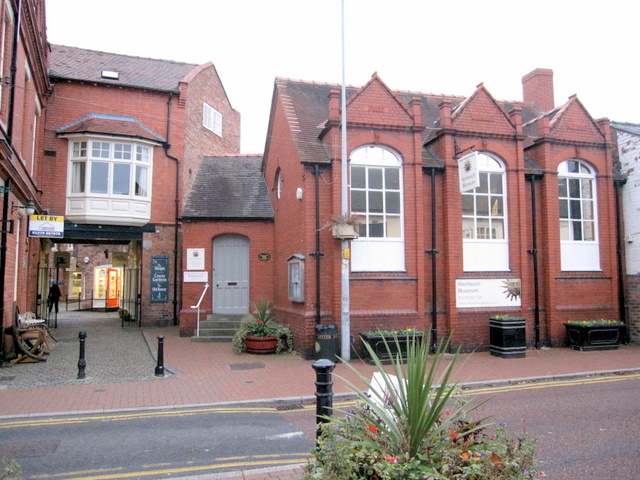
Nantwich Museum and the entrance to the adjacent Cocoa Yard in 2009

Nantwich Museum is a local museum in the town of Nantwich, Cheshire, northwest England, founded in 1980. The museum is housed in the former public library, dating from 1888. Collections focus on Cheshire's role in the English Civil War, and the area's history of salt production and cheese-making, as well as the manufacture of shoes, clothing and clocks.

== Location and history ==
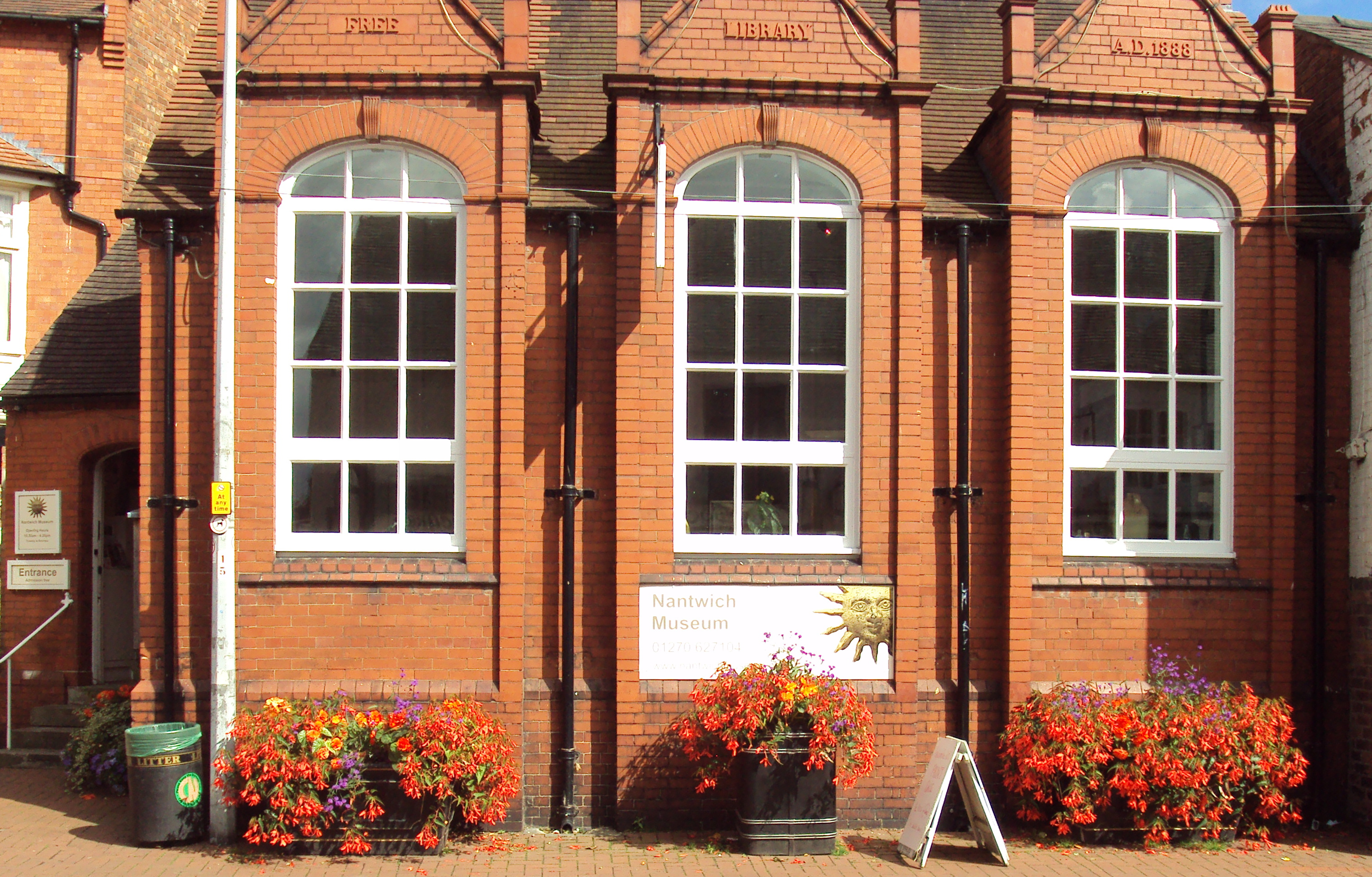
Nantwich Museum front

The museum is located in Pillory Street in the centre of Nantwich. It is housed in the former public library of the town, which was built on the location of the former jail. The red-brick building was designed by Thomas Bower and dates from 1888. The museum was founded in January 1980.

== Collections ==
The museum's galleries present the history of Nantwich, including Roman salt making, the Great Fire in Nantwich in Tudor times (1583), the Battle of Nantwich (1644) during the English Civil War, and the local shoe and clothing industries, as well as clock making.

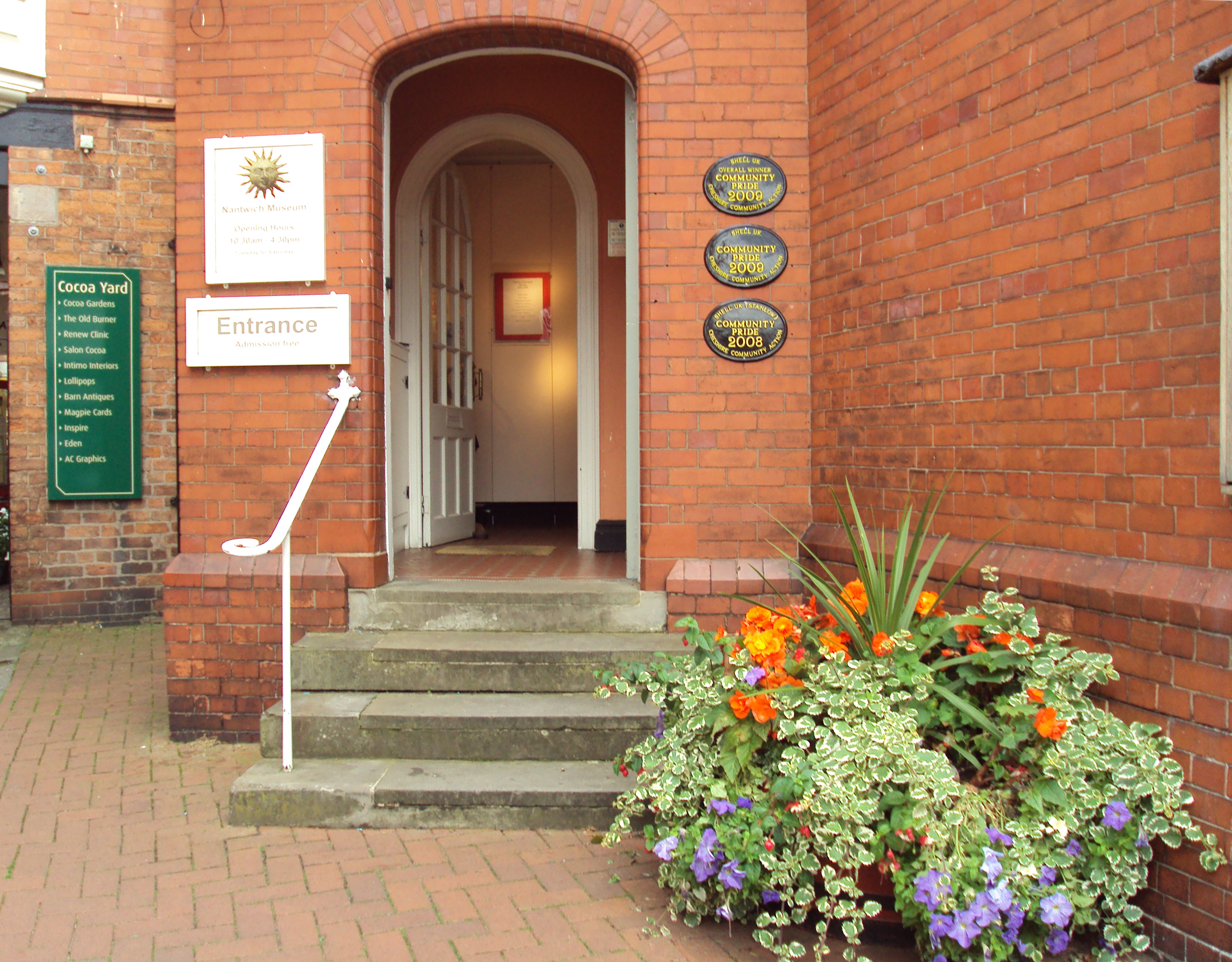
Nantwich Museum entrance

There are two extensions to the museum. In one there is a cheese-making exhibition together with the Joseph Heler meeting room, presenting the history of Cheshire cheese, especially with respect to Nantwich. There is a community gallery for art exhibitions, and the Millennium Gallery used for temporary exhibitions. Artworks on display include Mr Walsh's Perdita, with jockey up, on Nantwich Racecourse by Benjamin Killingbeck, the only surviving portrayal of Nantwich Racecourse known, a portrait of local historian James Hall by his son, Walter J. Hall, and works by the Nantwich artist Herbert St John Jones (1872–1939). The museum also has a collection of maps. In April 2019, the Cheshire Civil War Centre opened at the museum.

The museum is open Tuesday to Saturday. Entrance is free. Funding is provided by Cheshire East Council and Nantwich Town Council, as well as local fundraising.

== See also ==
- List of museums in Cheshire
- History of cheese
- Salt in Cheshire
- Gabriel Smith (d.1743)
