= Peter Bayley (poet) =

English writer and poet

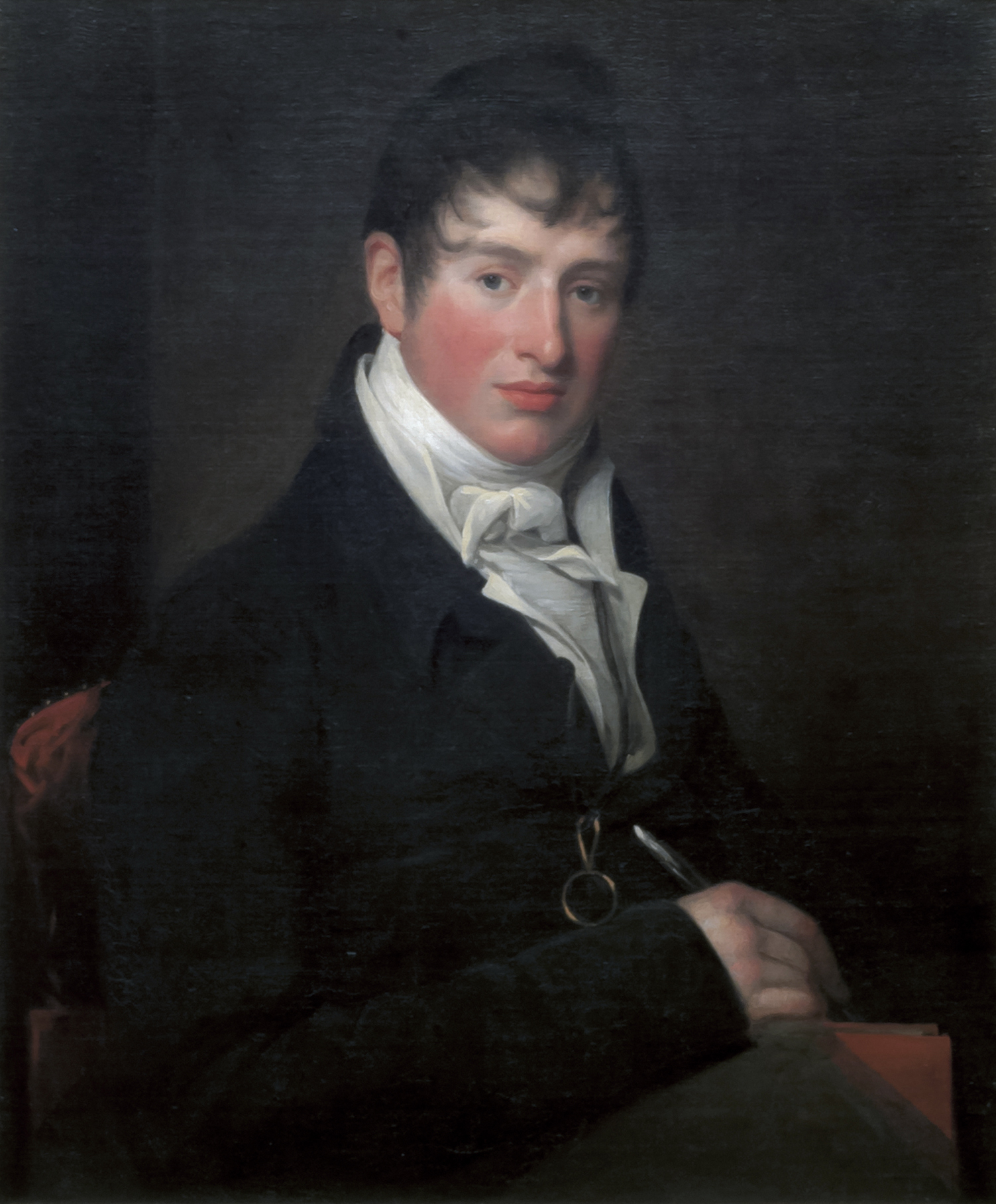
- Baptised: September 1, 1778
- Died: January 25, 1823 (aged 44–45)
- Occupation: Poet
- Parents: Peter Bayley (father); Sarah Bayley (mother)

Peter Bayley (baptised 1 September 1778 – 25 January 1823) was an English writer and poet.

== Life ==
Bayley was the son of Peter Bayley, a solicitor at Nantwich, and his wife, Sarah. In 1790, he entered Rugby School, and in February 1796, at the age of 17, Merton College, Oxford. He did not take a degree. He was called to the bar at the Temple, but made no serious effort to pursue his profession. His interest in music and the drama rendered him neglectful of the dictates of prudence. "Instead of following the law," he, as it was said, "allowed the law to follow him," until he found himself in prison for debt. Subsequently, he turned his attention to literature, and became editor of the Museum, a weekly periodical. He died suddenly on his way to the opera, on 25 January 1823.

== Works ==
Bayley published a volume of poems in 1803, and, besides contributing occasional verses to periodicals, printed for private circulation, at an early period, several specimens of an epic poem founded on the conquest of Wales, which appeared posthumously in 1824 under the title of 'Idwal.' In 1820, under the pseudonym of Giorgione di Castel Chiuso, he published a volume of verse, entitled Sketches from St George's-in-the-Fields, containing clever and graphic descriptions of various phases of London life and therefore possessing now considerable antiquarian and social interest. A second series appeared in 1821. A posthumous volume of Poetry by Bayley was published in 1824, and on 20 April 1825 a tragedy, Orestes, left by him in manuscript, was brought out at Covent Garden with Charles Kemble in the principal part, one of the most successful of Kemble's impersonations.
