= Nethercote, Banbury =

Hamlet in Oxfordshire, England

Coordinates: 52.0676°N 1.3050°W

Nethercote
- Location within Oxfordshire
- OS grid reference: SP47514138
  - London: 77 miles (124 km)
- Civil parish: Banbury
- District: Cherwell
- Shire county: Oxfordshire
- Region: South East
- Country: England
- Sovereign state: United Kingdom
- Post town: Banbury
- Postcode district: OX17
- Dialling code: 01295
- Police: Thames Valley
- Fire: Oxfordshire
- Ambulance: South Central
- UK Parliament: Banbury

Nethercote is a hamlet in the civil parish of Banbury in Oxfordshire, England. It lies close to the border with West Northamptonshire. The hamlet sits south-east of junction 11 of the M40, south of the A422 and east of the M40. Predominantly agricultural land used for grazing, a single-track road runs right through the hamlet, known as Banbury Lane, which has around a dozen residential properties along the lane. Banbury Lane is still often referred to as Blacklocks Hill and this refers to the history of the area and a time when this area saw a main route into Banbury, before the M40 and A422.

== History ==
The name Nethercote is thought to have derived from the proximity to Warkworth. The word Nethercote is derived from the Middle English words “nether(e)” meaning “lower” and “cot” meaning cottage.

There is some evidence of a deserted medieval village at Nethercote, lying to the south of the modern hamlet.

The hamlet of Huscote lay north of Nethercote. Today, there only remains a farm in that area. There are 35 tree preservation orders on Huscote Farm today.

Throughout the Middle Ages until the mid-eighteenth century, Nethercote and the neighbouring hamlets of Grimsbury and Huscote were the centre of Banbury's cheese making trade. The cheese was made from local resources and much prized at the time, although there is little mention of it by the nineteenth century.

Klaus Fuchs is said to have handed over the secret formula of the atom bomb to a Russian spy on a bench in Nethercote in 1945.

=== Administrative history ===
Nethercote and the neighbouring hamlet of Grimsbury formed part of the ancient parish of Banbury. The parish historically straddled the boundary between Oxfordshire and Northamptonshire, which followed the River Cherwell; most of the parish was west of the river in Oxfordshire, but Nethercote and Grimsbury were in Northamptonshire, being east of the river. For the purposes of administering the poor laws from the 17th century onwards, the Northamptonshire part of Banbury parish, including Nethercote, was jointly administered with the neighbouring parish of Warkworth. In 1866 the legal definition of 'parish' was changed to be the areas used for administering the poor laws, and so Nethercote was thereafter part of the civil parish of Warkworth, whilst remaining part of the ecclesiastical parish of Banbury.

Nethercote was included in the parliamentary borough (constituency) of Banbury from 1832. Nethercote was also included in the Banbury local board district from the district's creation in 1852, with the local board being responsible for various local government functions including sewers and public health. The Northamptonshire parts of the Banbury local board district, including Nethercote, were transferred from Northamptonshire to Oxfordshire in 1889. Later that year, the municipal borough of Banbury was enlarged to cover the whole of the local board district, and the local board's functions were transferred to the borough council.

The 1889 reforms did not affect civil parish boundaries, and so after 1889 Warkworth parish straddled Northamptonshire and the borough of Banbury in Oxfordshire. The Local Government Act 1894 directed that parishes could no longer straddle borough or county boundaries, and so a new civil parish of Grimsbury was created in 1894 from the part of Warkworth parish within the borough; Nethercote was part of the new Grimsbury civil parish. As an urban parish, Grimsbury was directly administered by the borough council rather than having its own parish council. The civil parish of Grimsbury was abolished in 1932 when the three parishes within the borough were united into a single parish of Banbury covering the same area as the borough.

== Heritage ==
Home Farmhouse in Nethercote is a Grade II Listed Building.

There are currently twenty two Tree preservation orders made on trees in Nethercote.

== Recreation and Access To Green Space ==
As well as Banbury Lane itself, there are numerous public footpaths running through Nethercote.

== Road Traffic Orders ==
In 2004, Thames Valley Police raised a road traffic order preventing vehicular access to the hamlet from the A422.

== See also ==
- History of Banbury
- Banbury cheese
- Huscote, Banbury
