= Huscote, Banbury =

Coordinates: 52.079084°N 1.3043100°W

Huscote
- Location within Oxfordshire
- OS grid reference: SP477425
  - London: 77 miles (124 km)
- Civil parish: Banbury
- District: Cherwell
- Shire county: Oxfordshire
- Region: South East
- Country: England
- Sovereign state: United Kingdom
- Post town: Banbury
- Postcode district: OX17
- Dialling code: 01295
- Police: Thames Valley
- Fire: Oxfordshire
- Ambulance: South Central
- UK Parliament: Banbury

Huscote was a tiny hamlet on the edge of north Oxfordshire, a rural area bordering with West Northamptonshire. The hamlet sits East of J11 of the M40. Predominantly agricultural land used for grazing. Census returns from the 1800s show houses at Huscote, but today only Huscote Farm remains

There are 42 tree preservation orders on Huscote Farm today

== See also ==
- History of Banbury
- Banbury Cheese
- Nethercote, Banbury
