= Nantwich =

Market town in Cheshire, England

Coordinates: 53°04′00″N 2°31′19″W

- Town
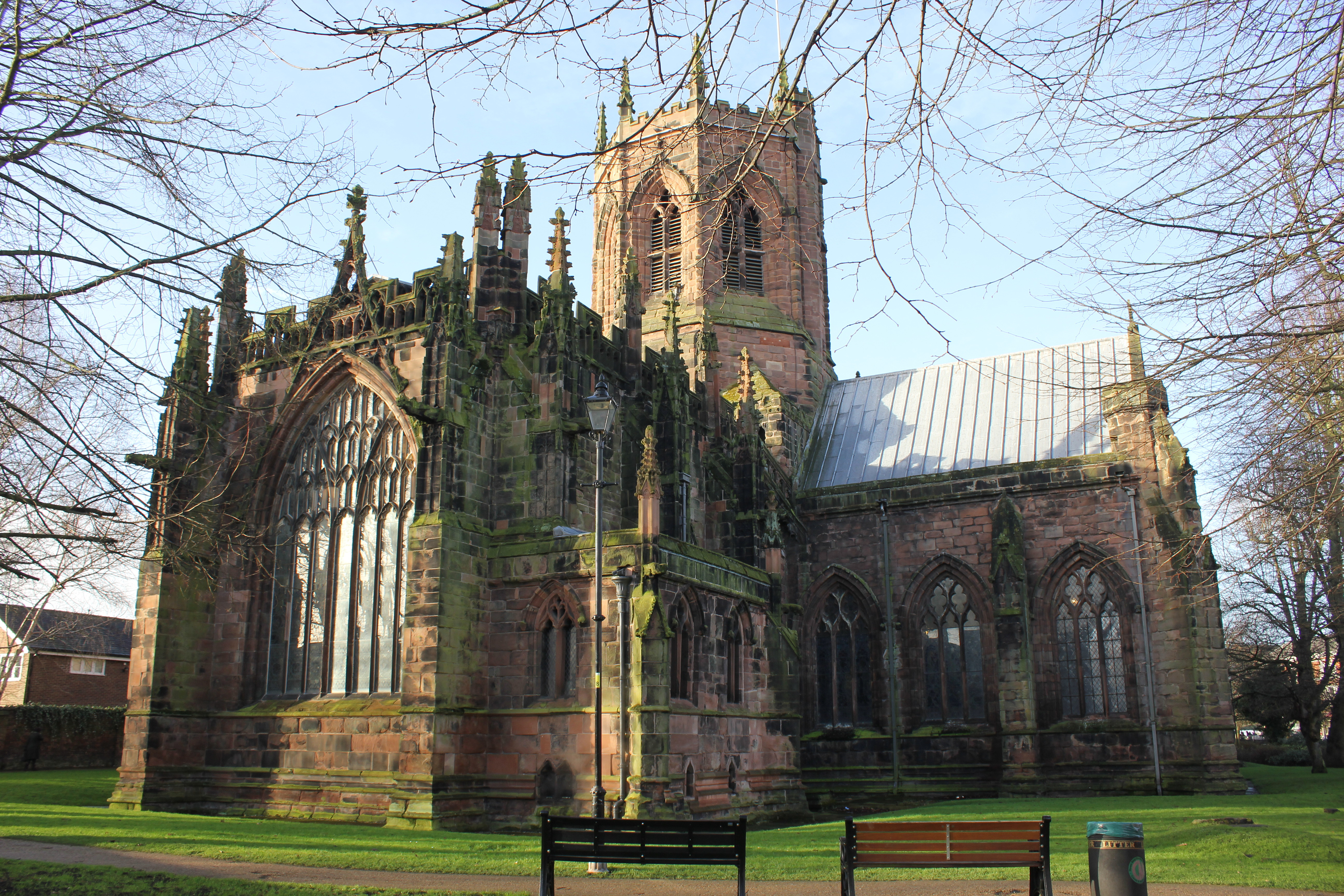
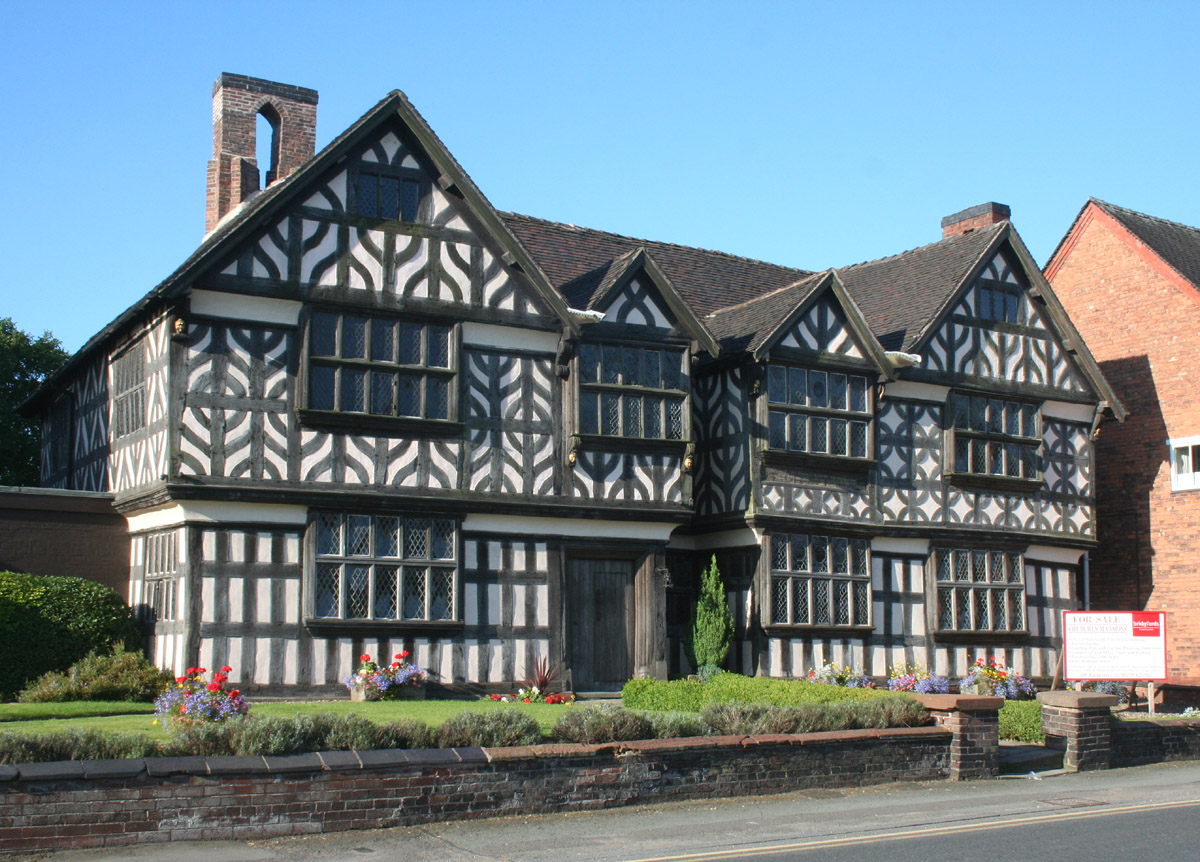
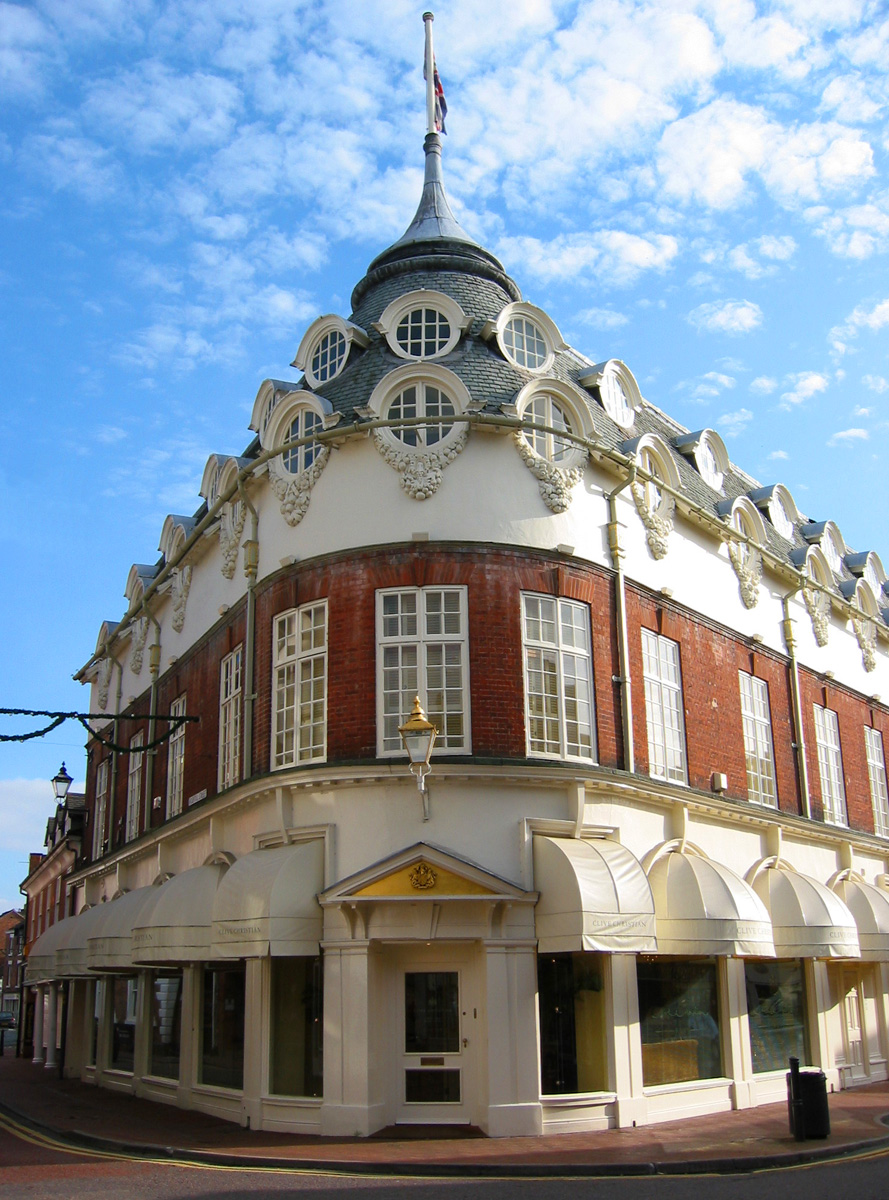
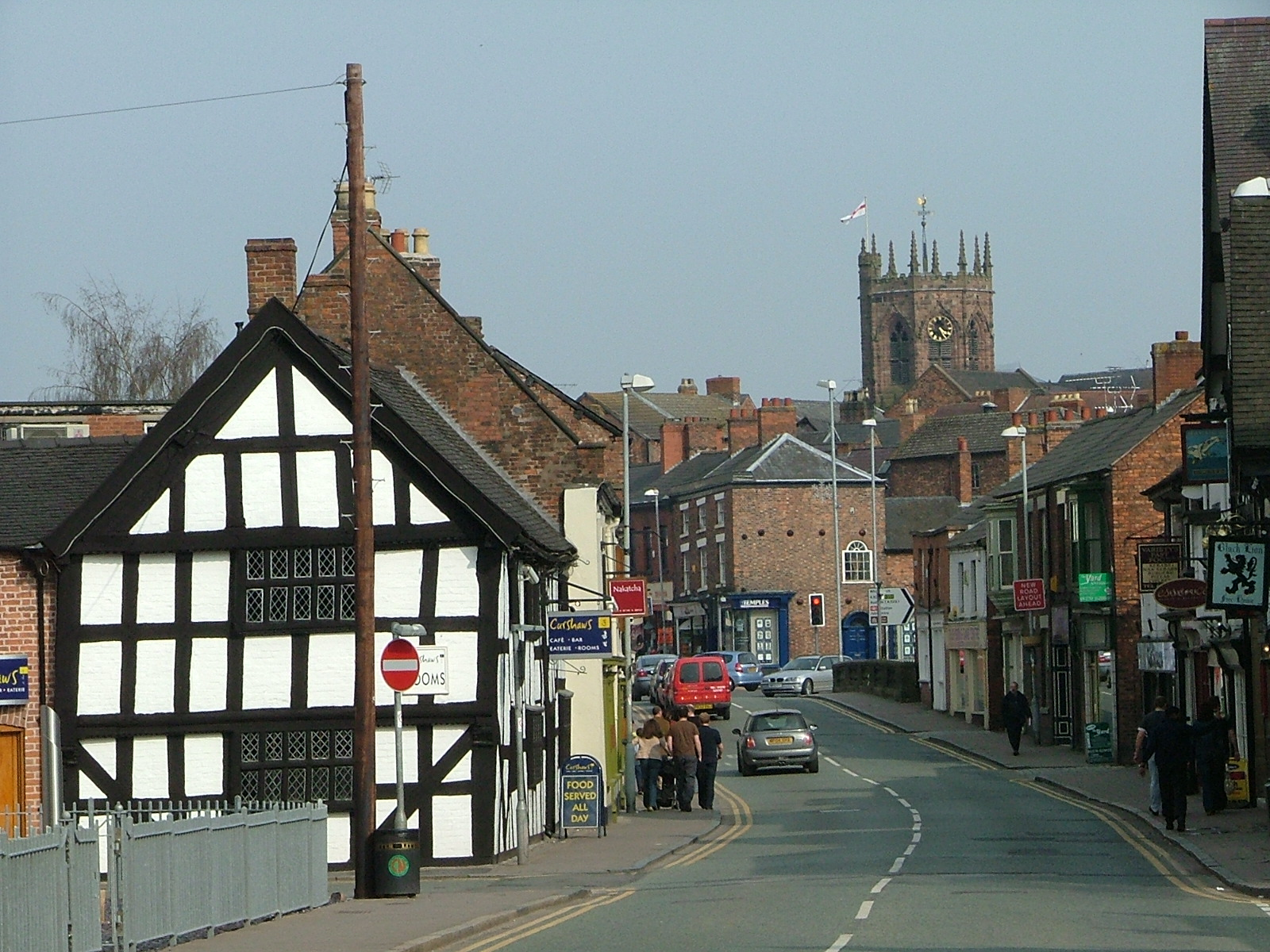
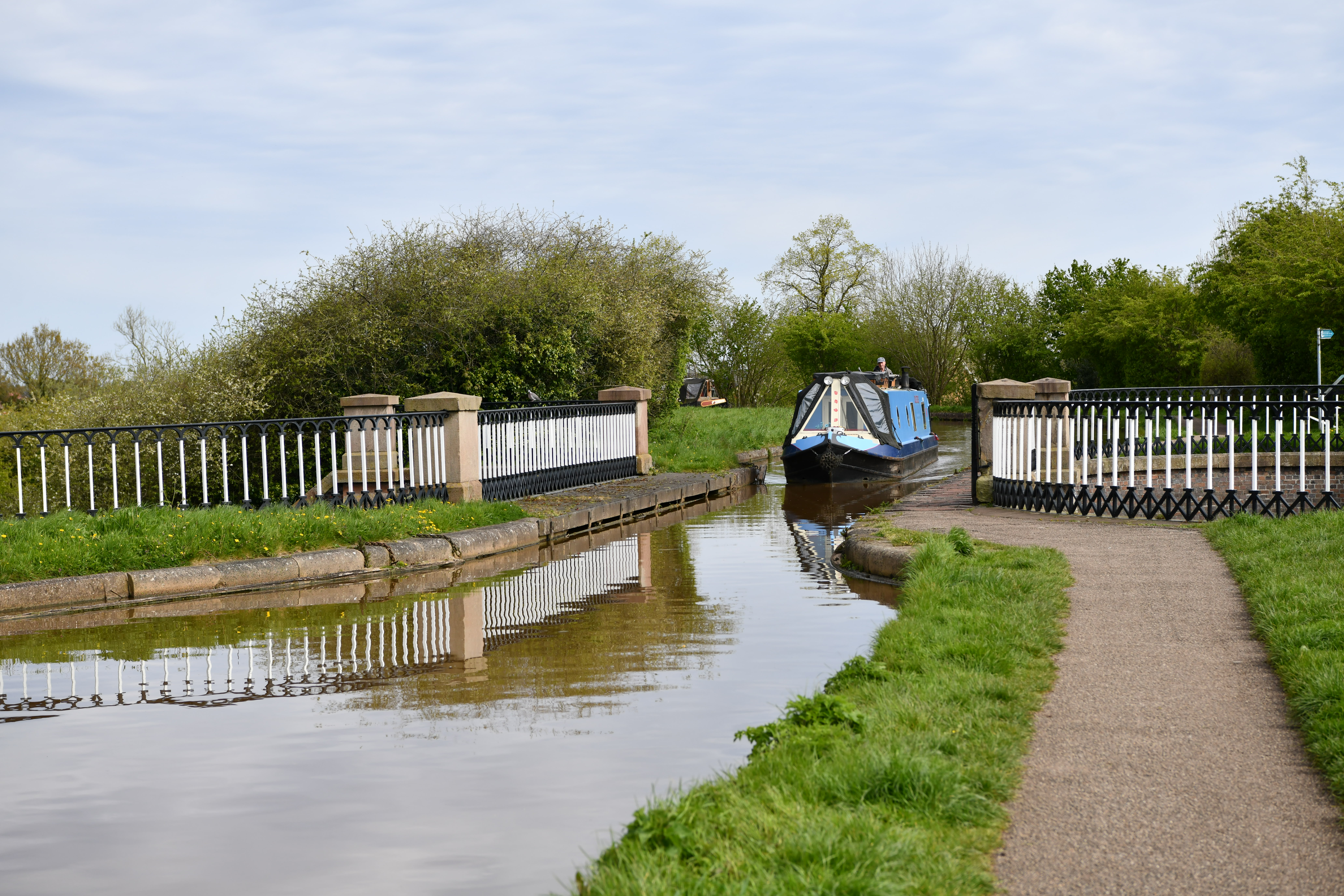
- St Mary's Church Churche's Mansion 1–5 Pillory Street Welsh Row Nantwich Aqueduct

- Location within Cheshire
- Population: 14,045 (Parish, 2021); 18,740 (Built up area, 2021)
- OS grid reference: SJ652523
- Civil parish: Nantwich
- Unitary authority: Cheshire East
- Ceremonial county: Cheshire
- Region: North West
- Country: England
- Sovereign state: United Kingdom
- Post town: NANTWICH
- Postcode district: CW5
- Dialling code: 01270
- Police: Cheshire
- Fire: Cheshire
- Ambulance: North West
- UK Parliament: Crewe and Nantwich
- Website: nantwichtowncouncil.gov.uk

Nantwich (/ˈnæntwɪtʃ/ NAN-twitch) is a market town and civil parish in the unitary authority of Cheshire East in Cheshire, England. It has among the highest concentrations of listed buildings in England, with notably good examples of Tudor and Georgian architecture. At the 2021 census, the parish had a population of 14,045 and the built up area had a population of 18,740.

== History ==
The origins of the settlement date to Roman times, when salt from Nantwich was used by the Roman garrisons at Chester (Deva Victrix) and Stoke-on-Trent as a preservative and a condiment. Salt has been used in the production of Cheshire cheese and in the tanning industry, both products of the dairy industry based in the Cheshire Plain around the town. Nant comes from the Welsh for brook or stream. Wich and wych are names used to denote brine springs or wells. In 1194 there is a reference to the town as being called Nametwihc, which would indicate it was once the site of a pre-Roman Celtic nemeton or sacred grove.

In the Domesday Book of 1086, Nantwich is recorded as having eight salt houses. It had a castle and was the capital of a barony of the earls of Chester, and of one of the seven hundreds of medieval Cheshire. Nantwich is one of the few places in Cheshire to be marked on the Gough Map, which dates from 1355 to 1366. It was first recorded as an urban area at the time of the Norman Conquest, when the Normans burnt the town to the ground, leaving only one building standing.

Nantwich Castle was built at the crossing of the Weaver before 1180, probably near where the Crown Inn now stands. Although nothing remains of the castle above ground, it affected the town's layout. During the medieval period, Nantwich was the most important salt town and probably the second most important settlement in the county after Chester. By the 14th century, it was holding a weekly cattle market at the end of what is now Beam Street, and it was also important for its tanning industry centred in Barker Street.

A fire in December 1583 destroyed most of the town to the east of the Weaver. Elizabeth I contributed funds to the town's rebuilding and made an England-wide appeal for support for the rebuilding fund which thereby received funds from many successful medieval towns, including Bury St Edmunds in Suffolk. The rebuilding occurred rapidly and followed the plan of the destroyed town. Beam Street was so renamed to reflect the fact that timber (including wood from Delamere Forest) to rebuild the town was transported along it. A plaque marking the 400th anniversary of the fire and of Nantwich's rebuilding was unveiled by the Duke of Gloucester on 20 September 1984.

From the time of the Henrician Reformation, the town had trouble finding good Protestant preachers. An example of the problem was Stephen Jerome, a puritanical preacher, who in 1625 nonetheless tried to rape one of his maidservants, Margaret Knowsley. Rumours of this spread across the town, eventually leading to Knowsley's imprisonment and public shaming in 1627. A few years later, Jerome went to Ireland to continue his preaching career.

During the English Civil War Nantwich declared for Parliament and was besieged several times by Royalist forces. A final six-week siege was lifted after a Parliamentary victory in the Battle of Nantwich on 26 January 1644. This has been re-enacted as "Holly Holy Day" on every anniversary since 1973 by Sealed Knot, an educational charity. The name is taken from commemorative sprigs of holly worn by townsfolk in caps or on clothing in the years after the battle.

The salt industry peaked in the mid-16th century, with about 400 salt houses in 1530, but had almost died out by the end of the 18th century; the last salt house closed in the mid-19th century. Nikolaus Pevsner considered the salt-industry decline to have been critical in preserving the town's historic buildings. The last tannery closed in 1974. The town's location on the London–Chester road meant that Nantwich began to serve the needs of travellers in medieval times. This trade declined in the 19th century with the opening of Telford's road from London to Holyhead, which offered a faster route to Wales, and later with the Grand Junction Railway, which bypassed the town.

=== Nantwich Mill ===
The presence of a watermill south of Nantwich Bridge was noted in 1228 and again about 1363, through the cutting of a mill race or leat and creation of an upstream weir. The resulting Mill Island was ascribed to the 16th century, possibly after the original mill was destroyed in the 1583 Great Fire of Nantwich.

In the mid-17th century, the mill was acquired by local landowners, the Cholmondeleys, who retained it until the 1840s. Originally a corn mill, it became a cotton mill (Bott's Mill) from 1789 to 1874, but reverted to being a corn mill and was recorded as such on the Ordnance Survey First Edition map of Nantwich in 1876. A turbine was installed in about 1890 to replace the water wheel.

The mill was demolished in the 1970s after a fire and then landscaped, with further stabilisation of the mill foundations in 2008. Today it forms part of a riverside park area. Proposals, so far unfollowed, have been made for small-scale hydropower generation using the mill race. Nantwich Mill Hydro Generation Ltd was incorporated in April 2009, but dormant in December 2016.

=== Brine baths ===
Nantwich's brine springs were used for spa or hydrotherapy purposes at two locations: the central Snow Hill swimming pool inaugurated in 1883, where the open-air brine pool is still in use, and the Brine Baths Hotel, standing in 70 acres (28 ha) of parkland south of the town from the 1890s to the mid-20th century. The hotel was originally a mansion, Shrewbridge Hall, built for Michael Bott (owner of Nantwich Mill) in 1828. It was bought by Nantwich Brine and Medicinal Baths Company in 1883, extended and opened as a hotel in 1893, with "a well-appointed suite of brine and medicinal baths," – also described as the "strongest saline baths in the world". These were used to treat patients with ailments that included gout, rheumatism, sciatica and neuritis, using two suites of baths.

The hotel's grounds included gardens, tennis courts, a nine-hole golf course and a bowling green. The last survives today as the Nantwich Park Road Bowling Club founded in 1906.

The hotel served as an auxiliary hospital during the First World War. In the Second World War it became an army base and then accommodated WAAF personnel. It closed as a hotel in 1947 and in 1948 became a convalescent home for miners. In 1952 that closed and the building was unsuccessfully put up for sale and demolished in 1959. The grounds were later developed for housing – the Brine Baths Estate – and schools (Brine Leas School and Weaver Primary School).

== Governance ==
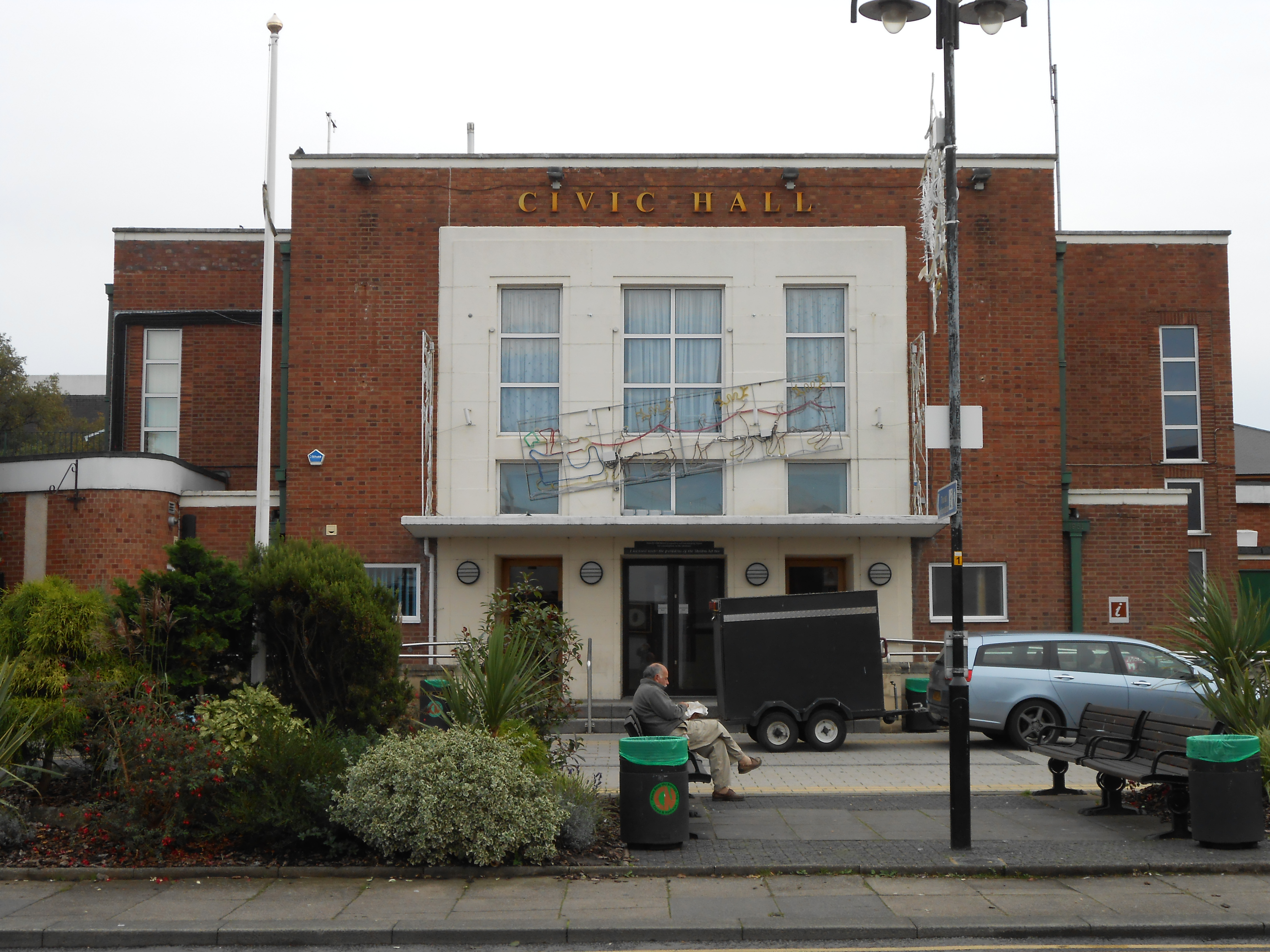
The Nantwich Civic Hall

There are two tiers of local government covering Nantwich, at civil parish (town) and unitary authority level: Nantwich Town Council and Cheshire East Council. The town council is based at the Civic Hall on Market Street. Parts of the built up area extend into neighbouring parishes, notably Stapeley and District to the south-east.

For national elections, the town is mostly in the Crewe and Nantwich constituency, though some western parts are in the Chester South and Eddisbury constituency. A Nantwich constituency covering the town and surrounding rural areas existed between 1955 and 1983.

=== Administrative history ===
Nantwich was anciently part of the parish of Acton. Nantwich had a chapel of ease from at least the 12th century, which was rebuilt as the current St Mary's Church in the 14th century. It is unclear exactly when Nantwich became a separate parish from Acton, although it was treated as a separate parish by 1677.

The parish of Nantwich contained the townships of Alvaston, Leighton and Woolstanwood, as well as a Nantwich township covering the town itself and adjoining areas, plus western fringes of the township of Willaston. From the 17th century onwards, parishes were gradually given various civil functions under the poor laws, in addition to their original ecclesiastical functions. In some cases, including Nantwich, the civil functions were exercised by each township separately rather than the parish as a whole. In 1866, the legal definition of 'parish' was changed to be the areas used for administering the poor laws, and so the townships also became civil parishes.

In 1850, the Nantwich township was also made a local board district, administered by an elected local board. Such districts were reconstituted as urban districts under the Local Government Act 1894. The urban district was enlarged in 1936, taking in areas from several neighbouring parishes.

Nantwich Urban District Council moved its offices to Brookfield House on Shrewbridge Road in 1949. It also built the Civic Hall on Market Street to serve as a public hall and entertainment venue, opening in 1951. The town's previous main public hall had been the privately owned Town Hall beside Nantwich Bridge on the High Street, which was built in 1868 and closed by 1945; it was demolished in 1972.

Nantwich Urban District was abolished in 1974 under the Local Government Act 1972. The area became part of the larger borough of Crewe and Nantwich, also covering the nearby town of Crewe and surrounding rural areas. The government originally proposed calling the new borough Crewe, but the shadow authority elected in 1973 to oversee the transition changed the name to 'Crewe and Nantwich' before the new arrangements came into effect. A successor parish covering the area of the former Nantwich Urban District was created at the same time, with its parish council taking the name Nantwich Town Council.

In 2009, Cheshire East Council was created, taking over the functions of Crewe and Nantwich Borough Council and Cheshire County Council, which were both abolished.

== Places of interest ==
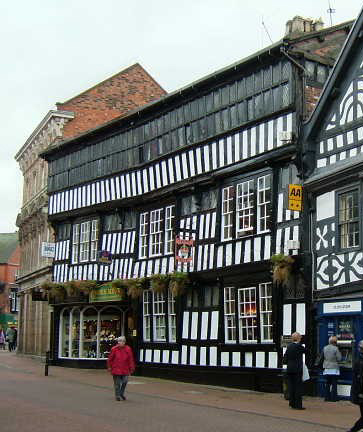
Crown Hotel

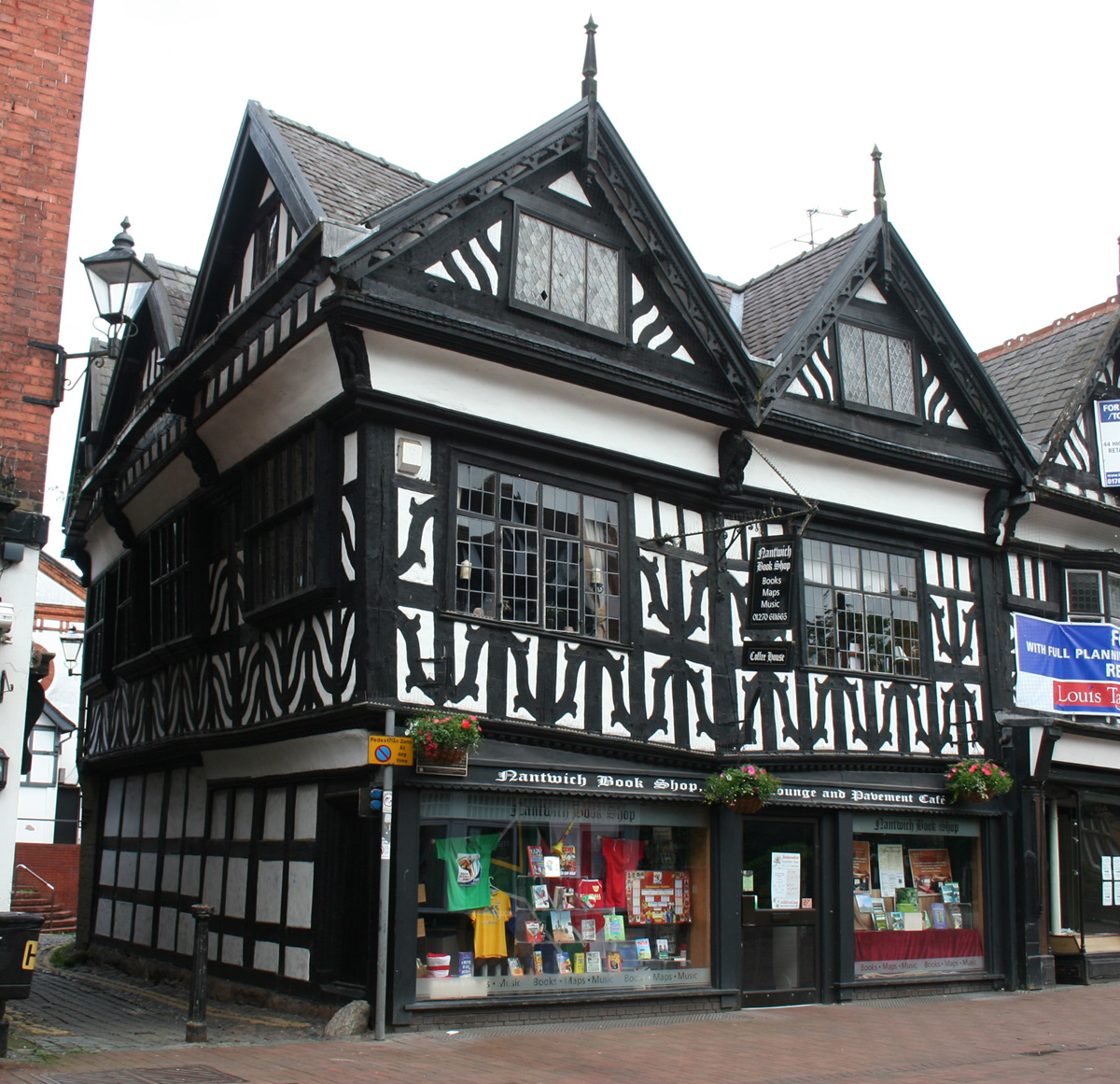
46 High Street

Nantwich has one of the county's largest collections of historic buildings, second only to Chester. These cluster mainly in the town centre on Barker Street, Beam Street, Churchyard Side, High Street and Hospital Street, and extend across the Weaver on Welsh Row. Most are within the 38 hectares (94 acres) of conservation area, which broadly follows the bounds of the late medieval and early post-medieval town.

The oldest listed building is the 14th-century St Mary's Church, which is listed Grade I. Two other listed buildings are known to predate the fire of 1583: Sweetbriar Hall and the Grade I-listed Churche's Mansion, both timber-framed Elizabethan mansion houses. A few years after the fire, William Camden described Nantwich as the "best built town in the county". Particularly fine timber-framed buildings from the town's rebuilding include 46 High Street and the Grade I-listed Crown coaching inn. Many half-timbered buildings, such as 140–142 Hospital Street, have been concealed behind brick or rendering. Nantwich contains many Georgian town houses, good examples being Dysart Buildings, 9 Mill Street, Townwell House and 83 Welsh Row. Several examples of Victorian corporate architecture are listed, including the former District Bank by Alfred Waterhouse. The most recent listed building is 1–5 Pillory Street, a curved corner block in 17th-century French style, which dates from 1911. Most of the town's listed buildings were originally residential, but churches, chapels, public houses, schools, banks, almshouses and workhouses are represented. Unusual listed structures include a mounting block, twelve cast-iron bollards, a stone gateway, two garden walls and a summerhouse.

Dorfold Hall is a Grade I listed Jacobean mansion in the nearby village of Acton, considered by Pevsner to be one of the two finest Jacobean houses in Cheshire. Its grounds accommodate Nantwich Show each summer, including, until 2021, the International Cheese Awards.

Nantwich Museum, in Pillory Street, has galleries on the history of the town, including Roman salt-making, Tudor Nantwich's Great Fire, the Civil War Battle of Nantwich (1644) and the more recent shoe, clothing and local cheese-making industries. Hack Green Secret Nuclear Bunker, a few miles outside the town, is a once government-owned nuclear bunker, now a museum. Also in Pillory Street is the 82-seat Nantwich Players Theatre, which puts on about five plays a year.

The Nantwich Millennium Clock, located in Cocoa Yard between Pillory Street and Hospital Street, is an art installation with a free-standing mechanical clock inside a glass case. The clock was made by Paul Beckett around 2001 to celebrate the new millennium.

The name of Jan Palach Avenue in the south of the town commemorates the self-immolation of a student in Czechoslovakia in 1969.

== Geography ==
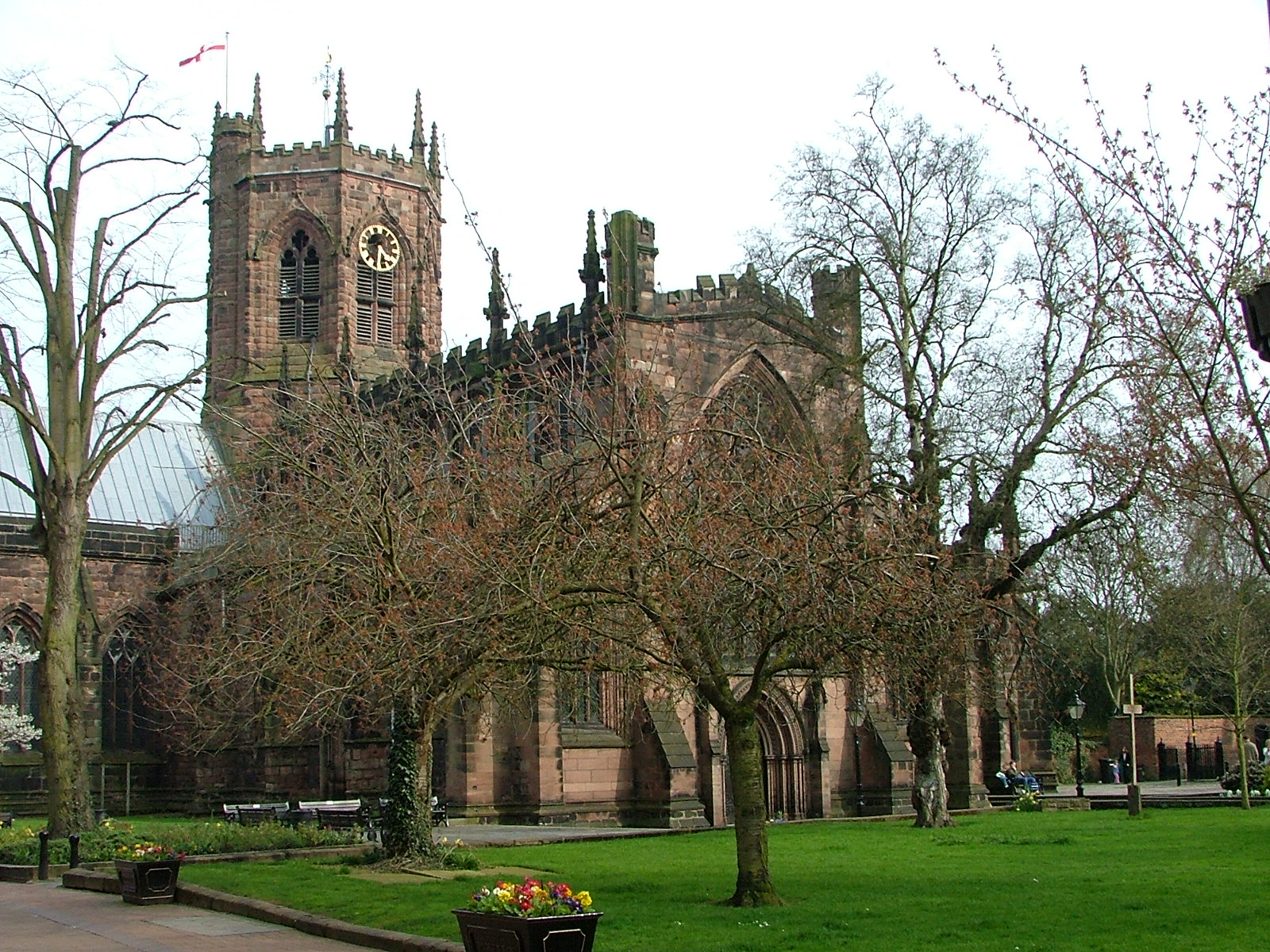
St Mary's Church

Nantwich is on the Cheshire Plain, on the banks of the River Weaver. The Shropshire Union Canal runs to the west of the town on an embankment, crossing the Acton lane on the western boundary of the town via an iron aqueduct. There is a basin nearby which is a frequent mooring for visitors to the town. It joins the Llangollen Canal at Hurleston to the north. The town is some four miles (six kilometres) southwest of Crewe, 20 mi (32 km) southeast of Chester and 22 mi (35 km) east of Wrexham. The town is served by a by-pass to the north and west into which, directly or indirectly, the A51, A500, A529, A530 and A534 roads all feed.

The stretch of A534 from Nantwich to the Welsh border is seen as one of the ten worst stretches of road in England for road safety.

The tower of St Mary's Church was the origin (meridian) of the 6-inch and 1:2500 Ordnance Survey maps of Cheshire.

== Public transport ==
Nantwich railway station is on the line between Crewe and Whitchurch, Shrewsbury and other towns along the Welsh border. It is served mainly by Transport for Wales trains running from Manchester Piccadilly and Crewe to Shrewsbury and onwards to stations in South Wales.

D&G Bus, Stagecoach and Mikro Coaches operate bus routes from Nantwich Bus Station and in and around Nantwich, some with funding from Cheshire East council.

== Education ==
The town has eight primary schools (Highfields Community, Willaston Primary Academy, Millfields, Pear Tree, St Anne's (Catholic), Stapeley Broad Lane (Church of England), The Weaver and Nantwich Primary Academy) and two secondary schools, Brine Leas School and Malbank School and Sixth Form College. Reaseheath College runs further education and higher education courses in conjunction with Harper Adams University and the University of Chester. A sixth-form college at Brine Leas opened in September 2010.

For the London 2012 Olympic Games, Malbank School and Sixth Form College was nominated to represent the North West.

== Sport ==
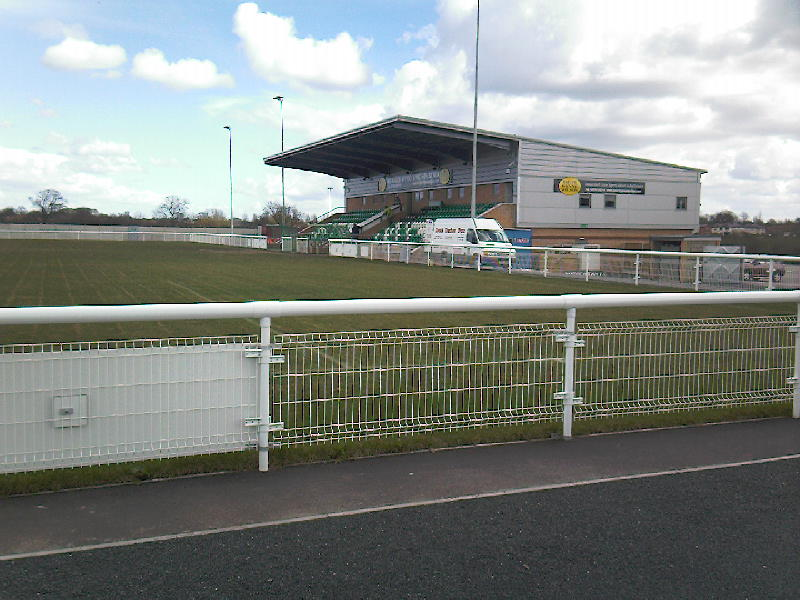
The Weaver Stadium

The town's football club, Nantwich Town, competes in and in 2006 won the FA Vase. It plays at the Weaver Stadium, opened in 2007.

Rugby union is played at two clubs. Crewe and Nantwich RUFC, founded in 1922, is based at Vagrants Sports Club in Newcastle Road, Willaston, and runs four senior teams including a ladies team; the first XV play in the Midlands 1 West (Level 6). It holds Club Mark and RFU Seal of Approval accreditations and has a mini and junior section of over 250 young people aged 5–18 taking part every Sunday, with a girls section. Acton Nomads RFC, founded in 2009, won the 2010 RFU Presidents XV "This is Rugby" Award; it operates two senior sides.

In rugby league, Crewe & Nantwich Steamers play at the Barony Park, Nantwich, also the home ground for Acton Nomads RFC.

The town's cricket club in Whitehouse Lane won the ECB-accredited Cheshire County Premier League title in 2010, 2011, 2012 and 2018. It regularly hosts Cheshire Minor County cricket matches. Midway through the 2017 season, bowler Jimmy Warrington became the first player in the history of the Cheshire County Premier League to take 500 wickets. In 2019, Nantwich reached the final of the ECB National Club Cricket Championship. In the final, played at Lord's, it met Swardeston and lost by 53 runs.

== Media ==
The daily Sentinel, weekly Nantwich Chronicle and Crewe and Nantwich Guardian, and monthly Dabber cover the town.

Local TV coverage is provided by BBC North West and ITV from the Winter Hill TV transmitter.

Radio stations for the Nantwich area include BBC Radio Stoke, Cheshire's Silk Radio from Macclesfield, Hits Radio Staffordshire & Cheshire and Greatest Hits Radio Staffordshire & Cheshire from Stoke-on-Trent, Crewe-based The Cat 107.9 community radio, and Nantwich-based online radio and networking organisation RedShift Radio.

The Nantwich News is a hyperlocal blog for local events and issues. The inNantwich website gives Nantwich information, including shops, firms, schools, wifi spots, car parking and toilets.

== Events ==
=== Cheese awards ===
Until 2019, the annual International Cheese Awards were held in July each year during Nantwich Show, at the Dorfold Hall estate. In 2021 it was announced the Awards would be moving to the Staffordshire Show Grounds and would no longer be part of the Nantwich Show event.

=== Jazz and blues ===
Since 1996, Nantwich has hosted an annual Nantwich Jazz and Blues Festival over the Easter Bank Holiday weekend. Jazz and blues artists from around the country perform in pubs and venues.

=== Food festival ===
The annual Nantwich Food Festival is held in the town centre on the first weekend of September. Re-established as a free-entry festival in 2010, it attracts numerous artisan producers from the local area and further afield, and offers chef demonstrations, family activities and entertainment. It draws some 30,000 visitors a year.

== Notable people ==
=== Public service ===
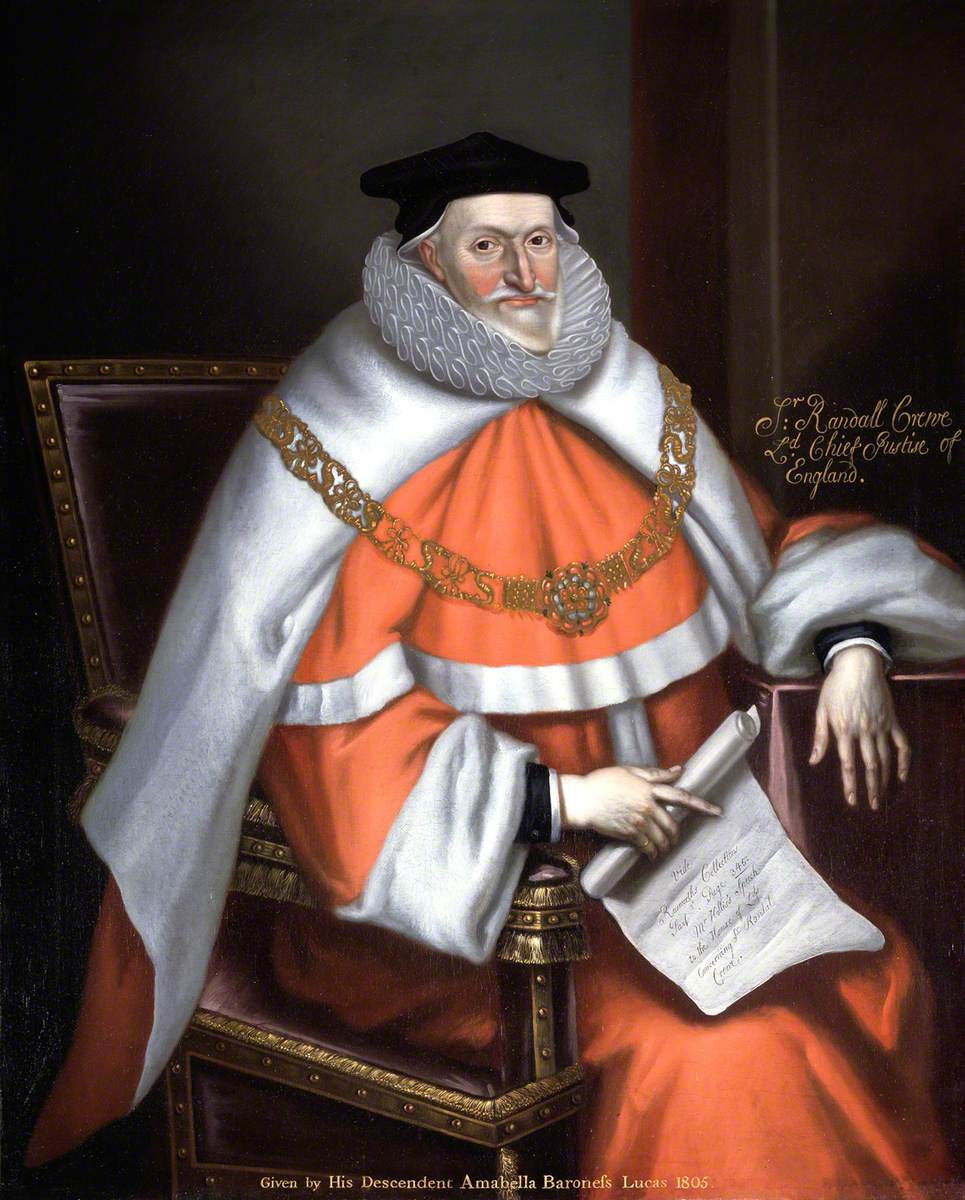
Sir Ranulph Crewe

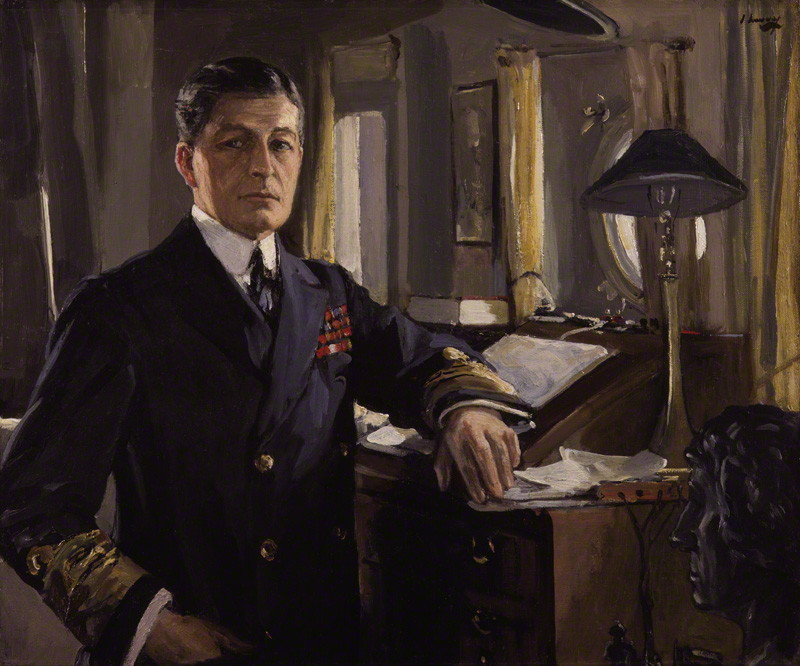
David Beatty, 1st Earl Beatty, 1917

- Sir Nicholas Colfox (flourished 1400, from Nantwich) was a medieval knight involved in the murder of Thomas of Woodstock, 1st Duke of Gloucester, uncle of King Richard II, in 1397.
- Blessed Thomas Holford (1541–1588), a Protestant schoolteacher, then a Catholic priest, was martyred in Clerkenwell and beatified in 1896.
- Sir Roger Wilbraham (1553 in Nantwich – 1616), prominent English lawyer and Solicitor-General for Ireland under Elizabeth I.
- Roger Mainwaring (died 1590), Elizabethan judge in Ireland, was born in Nantwich.
- Sir Ranulph Crewe (1559 in Nantwich – 1646), Lord Chief Justice of England and Wales.
- Sir William Brereton, 1st Baronet (1604–1661), author, and landowner; established his headquarters in Nantwich during the English Civil War in 1643.
- Matthew Henry (1662–1714), a British nonconformist minister, died of apoplexy in Nantwich.
- Hanmer Warrington (c. 1776 in Acton – 1847), British Army officer, became Consul General on the Barbary Coast for 32 years.
- John Eddowes Bowman the Elder (1785–1841), banker and naturalist.
- George Latham (c. 1800 in Nantwich – 1871), architect and surveyor.
- Eddowes Bowman (1810 in Nantwich – 1869), dissenting tutor
- Thomas Egerton Hale (1832 in Nantwich – 1909), an assistant surgeon, awarded the Victoria Cross
- Thomas Bower (1838–1919), English architect and surveyor, was based in Nantwich
- William Pickersgill (1861 in Nantwich – 1928) chief mechanical engineer of the Caledonian Railway to 1923
- David Beatty, 1st Earl Beatty (1871 in Stapeley – 1936), Admiral of the Fleet
- Sir Andrew Witty (born 1964 in Nantwich), CEO of GlaxoSmithKline, went to Malbank School in Nantwich.

=== Politics ===
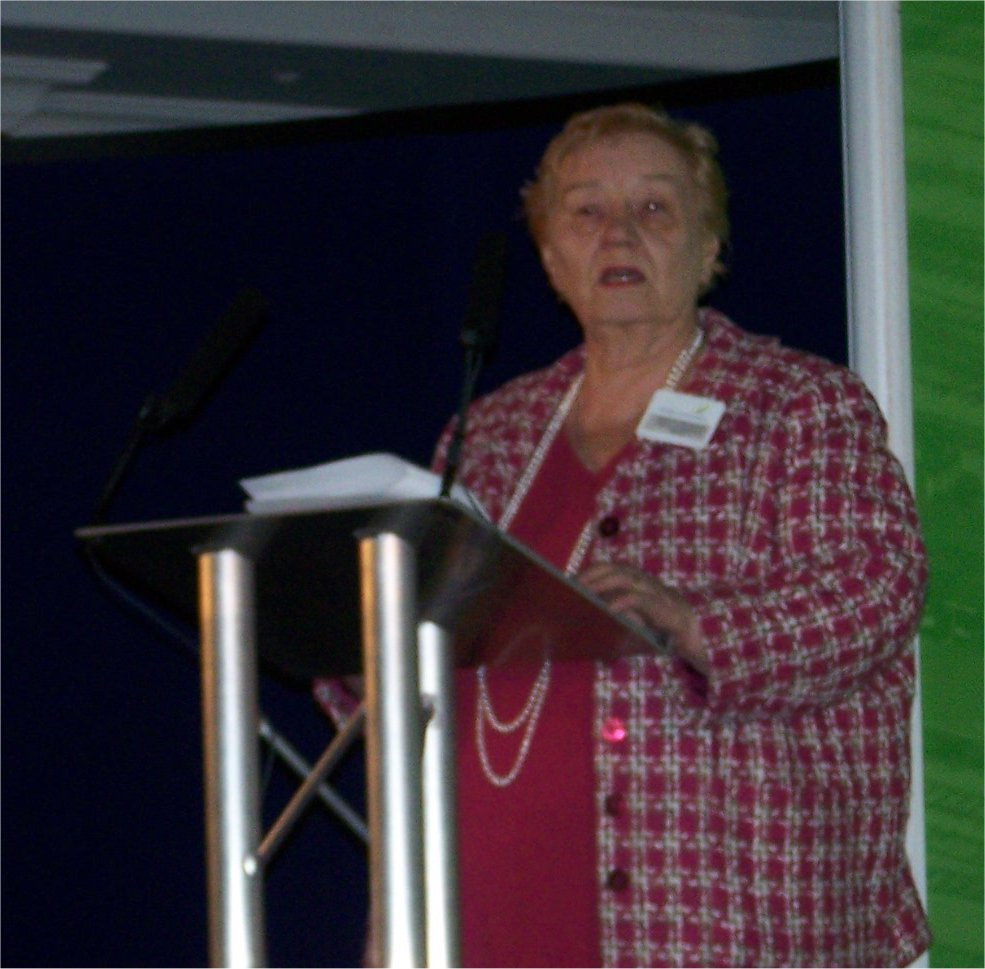
Gwyneth Dunwoody, 2008

- Roger Wilbraham (1743 in Nantwich – 1829), MP, antiquary, historian, published work on Cheshire dialects.
- Clara Gilbert Cole (1868 in Nantwich – 1956), suffragist, socialist, pacifist, anarchist, poet, and pamphleteer.
- Robert Grant-Ferris, Baron Harvington (1907–1997), Deputy Speaker of the House of Commons 1970–1974, was MP for Nantwich, became Baron Harvington, of Nantwich.
- Michael Winstanley, Baron Winstanley (1918–1993), Liberal MP for Cheadle 1966 to 1970 and for Hazel Grove in 1974
- Gwyneth Dunwoody (1930–2008), British Labour Party politician from 1974 to her death in 2008 MP for Exeter 1966–70, and then for Crewe (later Crewe and Nantwich)
- Mike Wood (born 1946), Labour MP for Batley and Spen 1997 to 2015, went to school in Nantwich.
- John Dwyer (born c. 1950), police officer, borough councillor, Assistant Chief Constable and then elected as Cheshire Police and Crime Commissioner
- Laura Smith (born 1985) is a politician and a councillor for Crewe South since 2020. She was a Labour Party Member of Parliament for Crewe and Nantwich in 2017–2019.

=== Science ===
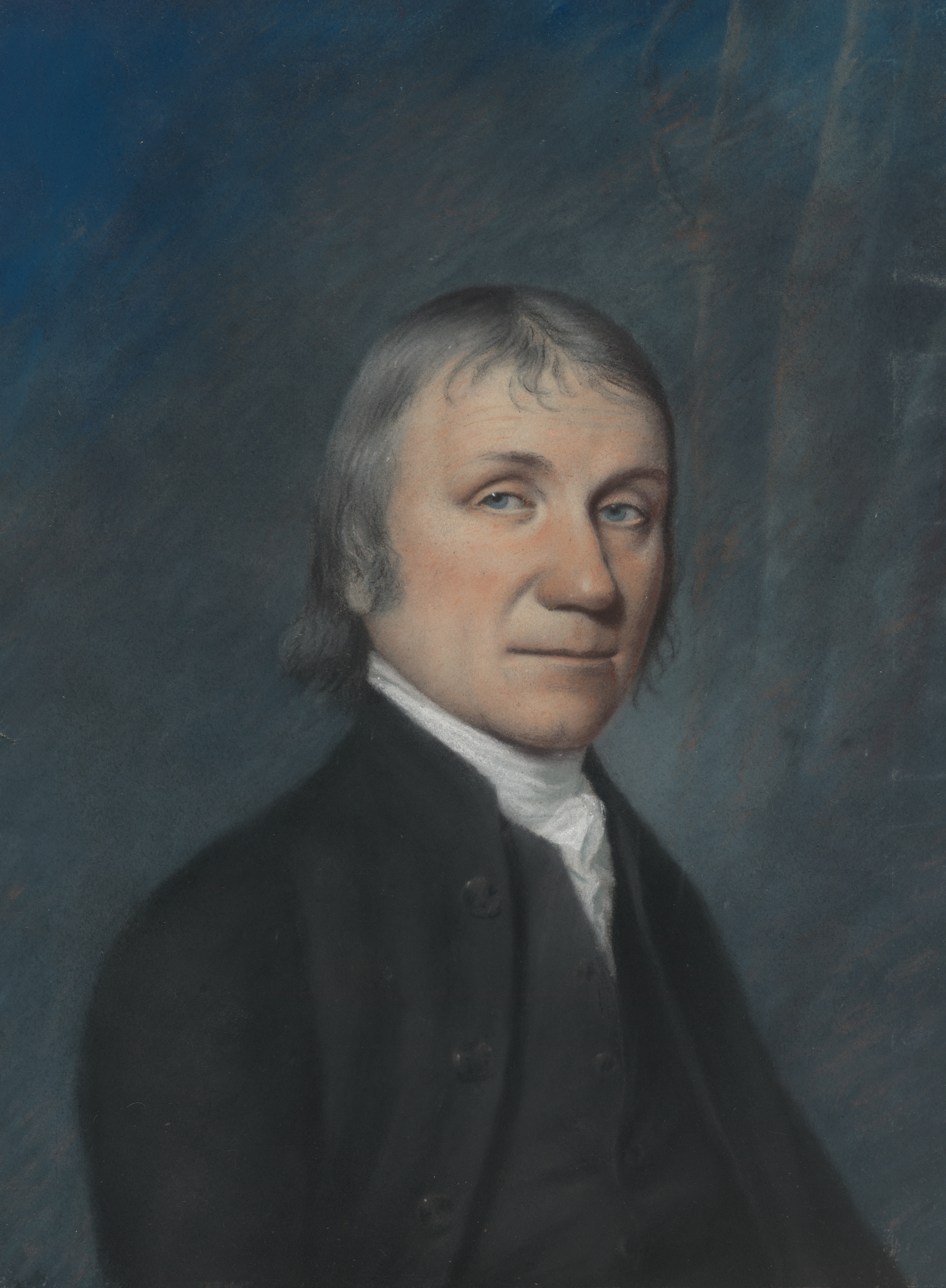
Joseph Priestley, 1797

- John Gerard (1545 in Nantwich – 1612), botanist and author of Herball, or Generall Historie of Plantes (1597)
- Joseph Priestley (1733–1804), co-discoverer of oxygen, Nonconformist minister, lived in Nantwich, 1758–1761.
- Sir William Bowman (1816 in Nantwich – 1892), surgeon, histologist, anatomist and ophthalmologist
- Albert Thomas Price (1903 in Nantwich – 1978), geophysicist, developed mathematical models on global electromagnetic induction.
- Sir Kenneth Mather (1911 in Nantwich – 1990) British geneticist and botanist
- Professor Stephen Eichhorn (born 1974 in Nantwich) British materials scientist, brought up locally

=== Arts ===
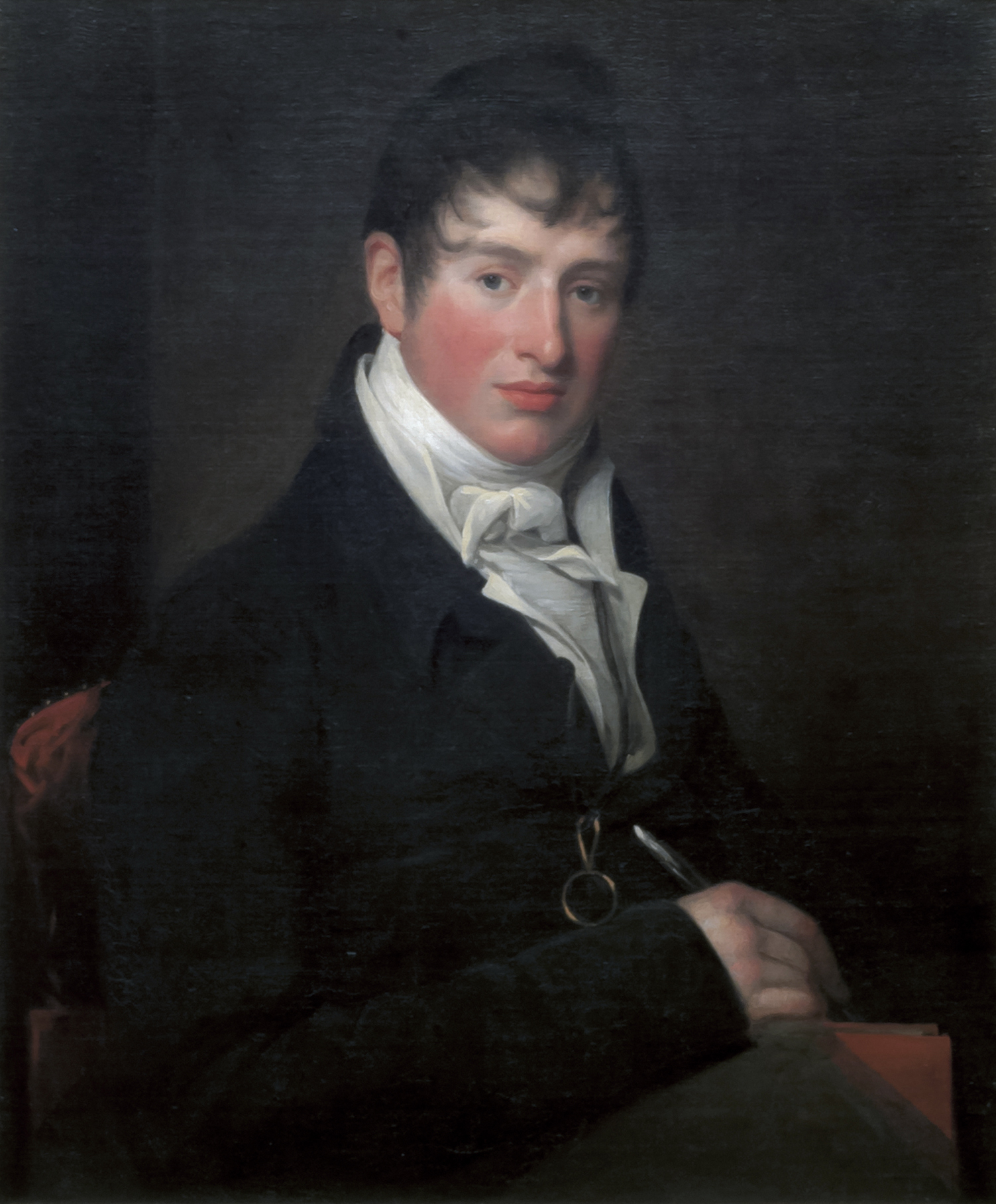
Peter Bayley, c.1810

- Isabella Whitney (born 1545 in Coole Pilate – 1577), said to be the first female poet and professional writer in England.
- Geoffrey Whitney (c. 1548 in Acton – c. 1601), poet, wrote Choice of Emblemes
- Briget Paget (1570 in Nantwich – c.1647), Puritan, her husband John Paget's literary executor and editor.
- Joseph Partridge (1724–1796), waggoner, antiquary and historian, wrote the town's first history in 1774.
- Peter Bayley (1779 in Nantwich – 1823), writer and poet
- James Hall (1846–1914), lived in the town for 40 years and wrote its history.
- Ida Shepley (1908–1975), a British actress and singer.
- Kim Woodburn (1942–2025), television personality, writer and former cleaner, lived in Nantwich.
- Penny Jordan (1946–2011), writer of over 200 romance novels, died locally
- Mārtiņš Rītiņš (1949 in Nantwich – 2022), Latvian chef, restaurateur, culinary TV presenter and author.
- Ben Miller (born 1966), actor, director and comedian, grew up in Nantwich.
- Thea Gilmore (born 1979), singer/songwriter, lives in Nantwich
- AJ Pritchard (born 1994), ballroom and Latin dancer, featured on the BBC TV Strictly Come Dancing, went to school in Nantwich.
- Blitz Kids (active 2006–2015) were an English alternative rock band originating in Nantwich and Crewe.

=== Sport ===
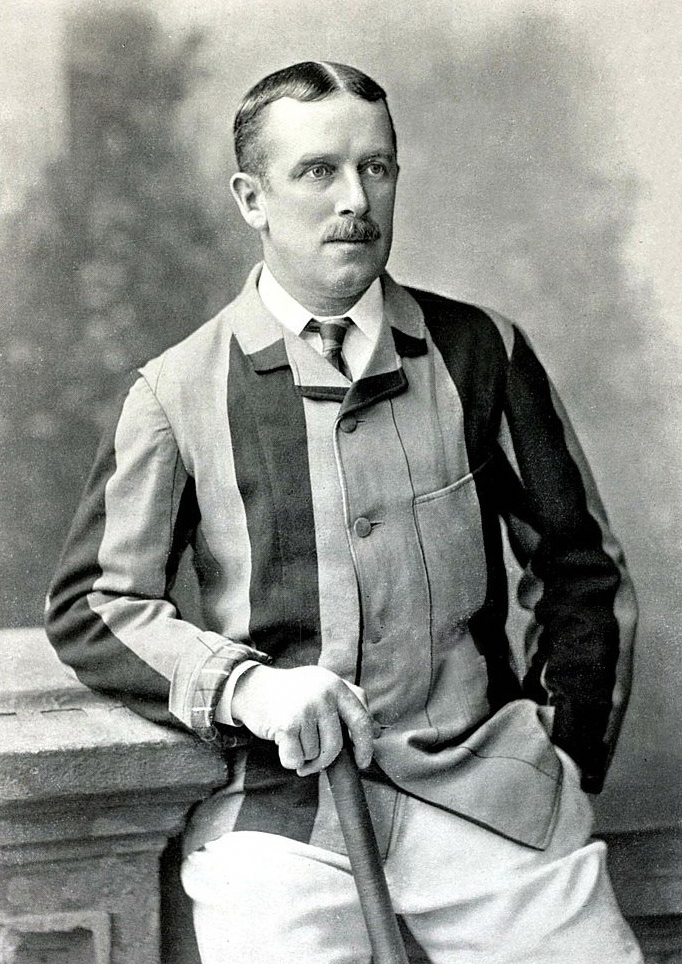
A. N. Hornby

- William Downes (1843 in Nantwich – 1896), a New Zealand cricketer
- A. N. Hornby (1847–1925), the first to captain England in both cricket and rugby; buried in Acton churchyard
- George Davenport (1860–1902), cricketer
- Harry Stafford (1869–1940), footballer, played 273 games, became a hotelier in Canada.
- Ernest Piggott (1878–1967), jump racing jockey.
- William Anderson (1901–1983), ice hockey player, team bronze medallist at the 1924 Winter Olympics
- Alf Lythgoe (1907 in Nantwich – 1967), footballer, played 191 games for Stockport County and Huddersfield Town before becoming manager of non-League Altrincham.
- Dario Gradi, (born 1941), manager of Crewe Alexandra (1983–2007 and 2009–2011), lives in Willaston.
- Steve Waddington (born 1956), former footballer, played 286 games, mainly for Walsall F.C.; son of former Stoke City manager, Tony Waddington
- Ashley Westwood (born 1990 in Nantwich), footballer played over 420 games in UK with Crewe, Aston Villa and Burnley

=== Business ===
- Sir Andrew Witty, (born 1964), CEO of GlaxoSmithKline from 2008 and CEO of UnitedHealth Group from 2021 to 2025

== See also ==
- Listed buildings in Nantwich
- List of places in Cheshire
