= Nantwich Town Council =

UK local authority for the town of Nantwich, Cheshire, England

- Logo

Type
- Type: Town Council

History
- Founded: 1974
- Preceded by: Nantwich Urban District Council

Leadership
- Town Mayor: Cllr Stephanie Wedgwood
- Deputy Mayor: Cllr Stuart Bostock
- Town Clerk: Samantha Roberts

Structure
- Seats: 15 councillors
- Labour: 8 / 15
- Independent: 6 / 15
- Conservative: 1 / 15

Elections
- Last election: 4 May 2023
- Next election: 6 May 2027

Website
- www.nantwichtowncouncil.gov.uk

Nantwich Town Council is the town council for the Cheshire market town of Nantwich. It was established in 1974 as a successor council to the Nantwich Urban District Council. The last elections were held in May 2023, where the Labour Party had significant gains, winning 7 of the 15 seats. The ward boundaries were altered for the 2023 elections - with the town being split into three wards: Nantwich North, South and West, each electing five councillors via plurality block voting. It primarily raises funds through a precept on Council Tax and has the highest Band D in Cheshire East.

== Powers and functions ==
The Town Council derives the bulk of its powers from the Local Government Act 1972 and subsequent legislation. The Town Council operates four Allotment sites, public toilets, Civic Hall, Tourist Information Centre and the Market Hall.
