= Grimsbury =

Area of Banbury, Oxfordshire, England

Coordinates: 52.065°N 1.322°W

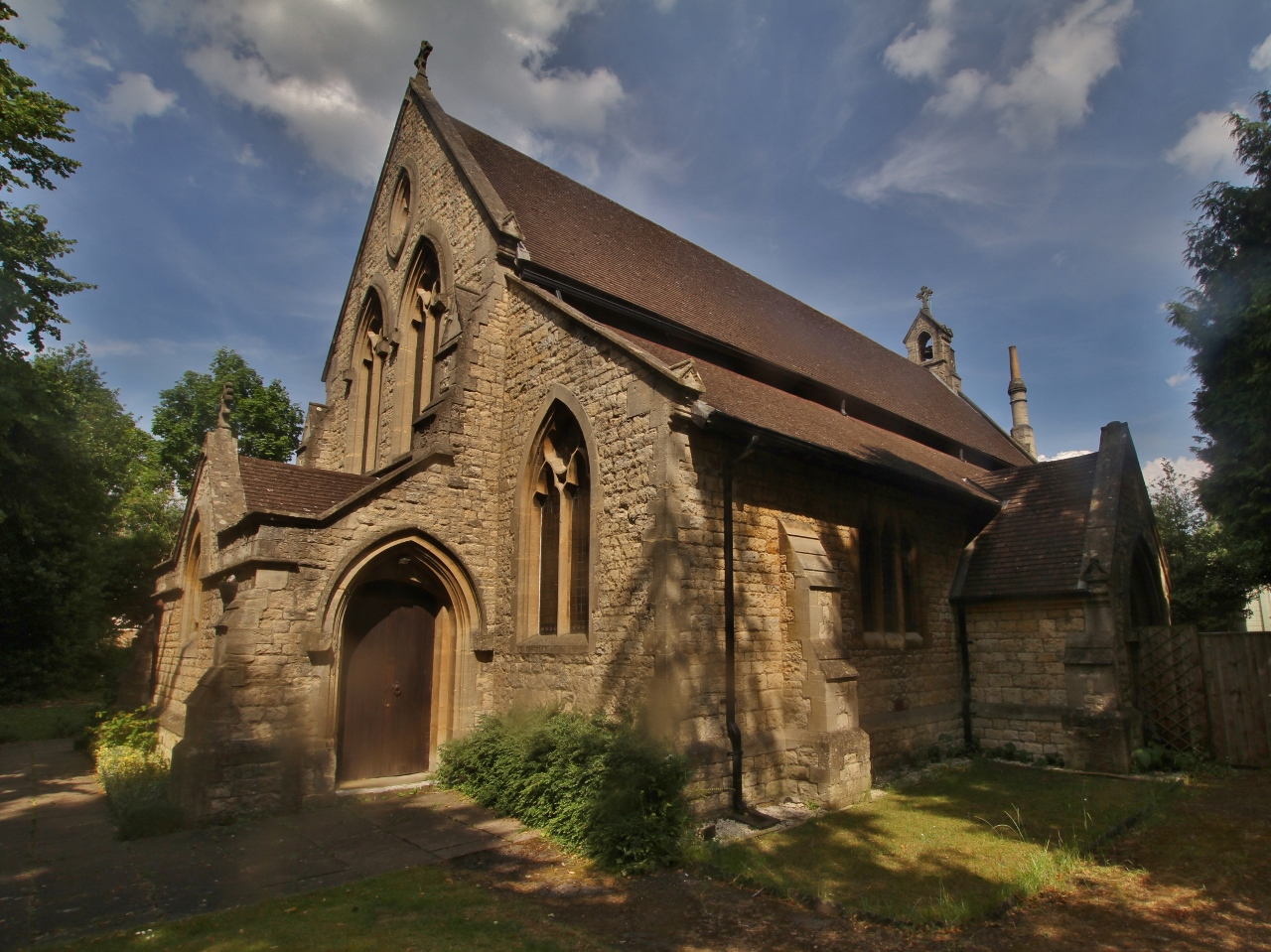
- St Leonard's church, Grimsbury

- Location within Oxfordshire
- OS grid reference: SP4641
- Civil parish: Banbury
- District: Cherwell
- Shire county: Oxfordshire
- Region: South East
- Country: England
- Sovereign state: United Kingdom
- Post town: Banbury
- Postcode district: OX16
- Dialling code: 01295
- Police: Thames Valley
- Fire: Oxfordshire
- Ambulance: South Central
- UK Parliament: Banbury

Grimsbury is a largely residential area which forms the eastern part of Banbury, in the Cherwell district, in the county of, Oxfordshire, England. It is situated east of the River Cherwell, the Oxford Canal and the Cherwell Valley Line railway.

Grimsbury includes Banbury railway station, Banbury United F.C.'s ground, and the town's Royal Mail sorting offices, which were built on the site of the former Banbury Merton Street railway station.

== History ==
Grimsbury was first settled in the 6th century as a Saxon hamlet. The placename appears to be a corruption of the Saxon name for a defended enclosure (burh) of a person called Grim, although it may be noted that old maps of the area record the name as 'Grimsby', a form still used by older inhabitants of the locality. 'Grim' and 'by' are both Danish elements, and it may be significant that the hamlet is situated on the Northamptonshire side of the ancient river crossing which would have been used by the armies of Danes from Northampton mentioned in the Anglo-Saxon Chronicle. It is possible that the name was derived from a pseudonym for the pagan god Woden.

Local living conditions were improved during the Victorian era with the removal of several poorly built cottages that were deemed to be only "hovels" and an end to the endemic "dwarfism" and rickets that had plagued the local children in the early 19th century. A slightly later development still further east in Grimsbury was of larger houses. A lot of cottages on what was called 'Waterloo' (today's Waterloo Road), which apparently lay just east of Banbury Bridge to the north of the road, had transformed from the early 19th century so that by 1841 Waterloo was considered one of the better off parts of Grimsbury. Due to Banbury's then boom time Grimsbury's principal expansion occurred between 1852 and 1881, when some 500 houses were built, around Middleton Road, Causeway, Merton Street, Duke Street, and North Street.

When meadows and the recently disused race-course at Grimsbury were sold to the Great Western Railway circa 1850, the owner also sold the other part of his land, north of the Middleton Road to the Banbury Freehold Land Society, which was financially backed by Cobb's Bank, to build middle-class houses, but development was slow at the time and some plots were never built upon. The land in question and the location of today's Spice Ball Park are marked as "Liable to flooding" on the 1882, 1900, 1910 and 1922 Ordnance Survey maps.

Duke Street, was located at the western edge of Wilkins' (now demolished) brick pit, was developed around 1870. There was a substantial 'brick, tile and drain works' with a short tramway in it to the east of Grimsbury in the vicinity of Howard Street according to the 1882, 1883 1900, 1910, 1922 1923 and 1947 Ordnance Survey maps. It had closed by 1923 and the last workshops had shut in 1955. It was mostly built on by 1965 according to the 1955 and 1965 O.S. maps.

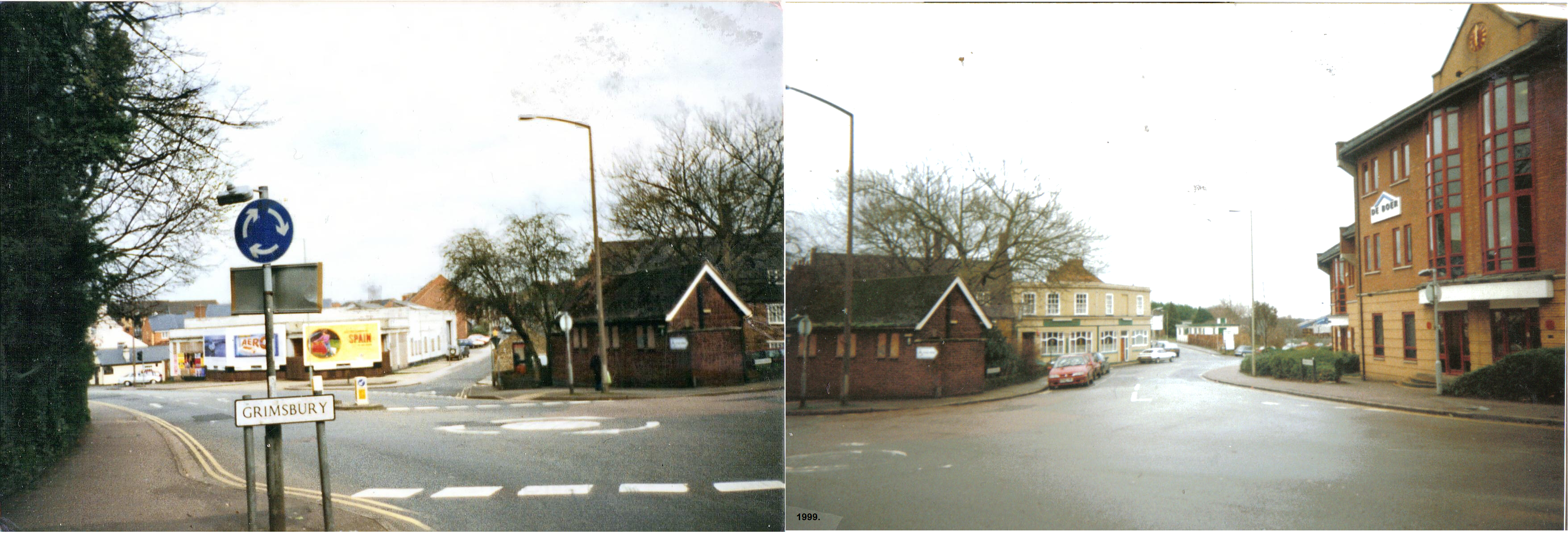
Grimsbury in 1999 (right) and 2000 (left) prior to redevelopment from 2004 to 2008. The Irish pub was reduced in size and renovated, a house was built on part of the old pub, the public toilet was removed in favour of a green space (a small park) and the garage became a Londis shop. The demolitions were in 2004, the refurbishment and building work was in 2007 and the Londis shop opened in 2008.

The Banbury Town Council built the houses in King's Road and on the Easington estate. Other working-class type houses were built at the south end of Britannia Road and the area to the east between 1881 and 1930, as well as in both Old Grimsbury Road and Gibbs Road. More up-market houses were built in both the Marlborough Road area and in Bath Road, Kings Road, Park Road, and Queen Street in Neithrop. The mostly late 19th-century suburb of Grimsbury witnessed rapid growth between 1881 and 1930. About 300 more houses were built after 1945, in the areas of Grimsbury Square, Fergusson Road, Howard Street, School View, and Edward Street. To the north of Grimsbury Square is the 1945–55 area of "New Grimsbury" and south of it is the 1930 and earlier old town of "Old Grimsbury".

A retail and residential development was built on the former site of the Bridge Motors Vauxhall dealership and opened in 2010. The region has in recent decades been home to many Asian families and has recently been settled by many East European immigrants. Grimsbury is on a floodplain and suffered severe floods in 1998 and 2007.

=== Recent events ===
Workmen found a fizzing and burning incendiary chemical that was suspected to be left over from a long-demolished World War I munitions factory and ammunition testing range. Thames Valley Police closed the Tesco Express, The Pepper Pot pub and the Atlantis Fish bar and set up a 100 m (330 ft) cordon on 19 April 2012. Three World War I phosphorus grenades on 20 April and an unreleased number of anti-tank grenades were destroyed on 24 April. The area around the Tesco Express Middleton Road, Grimsbury, witnessed the disposal of several lost pieces of World War I ordnance that remained buried after the closure of the local ammunition testing range. They were reckoned to be part of a batch of 20 that were lost in 1919. On 26 April some World War II smoke bombs were also disposed of. Fire station manager Mick Clarke said fire crews and the Royal Logistics Corps were disposing of them.

=== Administrative history ===
Grimsbury and the neighbouring hamlet of Nethercote formed part of the ancient parish of Banbury. The parish historically straddled the boundary between Oxfordshire and Northamptonshire, which followed the River Cherwell; most of the parish was west of the river in Oxfordshire, but Grimsbury and Nethercote were in Northamptonshire, being east of the river. For the purposes of administering the poor laws from the 17th century onwards, the Northamptonshire part of Banbury parish, including Grimsbury, was jointly administered with the neighbouring parish of Warkworth. In 1866 the legal definition of 'parish' was changed to be the areas used for administering the poor laws, and so Grimsbury was thereafter part of the civil parish of Warkworth, whilst remaining part of the ecclesiastical parish of Banbury.

Grimsbury was included in the parliamentary borough (constituency) of Banbury from 1832. Grimsbury was also included in the Banbury local board district from the district's creation in 1852, with the local board being responsible for various local government functions including sewers and public health. The Northamptonshire parts of the Banbury local board district, including Grimsbury, were transferred from Northamptonshire to Oxfordshire in 1889. Later that year, the municipal borough of Banbury was enlarged to cover the whole of the local board district, and the local board's functions were transferred to the borough council.

The 1889 reforms did not affect civil parish boundaries, and so after 1889 Warkworth parish straddled Northamptonshire and the borough of Banbury in Oxfordshire. The Local Government Act 1894 directed that parishes could no longer straddle borough or county boundaries, and so a new civil parish of Grimsbury was created in 1894 from the part of Warkworth parish within the borough. Grimsbury was then one of three civil parishes within the borough of Banbury; as an urban parish it was directly administered by the borough council rather than having its own parish council. The civil parish of Grimsbury was abolished in 1932 when the three parishes within the borough were united into a single parish of Banbury covering the same area as the borough. In 1931 (the last census before its abolition) the civil parish of Grimsbury had a population of 3,501.

== New Grimsbury ==
The post-1945 housing estate is situated at the northern end of the first (old) Grimsbury estate. About 300 more houses were built after 1945, in the areas of Grimsbury Square, Fergusson Road, Howard Street, School View, and Edward Street. To the north of Grimsbury Square is the 1945–55 area referred to as New Grimsbury. South of it is the old town of "Old Grimsbury" built prior to 1930. It was expanded in both the late 1950s and early 1960s with a mixture of working-class and middle-class homes. Further minor expansions were also taking place towards the north of the estate in 2008–2011.

== Axis and Market Quarter housing estates ==
Grimsbury was expanded further as the Market Quarter housing development has begun on the former cattle market site, along with the new Axis housing estate just to the east, which has added over 300 new homes and a primary school to replace Dashwood School.

== Former cattle market ==
Grimsbury was once home to Western Europe's largest cattle market, on Merton Street. The market was a key feature of Victorian life, both in the town and countryside. In the late 1920s the economy of Banbury was revolutionised by the arrival of new industries and in particular by the relocation of the out of town livestock market to Grimsbury. It used to be held in Neithrop and/or Bridge Street, Banbury. The new site was selected due to its proximity to the railway station. It was formally closed in June 1998, after being abandoned several years earlier, and was replaced with a new housing development and Dashwood Banbury Academy, a primary school.

== Churches ==
Grimsbury Wesleyan Chapel in West Street was a neoclassical brick and stone building completed in 1871. The present Methodist church in West Street is modern. The Church of England parish church of Saint Leonard was designed by the local architect Walter Mills and built in 1890. It is a Gothic Revival building with north and south aisles joined to the nave by four-bay arcades. St Leonard's was a chapel of ease to Christ Church in Broad Street until 1921, when Grimsbury was constituted as a separate parish with Saint Leonard's as its church. In 1931 a fire destroyed much of the south side of St Leonard's and thereafter the church was redecorated and a new vestry built.

In 1978 a new Church of England Parish of Banbury, comprising four districts, was inaugurated. In 1998 the Banbury Team Ministry was dissolved and St. Leonard's reinstated as a separate parish. In 2001 a new dais was built in the nave of St Leonard's and the High Altar was placed in the centre. The font was also moved from the south aisle and placed in the nave at the west end of the church. In 2003 the church was redecorated with the central pillars being painted to reflect the decoration of the ceiling designed in the style of a canal narrowboat.

== Schools ==
There are two primary schools in Grimsbury. Dashwood Banbury Academy moved from Dashwood Road on the other side of the river to brand-new buildings in Merton Street in 2008. The school is part of a Federation with the town's main secondary school, Wykham Park Academy, formerly Banbury School. It has 200 pupils. It is unusual for an Oxfordshire primary school in having a school uniform which was introduced in 2009. The headteacher is Vicki McLean. St Leonard's Church of England Primary School was originally Christchurch School. Its original buildings were designed by the Oxford Diocesan architect G.E. Street and built in 1860–61.

== Recreational areas and parks ==
The town centre's Bankside park is near the railway bridge, on the opposite canal to Grimsbury. The Howard Road play area is in Grimsbury. The Verney Road play area, Chaldons Road play area and urban park and Alma Road village green are all in the Market Quarter estate. There is also one other park and one minor playground on the seat.

The nearby hamlet of Nethercote, Banbury is within walking distance, where, as well as Banbury Lane itself, there are numerous public footpaths running through Nethercote, Banbury.

== Transport ==
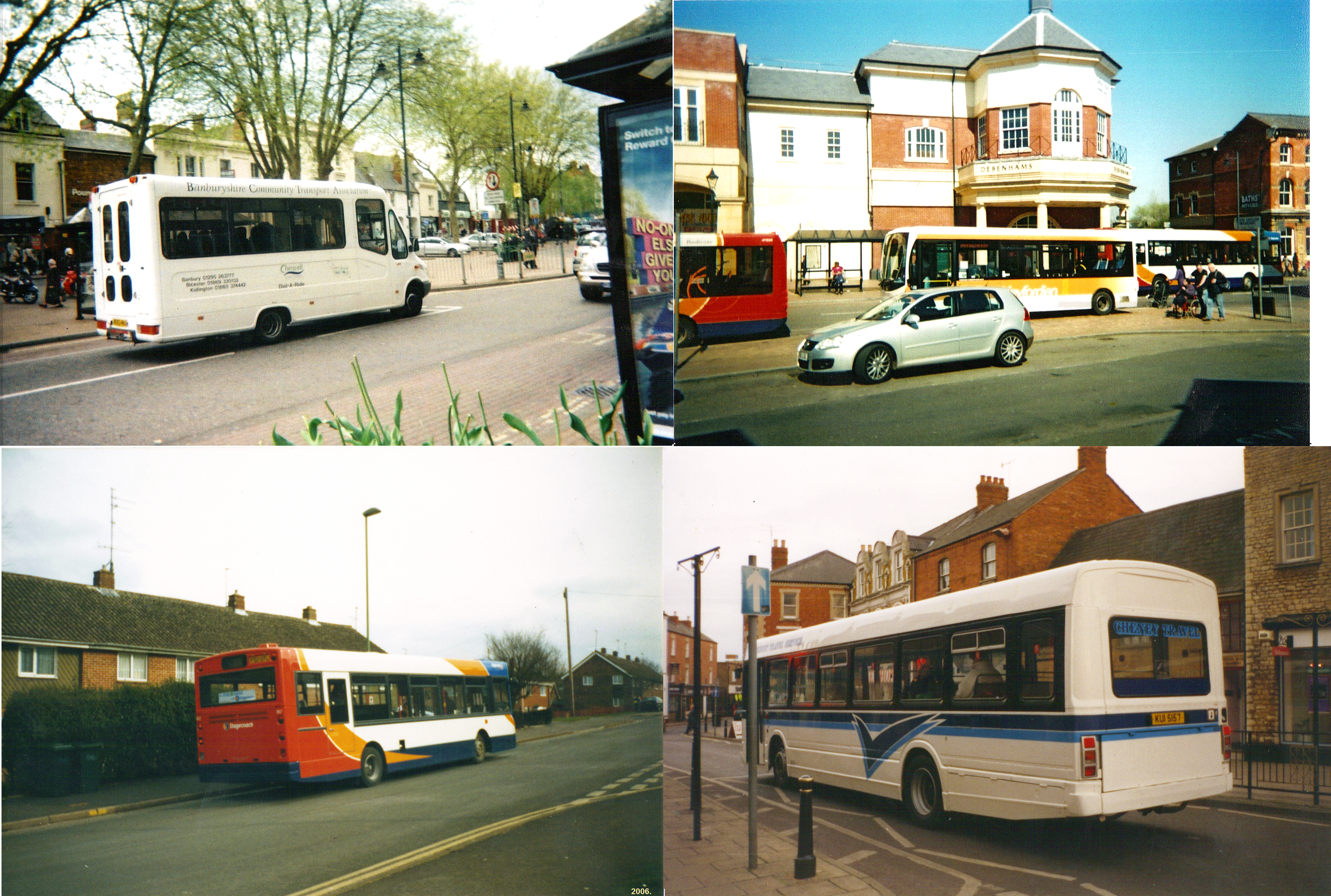
A former Cheney Coaches bus, a Heyfordian bus, a Stagecoach bus and a Banburyshire Community Transport Association (B.C.T.A) bus in Banbury. Stagecoach buses ran every 15 minutes on weekdays and every 20 minutes at weekends as of 2008 and the Heyfordian bus runs every 30 minutes, except on Sundays as of 2009.

Stagecoach Oxfordshire run a majority of services in the area, which are:

- Service B9 between Banbury Town Centre, Banbury Gateway Shopping Park and Hardwick
- Service 200 between Banbury Town Centre and Daventry via Woodford Halse
- Service 500 between Banbury Town Centre and Brackley via Middleton Cheney (every other bus serves Chacombe)
- Service 505 between Banbury Town Centre and Bicester (once a day)
- Redline Buses run service 132 twice a week on a Saturday between Buckingham and Banbury.
- Kidlington Assisted Transport operate the B7A service, which is a Grimsbury circular service.

== See also ==
- History of Banbury, Oxfordshire
- Warkworth, Northamptonshire
- Nethercote, Banbury

== Sources and further reading ==
- A History of the County of Oxford. Dawsons of Pall Mall. 1957. pp. 18–28. ISBN 978-0-7129-0456-8.
- Sherwood, Jennifer; Pevsner, Nikolaus (1974). Oxfordshire. The Buildings of England. Harmondsworth: Penguin Books. p. 444. ISBN 0-14-071045-0.
