= History of cheese =

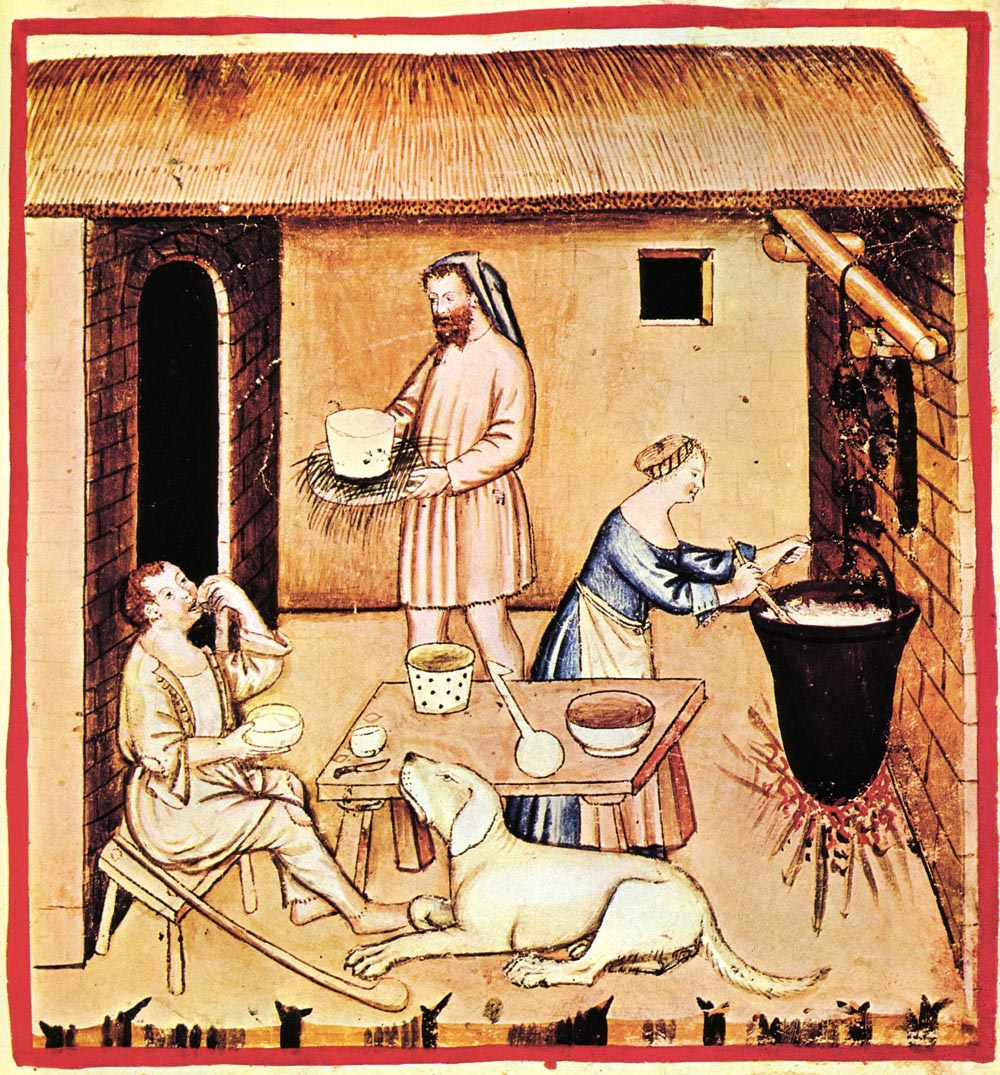
Cheese-making, Tacuinum sanitatis Casanatensis (14th century)

The production of cheese predates recorded history, beginning well over 7,000 years ago. Humans likely developed cheese and other dairy foods by accident, as a result of storing and transporting milk in bladders made of ruminants' stomachs; within the stomach an inherent supply of rennet would encourage curdling, forming cheese. There is no conclusive evidence indicating where cheese-making originated: possibly Europe, or Central Asia, the Middle East, or the Sahara.

== Discovery, origins and myths ==
=== Discovery and process ===
It is unknown when cheese was first made. The earliest direct evidence for cheesemaking has been found in excavated clay sieves (holed pottery) dated to be over seven thousand years old; For example in Kujawy, Poland, and the Dalmatian coast in Croatia, the latter with dried remains which chemical analysis suggests was cheese. Shards of holed pottery were also found in Urnfield pile-dwellings on Lake Neuchatel in Switzerland and are hypothesized to be cheese-strainers; they date back to roughly eight thousand years ago.

For preservation purposes, cheese-making may have begun by the pressing and salting of curdled milk. Animal skins and inflated internal organs already provided storage vessels for a range of foodstuffs. Curdling milk in an animal's stomach made solid and better-textured curds when compared to other traditional storage methods, such as clay jars.

Hard salted cheese is likely to have accompanied dairying from the outset as it is the only form in which milk can be kept in a hot climate. Dairying existed around 4,000 BC in the grasslands of the Sahara. Cheese produced in Europe, where climates are cooler than in the Middle East, required less salt for preservation. With less salt and acidity, the cheese became a suitable environment for useful microbes and molds, giving aged cheeses their pronounced and interesting flavors.

=== Earliest origins ===
The earliest written evidence of cheese is in the Sumerian cuneiform texts of the Third Dynasty of Ur, dated at the early second millennium BC. The earliest cheeses were sour and salty and similar in texture to rustic cottage cheese or present-day feta. In Late Bronze Age Minoan-Mycenaean Crete, Linear B tablets recorded the inventorying of cheese, (Mycenaean Greek in Linear B: 𐀶𐀫, tu-ro; later Greek: τυρός) flocks and shepherds. The oldest preserved remnants of cheese were identified on mummies in Xiaohe Cemetery in present-day Xinjiang.

=== Legends and folklore ===
An Arab legend attributes the discovery of cheese to an Arab trader who used this method of storing milk. However, cheese was already well known among the Sumerians.

== Ancient History: Egypt, Europe and the Mediterranean (3000BCE – 500CE) ==
=== Ancient Egypt ===
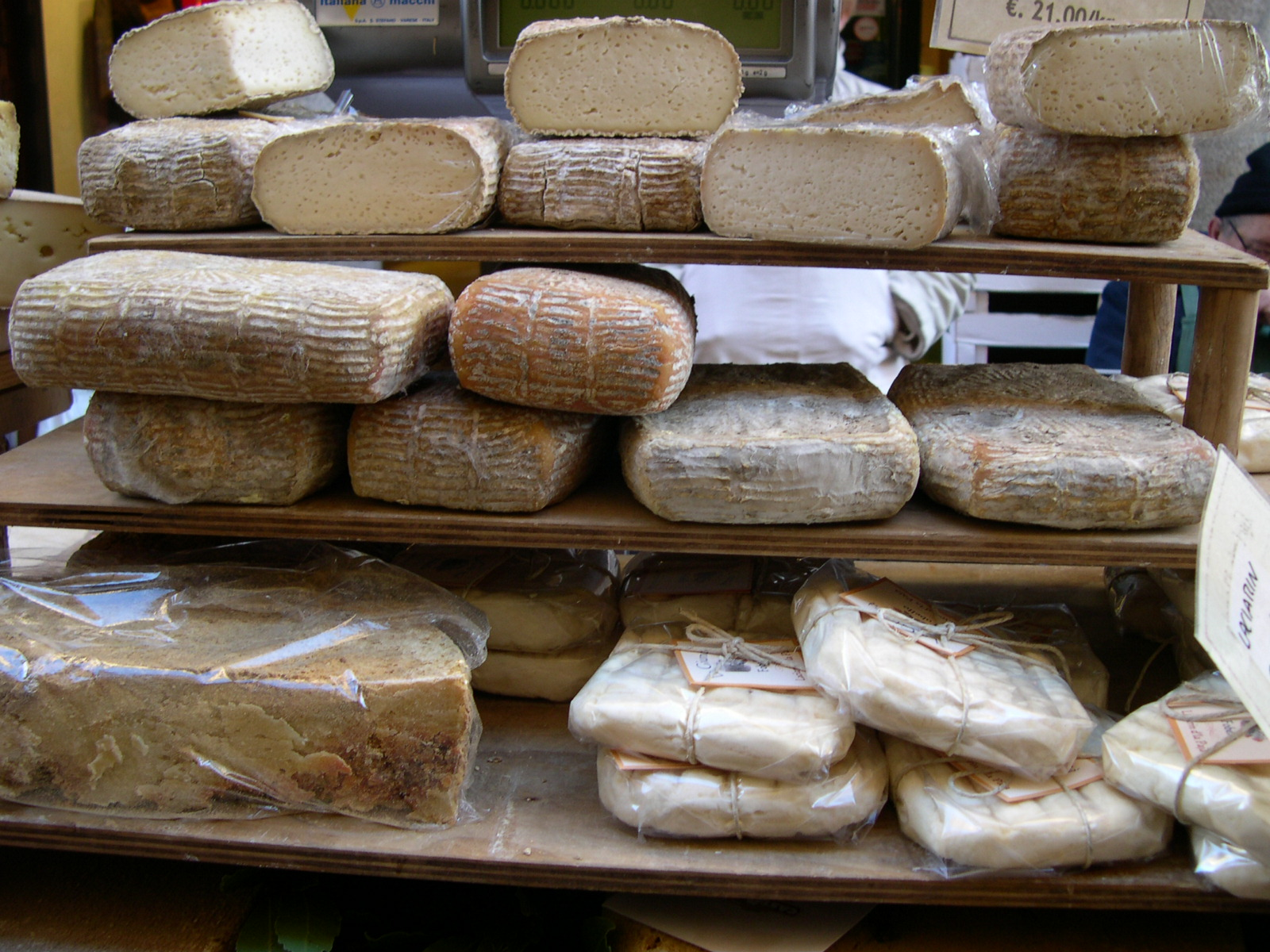
Cheese in a market in Italy

Archaeological evidence for making cheese in Egypt goes back about 5,000 years. In 2018, archeologists from Cairo University and the University of Catania reported the discovery of the oldest known cheese from Egypt. Discovered in the Saqqara necropolis, it is around 3,200 years old. Earlier, remains identified as cheese were found in the funeral meal in an Egyptian tomb dating around 2900 BC. Visual evidence of Egyptian cheesemaking was found in Egyptian tomb murals made in approximately 2000 BC.

=== Ancient Europe ===
Cheese-making was known in Europe at the earliest level of Hellenic myth. (Note: The archaic myth of the culture-hero Aristaeus, who introduced bee-keeping and cheese-making before wine was known in Greece.) According to Pliny the Elder, cheese became a sophisticated enterprise at the start of the ancient Rome era. During the ancient Rome era, valued foreign cheeses were transported to Rome to satisfy the tastes of the social elite.

=== Ancient Mediterranean ===
Ancient Greek mythology credited Aristaeus with the discovery of cheese. Homer's Odyssey (late 8th century BC) describes the Cyclops producing and storing sheep's and goat's milk and cheese:

We soon reached his cave, but he was out shepherding, so we went inside and took stock of all that we could see. His cheese-racks were loaded with cheeses, and he had more lambs and kids than his pens could hold [...] When he had so done he sat down and milked his ewes and goats, all in due course, and then let each of them have her own young. He curdled half the milk and set it aside in wicker strainers.

A letter of Epicurus to his patron requests a wheel of hard cheese so that he may make a feast whenever he wishes. Pliny recorded the Roman tradition that Zoroaster had lived on cheese.

By Roman times, cheese-making was a common practice and food group. Columella's De Re Rustica (c. 65 CE) details a cheese-making process involving rennet coagulation, pressing of the curd, salting, and aging. Pliny's Natural History (77 CE) devotes two chapters (XI, 96–97) to the diversity of cheeses enjoyed by Romans of the early Empire. He stated that the best cheeses came from pagi near Nîmes, were identifiable as Lozère and Gévaudan, and had to be eaten fresh.

== Post-Roman History: Europe, Asia and the Americas (500CE - 1800 CE) ==
=== Europe ===
Most named cheeses known today were initially recorded in the late Middle Ages. The existence of cheddar has been recorded since the 1500s, the production of Parmesan (Parmigiano) began in 1200, Gouda in 1697, and Camembert in 1791. Cheeses diversified in Europe with locales developing their own traditions and products when Romanized populations encountered unfamiliar neighbors with their own cheese-making traditions. As long-distance trade collapsed, only travelers encountered unfamiliar cheeses. Charlemagne's first encounter with an edible rind white cheese forms one of the constructed anecdotes of Notker's Life of the Emperor. Cheese-making in manor and monastery intensified local characteristics imparted by local bacterial flora while the identification of monks with cheese is sustained through modern marketing labels. This also led to a diversity of cheese types.

The advancement of the art of cheesemaking in Europe was slow during the centuries after Rome's fall. It became a staple of long-distance commerce, was disregarded as peasant fare, inappropriate on a noble table, and even harmful to one's health through the Middle Ages.

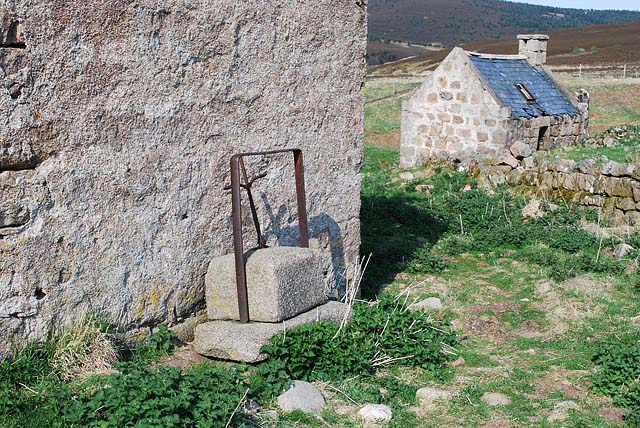
A disused stone cheese-press at the farm Auchabrack, in Aberdeenshire, Scotland

=== Americas ===
There is no archeological evidence for cheese production in the Americas prior to European contact and the importation of domesticated dairy animals.

=== Asia ===
Preserved cheese dating from 1615 BC was found in the Taklamakan Desert in Xinjiang, China.

== Modern history: Mass production and popular consumption (1800CE - Today) ==
=== Spread and evolution of cheeses ===
Until its modern spread along with European culture, cheese was most common by far in Europe, and the Middle East and North Africa. It was unheard of or far less common in sub-Saharan Africa, the rest of Asia, and pre-colonization Americas. Although cheese is still less prominent in local cuisines outside of Europe, the Middle East, and the Americas, most cheeses have become popular worldwide through the spread of European and Euro-American empires and culture.

In Asia, local cheese today is commonly made or available in most of South Asia in the form of paneer and related cheeses. Rubing in Yunnan, China is similar to paneer. Mainstream Chinese culture is not dairy-centric, but some outlying regions of the country including Yunnan have strong cheese traditions. There are a variety of Tibetan cheeses.

Since the European colonization of the Americas, local cheeses have been developed across both North and South America. Mass-produced cheese has become quite common, replacing hand-made and/or local cheeses even more in the United States than in Europe. From the 2010s onwards, more people in the US have been making farmstead (or farmhouse) and artisan cheeses.

Today, Britain has 15 protected cheeses from approximately 40 types listed by the British Cheese Board. The British Cheese Board claims a total number of about 700 different products (including similar cheeses produced by different companies). France has 50 protected cheeses, Italy 52, and Spain 26. Italy has at least 400 cheese varieties as a whole.

=== Mass production ===
The first factory for the industrial production of cheese opened in Switzerland in 1815. However, the large-scale production found real success in the United States. Credit goes to Jesse Williams, a dairy farmer from Rome, New York. Williams began making cheese in an assembly-line fashion using the milk from neighbouring farms in 1851. Within decades, hundreds of dairy associations existed.

Mass-produced rennet began in the 1860s. By the turn of the century, scientists were producing pure microbial cultures. Previously, bacteria in cheese was derived from the environment or from recycling an earlier batch's whey. Pure cultures meant a standardized cheese could be produced. The mass production of cheese made it readily available to the poorer classes. Therefore, simple cost-effective storage solutions for cheese gained popularity. Ceramic cheese dishes, or cheese bells, became one of the most common ways to prolong the life of cheese in the home. It remained popular in most households until the introduction of the home refrigerator in 1913.

Factory-made cheese overtook traditional cheese-making during the World War II era. Since then, factories have been the source of most cheese in America and Europe. In 2004, Americans were reported to have purchased more processed cheese than "real", factory-made cheese.

=== Popular culture and consumption ===
In 1546, The Proverbs of John Heywood claimed "the moon is made of a greene cheese" (Greene referring to being new or unaged). Variations on this sentiment were long repeated and NASA exploited this myth for an April Fools' Day spoof announcement in 2006.

Since the advent of factory-made cheese in the early 19th century, diets of developed nations, such as the United States, have increasingly included cheese products in popular consumption items. Prominence of cheese in popular American dishes, such as hamburgers, as well as government subsidiary programs, such as the Temporary Emergency Food Assistance Program, have played significant roles in popularizing cheeses in the American diet.

== See also ==
- Food history
- List of ancient dishes and foods
- List of cheeses
- List of European cheeses with protected geographical status
- Cheesemaking
