= Listed buildings in Aston juxta Mondrum =

Aston juxta Mondrum is a civil parish in Cheshire East, England. It contains five buildings that are recorded in the National Heritage List for England as designated listed buildings, all of which are at Grade II. This grade is the lowest of the three gradings given to listed buildings and is applied to "buildings of national importance and special interest". The parish is crossed by the Middlewich Branch of the Shropshire Union Canal, and is almost entirely rural. The listed buildings consist of a church, two farmhouses, and two structures associated with the canal, an accommodation bridge and a lock.

Name and location	Photograph	Date	Notes
Brayne Hall; 53.11418°N 2.50399°W	—	15th century	The farmhouse has been altered later. It is built in brick, which is partly stuccoed, it has a tiled roof, and is in two storeys with an attic. The farmhouse has a front of three gabled bays. Inside the building is 15th and 17th-century woodwork, some of which is decorated.
Lower Hall; 53.10389°N 2.53747°W	—	Late 17th century	A brick farmhouse with a tiled roof, it was later altered and extended. It is in two storeys, and has an L-shaped plan with a main front of five bays. The windows are casements. Inside the farmhouse is an inglenook beam.
Jackson's Bridge; 53.12252°N 2.52115°W		1827–32	This accommodation bridge is Bridge No. 7 crossing the Middlewich Branch of the Shropshire Union Canal. It was designed by Thomas Telford, and is built in brick with a stone band and copings. The bridge has a single basket arch, with a solid parapet and piers.
Minshull Lock; 53.12256°N 2.51836°W		c. 1830	The lock is on the Middlewich Branch of the Shropshire Union Canal, and was designed by Thomas Telford. It is built in brick with sandstone quoins, steps, and copings. The upper gate has an oak beam, and the lower gates are in metal.
St Oswald's Church; 53.1072°N 2.5223°W		1872	The church was designed by Charles Lynam. It was badly damaged by a fire in December 1997, and has since been rebuilt. The church is built in polygonal stone with a tiled roof. It has a cruciform plan, with a nave, a south porch, north and south transepts, and a chancel. Over the crossing is a flèche.

== See also ==
- Listed buildings in Cholmondeston
- Listed buildings in Church Minshull
- Listed buildings in Poole
- Listed buildings in Worleston
