= Poole, Cheshire =

Village in Cheshire, England

Coordinates: 53.101°N 2.551°W

Poole
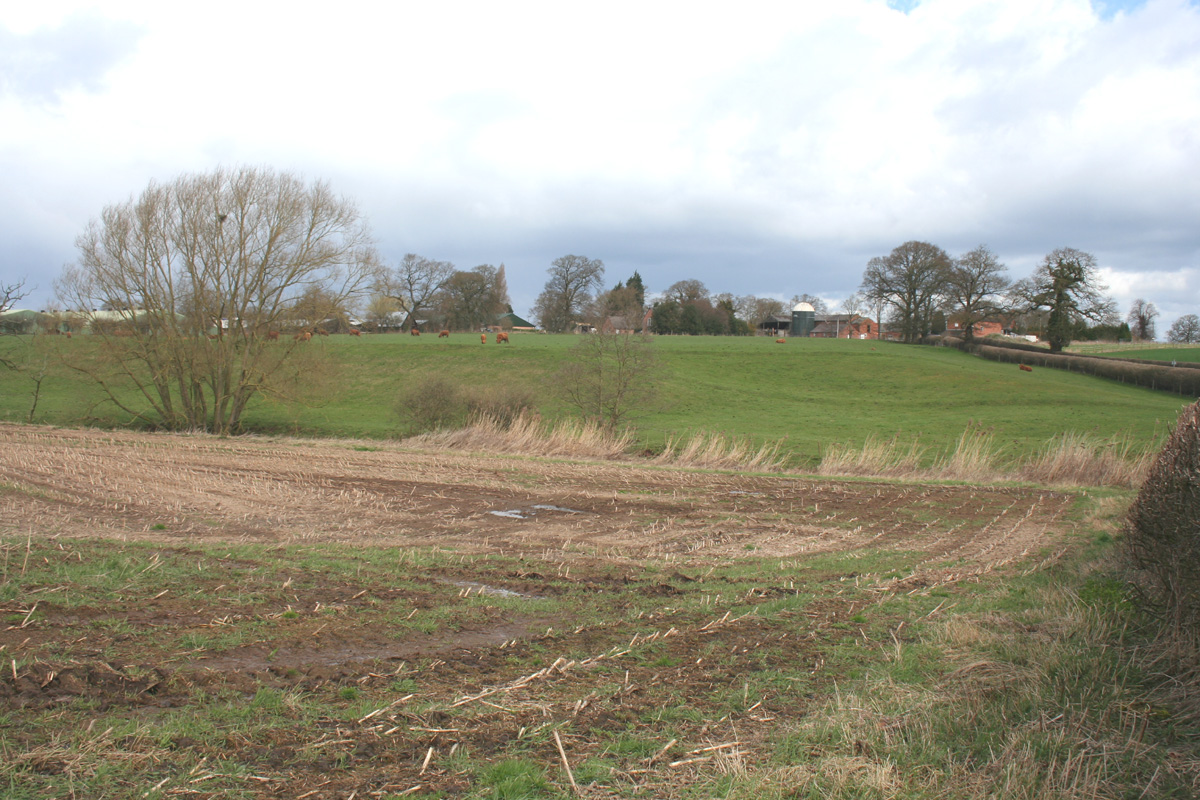
- Farmland near Poole Bank

- Location within Cheshire
- Population: 101
- OS grid reference: SJ6455
- Unitary authority: Cheshire East
- Ceremonial county: Cheshire
- Region: North West
- Country: England
- Sovereign state: United Kingdom
- Post town: NANTWICH
- Postcode district: CW5
- Dialling code: 01270
- UK Parliament: Chester South and Eddisbury

Poole is a civil parish in the unitary authority of Cheshire East and the ceremonial county of Cheshire, England, which lies to the north west of Nantwich and to the west of Crewe. The Shropshire Union Canal runs through the parish. Nearby villages include Acton, Aston juxta Mondrum, Barbridge, Stoke Bank, Rease Heath and Worleston.

The civil parish is largely rural with scattered farms and buildings, and a total population of around 90 in 2006. At the time of the 2011 Census the population of the civil parish remained less than 100. Details are included in the civil parish of Worleston.

== History ==
Poole was a late Saxon village; the name derives from the Saxon Pol, meaning a pool. Two holdings were recorded in the Domesday survey of 1086, with a total population of 9, greater than any of the surrounding manors except Acton. A coppice or small wood was recorded. Before the Norman Conquest, it was held by Wulfeva, described as "a free woman", and afterwards by William Malbank (or Malbedeng), the first Baron of Wich Malbank (Nantwich). At this time, Poole fell within the Forest of Mondrem, the southern half of Delamere Forest. The two manors of White-Poole and Barrets-Poole each maintained an underforester and also paid frithmote tax, which might have entitled them to certain forest privileges or exempted them from the forest courts. By the late medieval period, Poole was divided into three manors, Barrets-Poole (later Barratt-Poole), War-Poole and White-Poole. The area of the modern civil parish fell within the ancient parish of Acton in the Nantwich Hundred; it was served by St Mary's Church, Acton until 1873.

In 1601, Poole had a watermill at Poole Bridge. An inn, Cocapalle Hill, was recorded at Poole Hill in 1662. Later known as The Cock o' Poole Hill, it was still in existence in 1831, but had closed by 1842.

In the 18th century, Methodists were recorded in Poole, as well as in the adjacent parish of Cholmondeston. John Wesley visited four times between 1751 and 1757. On his second visit in 1752, Wesley wrote: "...we reached Poole ... in the evening and found a congregation gathered from many miles around, several of whom had sat up all night for fear of losing the morning sermon." A Wesleyan Methodist Chapel was built in 1834 at a cost of £120, on a piece of land purchased for 5 shillings.

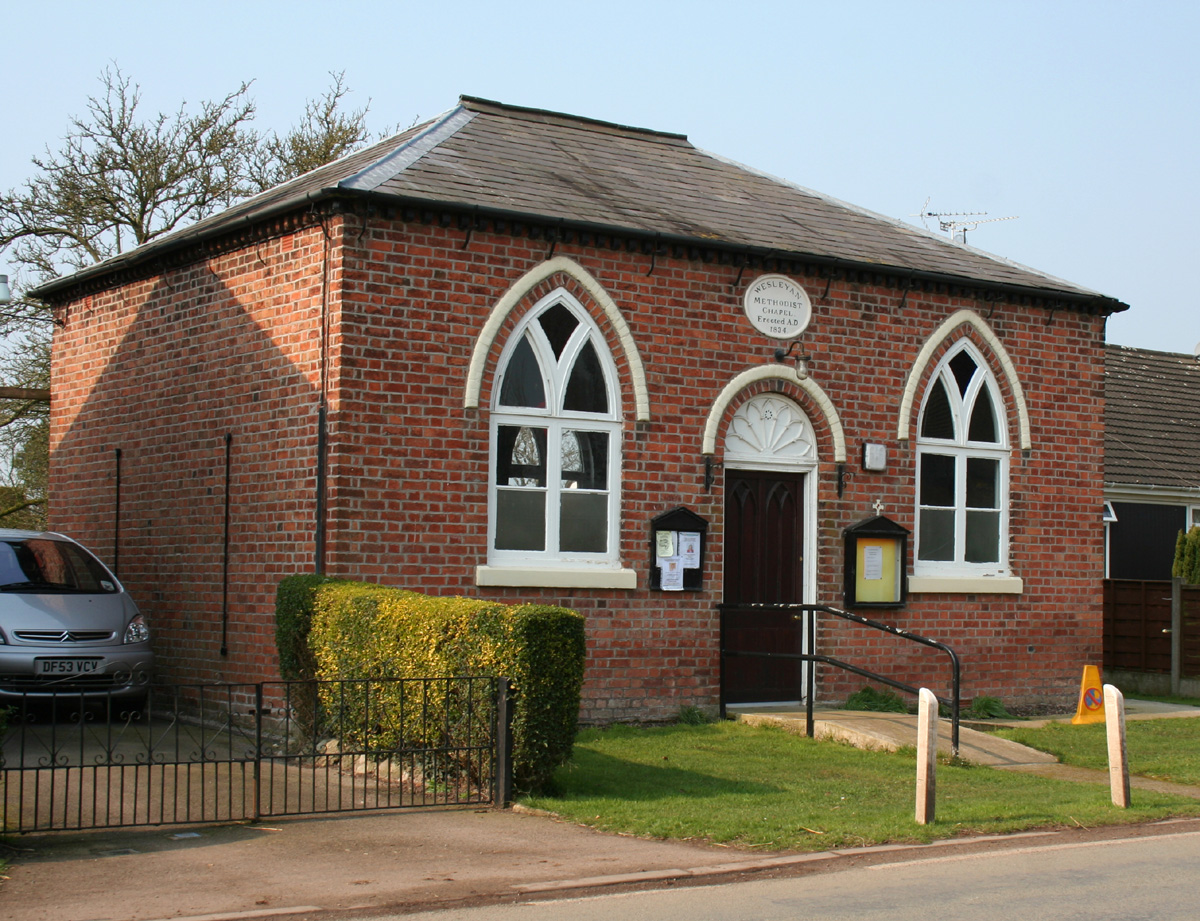
Poole Methodist Chapel

Poole retained its medieval division into three manors into the 19th century. The Elcock or Elcocke family held the manor of White-Poole, which included Poole Farm, from around 1600. Early in the 19th century, White-Poole passed by marriage into the Massey family of Chester, and William Massey built Poole Hall in 1812–7. In 1800, Barratt-Poole was held by the Egertons of Oulton and War-Poole by the Earl of Dysart.

During the Second World War, evacuees from Liverpool and elsewhere were housed at Poole Old Hall.

== Governance ==
Poole is administered by Worleston and District Parish Council, jointly with the adjacent civil parishes of Worleston and Aston juxta Mondrum. From 1974 the civil parish was served by Crewe and Nantwich Borough Council, which was succeeded on 1 April 2009 by the new unitary authority of Cheshire East. Poole falls in the parliamentary constituency of Chester South and Eddisbury, which has been represented since the 2024 general election by Aphra Brandreth of the Conservative Party. It was previously part of the Eddisbury constituency, which since its establishment in 1983 had been held by the Conservative MPs Alastair Goodlad (1983–99), Stephen O'Brien (1999–2015), Antoinette Sandbach (2015–19) and Edward Timpson (2019–24).

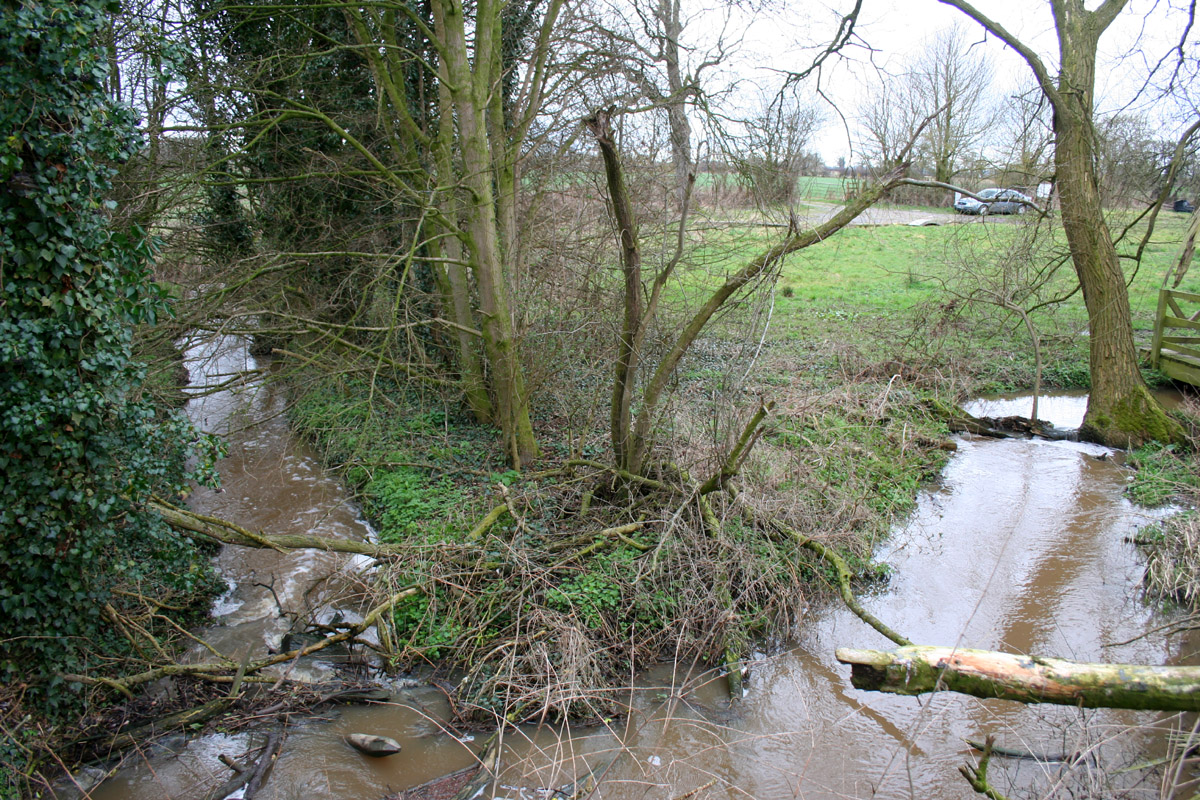
Brook near Poole Old Hall

== Geography, transport and economy ==
The civil parish has a total area of 762 acres (3.08 km^{2}). Much of the terrain is flat, with an average elevation of around 45 metres. A network of unnamed brooks, tributaries of the River Weaver, run across the civil parish, with more undulating terrain occurring in their vicinity; the eastern parish boundary and parts of the north and west boundaries are defined by these brooks. There are also numerous scattered small meres and ponds. There are several small areas of woodland, including part of Poole Gorse. In the north east of the parish, near Poole Old Hall, is an area designated as access land. A short stretch of the Shropshire Union Canal, just south of Hurleston Junction, runs north–south near the western edge of the parish.

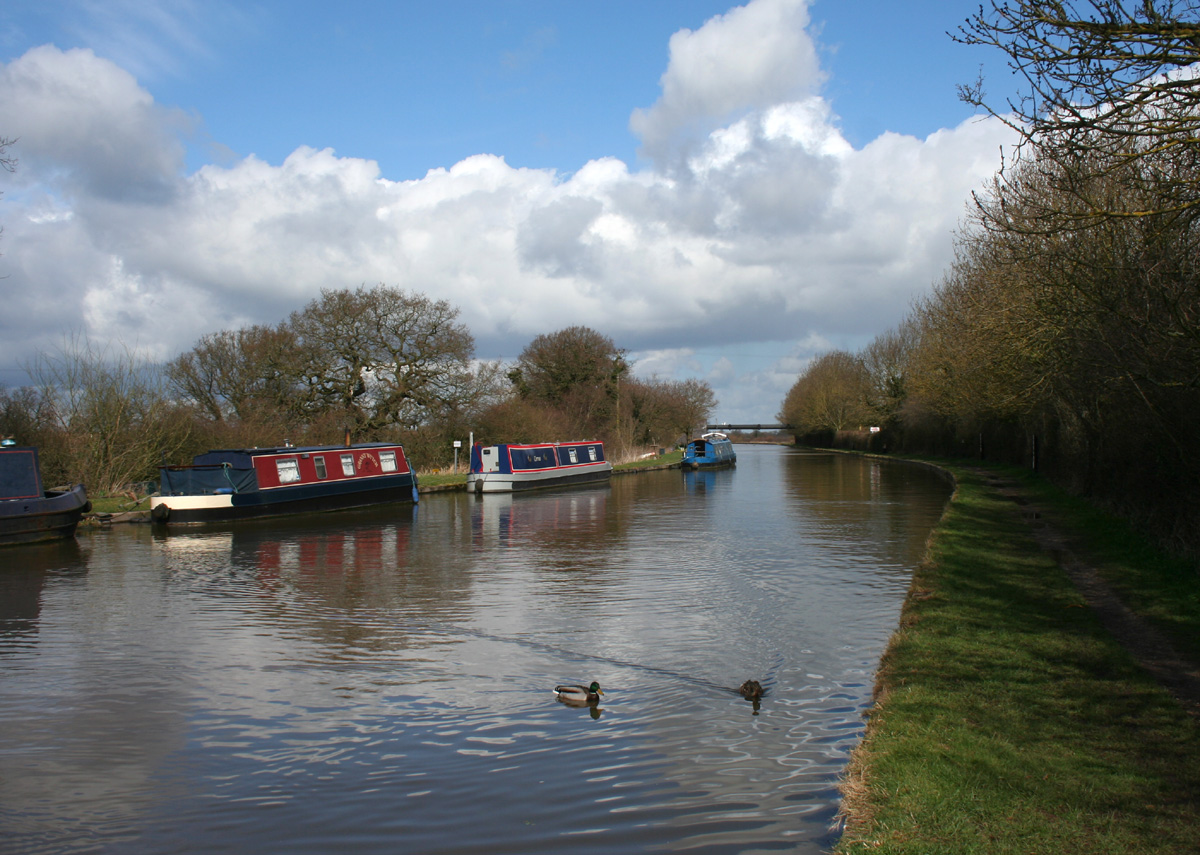
Shropshire Union Canal at Poole

The unclassified Wettenhall Road is the major road of the civil parish; it runs broadly north–south, leading to Wettenhall and Winsford to the north, and joining the A51 near Nantwich to the south. It crosses a brook at SJ639550, south of Poole Bank Farm, via a red sandstone bridge, which dates from the early 19th century and is listed at grade II. Pool Old Hall Lane runs eastwards from Wettenhall Road to join Barons Road near Worleston, Dairy Lane runs northeastwards to join the B5074, and Poole Hill Road runs westwards to connect with the A51. The National Cycle Network Regional Route 75 follows Wettenhall Road. The Crewe and Nantwich Circular Walk runs north–south through the east of the civil parish.

The area is predominantly rural, with the major land use being agricultural, particularly dairy farming. Local industries include a plant nursery (SJ637557) and machine knitting centre (SJ639553). A tea shop is located adjacent to the machine knitting centre.

== Demography ==
The total population of the civil parish was estimated as 90 in 2006. In the 2001 census, the population was 101. The population has declined since 1801; the historical population figures were 168 (1801), 167 (1851), 155 (1901) and 99 (1951).

== Places of worship ==
Poole Methodist Chapel is a Wesleyan Methodist Chapel on Wettenhall Road (SJ636558); it is listed at grade II. Built in 1834 and largely unaltered externally, the design is typical of early Methodist churches. The single-storey red-brick building has a slate roof and encloses a single rectangular room used for worship. The entrance features a semi-circular fanlike arch above the door, with a dated tablet above. There are four windows with Y-tracery and pointed arches. The interior was affected by dry rot and was replaced in 1954. It belongs to the Nantwich section of the Nantwich Circuit.

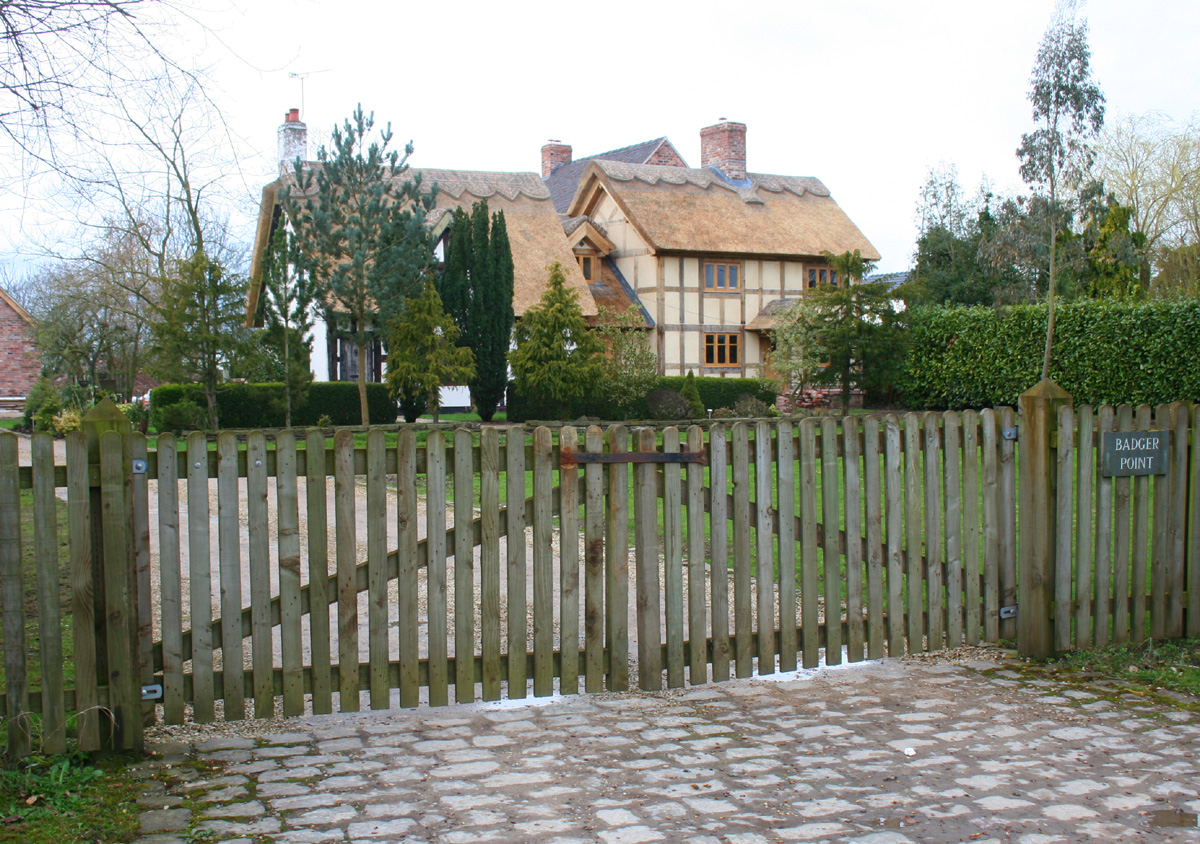
Badger Point

== Other landmarks ==
Poole Hall on Cinder Lane (SJ6455755137) was built in 1812–7 for William Massey of Chester, possibly to the design of Lewis Wyatt, on the site of an earlier building. It is listed at grade II*. The two-storey building is in red brick with sandstone trimming, and features a semicircular porch with four unfluted Ionic columns. Nikolaus Pevsner considered the interior to be "exceptionally fine". The park was designed by John Webb; it includes an L-shaped ornamental pond, possibly the remains of a moat to the earlier building. A timber-framed barn to the north of the hall, dating from the late 17th century, is also listed at grade II.

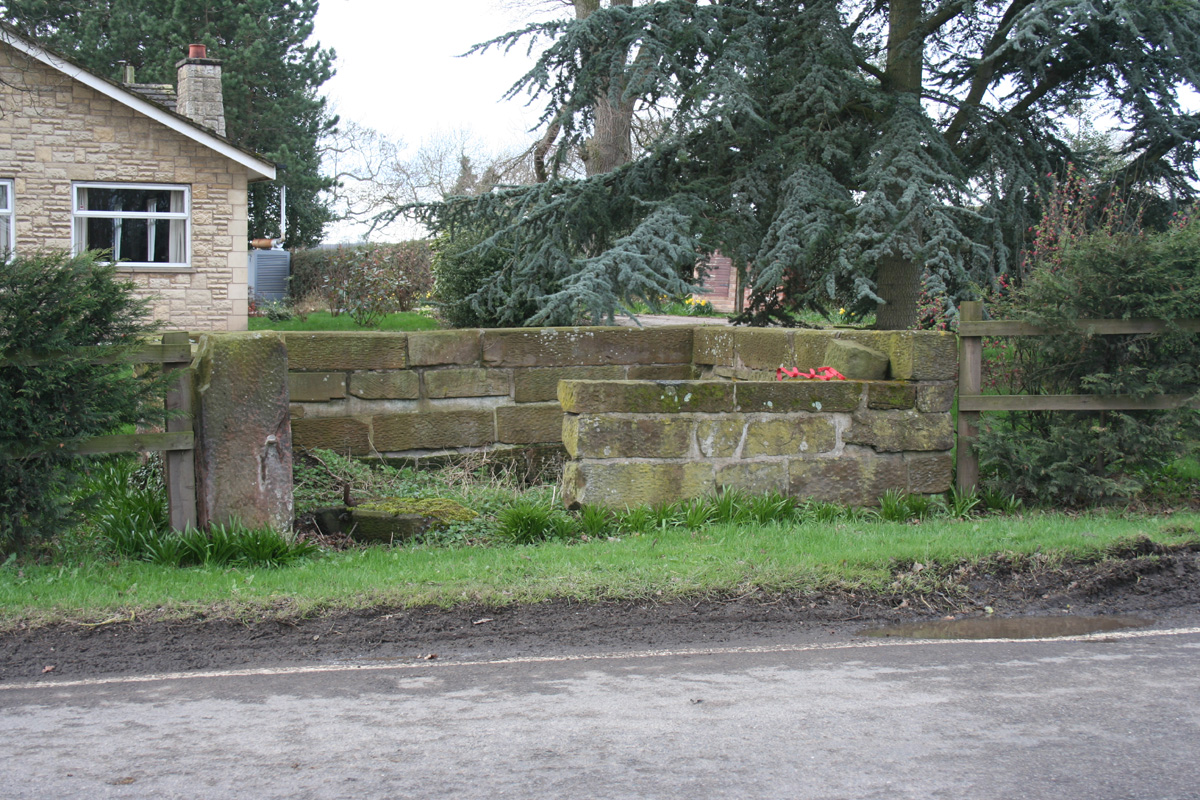
Pinfold, near Poole Bank

Two further timber-framed, grade-II-listed buildings survive within the civil parish; both are on Wettenhall Road. Poole Bank Farmhouse (SJ6404055382) is a T-shaped, two-storey building with a tile roof. Badger Point (SJ6370955723) is a single-storey building with a thatched roof. Both date from the mid-17th century and feature small framing with a brick infill. The grade-II-listed Poole Farmhouse (SJ6401155791) originally dates from the mid-17th century; a two-storey, T-shaped building in red brick, it features pilasters at its corners.

A grade-II-listed pinfold or cattle pound, dating from the early 19th century, stands at the junction of Wettenhall Road and Pool Old Hall Lane, near Poole Bank (SJ6391855431). Constructed of red sandstone blocks, the pinfold is a rectangular enclosure of around 3 metres^{2}; the gate is missing. Pinfolds were maintained by the lord of the manor; stray livestock were rounded up and confined in the enclosure by an official termed a "pinder", with a fine being imposed for their release.

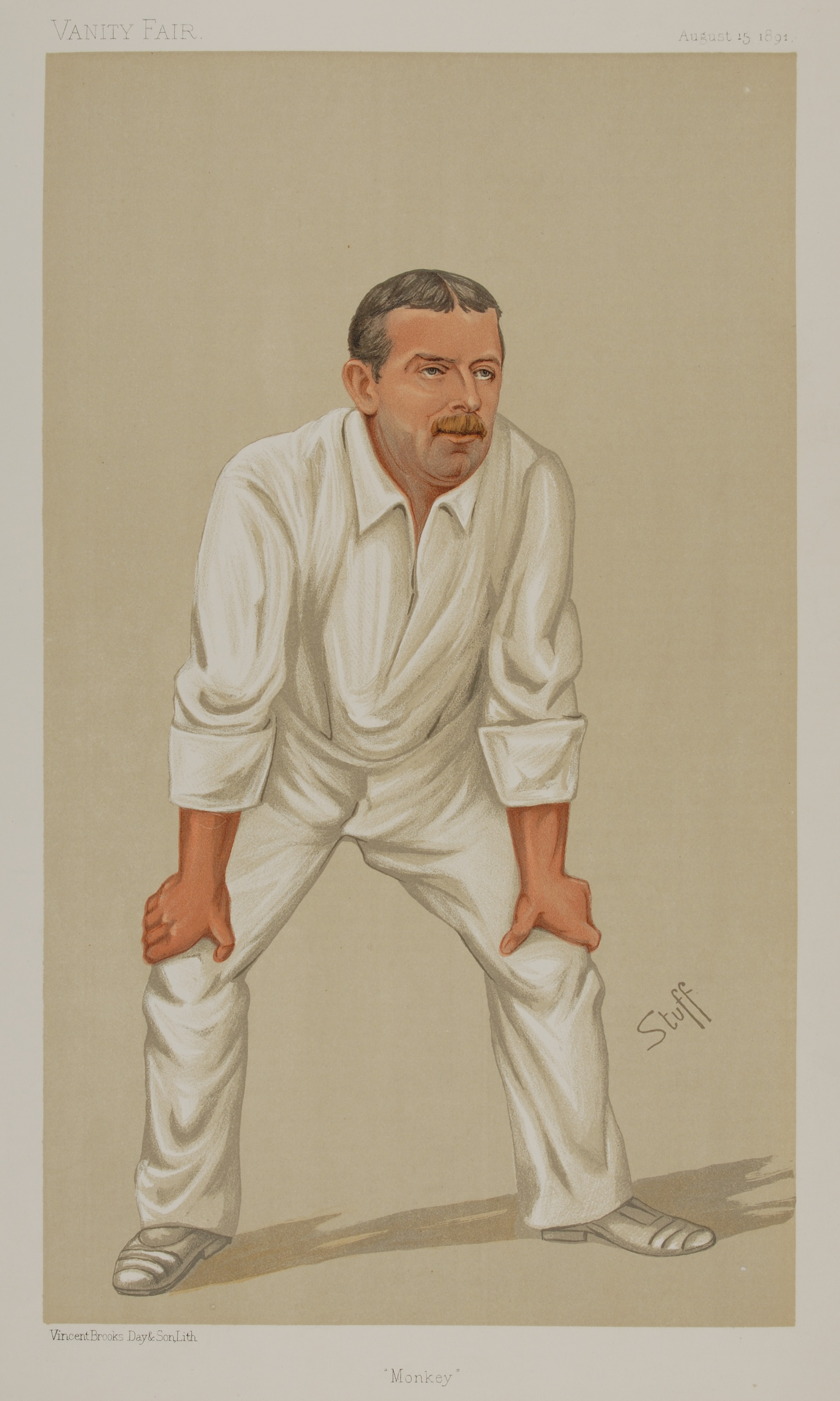
A. N. Hornby from Vanity Fair, 1891

== Education ==
There are no educational facilities within the civil parish. Poole falls within the catchment areas of St Oswald's Worleston Church of England Primary School in Aston juxta Mondrum, and Malbank School and Sixth Form College in Nantwich.

== Notable residents ==
The 19th-century cricketer A. N. Hornby lived at Poole Hall, as did his father, William Henry Hornby, MP for Blackburn. Sir William Holland, MP, also lived in the hall in 1904.

== See also ==
- Listed buildings in Poole, Cheshire
