= Aston juxta Mondrum =

Village in Cheshire, England

Coordinates: 53.106°N 2.521°W

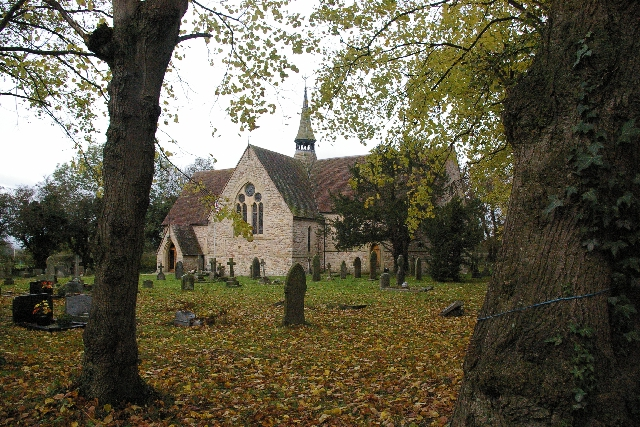
- St Oswald's Church, Worleston

- Location within Cheshire
- Population: 292 (2011)
- OS grid reference: SJ651567
- Civil parish: Aston juxta Mondrum
- Unitary authority: Cheshire East
- Ceremonial county: Cheshire
- Region: North West
- Country: England
- Sovereign state: United Kingdom
- Post town: NANTWICH
- Postcode district: CW5
- Dialling code: 01270
- Police: Cheshire
- Fire: Cheshire
- Ambulance: North West
- UK Parliament: Chester South and Eddisbury

Aston juxta Mondrum is a village and civil parish in the unitary authority of Cheshire East and the ceremonial county of Cheshire, England. It is about four miles north of Nantwich. The civil parish also includes part of Worleston village.

== Toponymy ==
The name of the village means "Aston near Mondrum [forest]", presumably to set it apart from other places named "Aston". In 1321, however, the place is called "Aston in Mondrum" – that is, it is within the forest of Delamere-Mondrum, TNA CHES 29/33 m 16.

== History ==
The village is mentioned in the Domesday Book as consisting of three households, and was held by William Malbank. Later on, Thomas lord of Crewe granted his sister Sibill all his lordship of Aston as well as lands in Cholmondeston. Worleston Dairy Institute was located in the civil parish, and received a royal visit from George V and Queen Mary in 1913. The institute closed in 1926.

== Demographics ==
Historical population
Year	Pop.	±%
1801	111	—
1851	171	+54.1%
1901	194	+13.5%
1951	141	−27.3%
2001	133	−5.7%
2011	292	+119.5%

According to the 2001 census, the parish had a population of 133, in 55 households. The population of the civil parish had risen at the 2011 census to 292. The historical population figures were 111 (1801), 171 (1851), 194 (1901) and 141 (1951).

== Landmarks ==
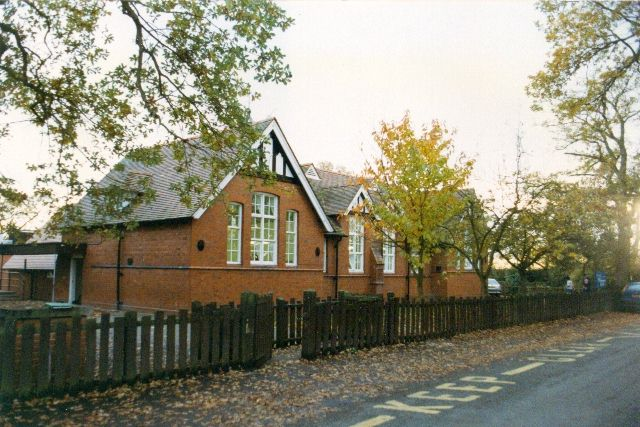
St Oswald's School in 1996

The grade-II-listed St Oswald's Church, founded 1873, is in Worleston village. A major fire in 1997 damaged the roof, chancel and organ loft; the church has since been restored. St Oswald's has been administered since 1991 as a united benefice, the Cross Country Group of Parish Churches, with St Mary's, Acton, St Bartholomew's, Church Minshull, and St David's, Wettenhall. It falls into the rural deanery of Nantwich and the diocese of Chester. Since 2014, the vicar has been the Reverend Anne Lawson.

St Oswald's CE Primary School (SJ652567) on Church Lane was originally Worleston National School and is still often referred to as "Worleston School". The present building dates from 1887, although there are records of the school as early as 1863.

== See also ==
- Listed buildings in Aston juxta Mondrum
