= Worleston =

Village in Cheshire, England

Coordinates: 53.101°N 2.516°W

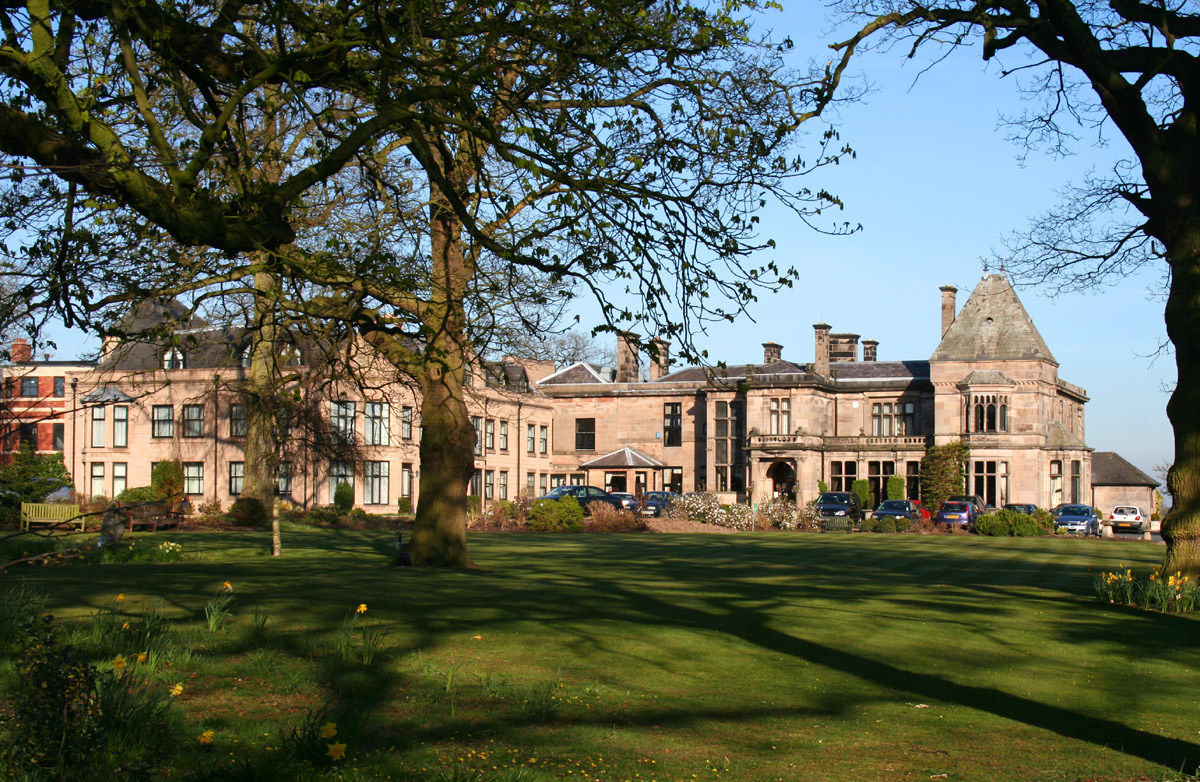
- Rookery Hall, Worleston

- Location within Cheshire
- Population: 452 (2011)
- OS grid reference: SJ654560
- Civil parish: Worleston
- Unitary authority: Cheshire East
- Ceremonial county: Cheshire
- Region: North West
- Country: England
- Sovereign state: United Kingdom
- Post town: NANTWICH
- Postcode district: CW5
- Dialling code: 01270
- Police: Cheshire
- Fire: Cheshire
- Ambulance: North West
- UK Parliament: Chester South and Eddisbury

Worleston is a village (at SJ658564) and civil parish in Cheshire, England, 2 1/2 miles north of Nantwich and 3 miles west of Crewe. The civil parish, which also includes Beambridge, Rease Heath, Mile End and Rookery, had a population at the 2011 Census of 452.

== History ==
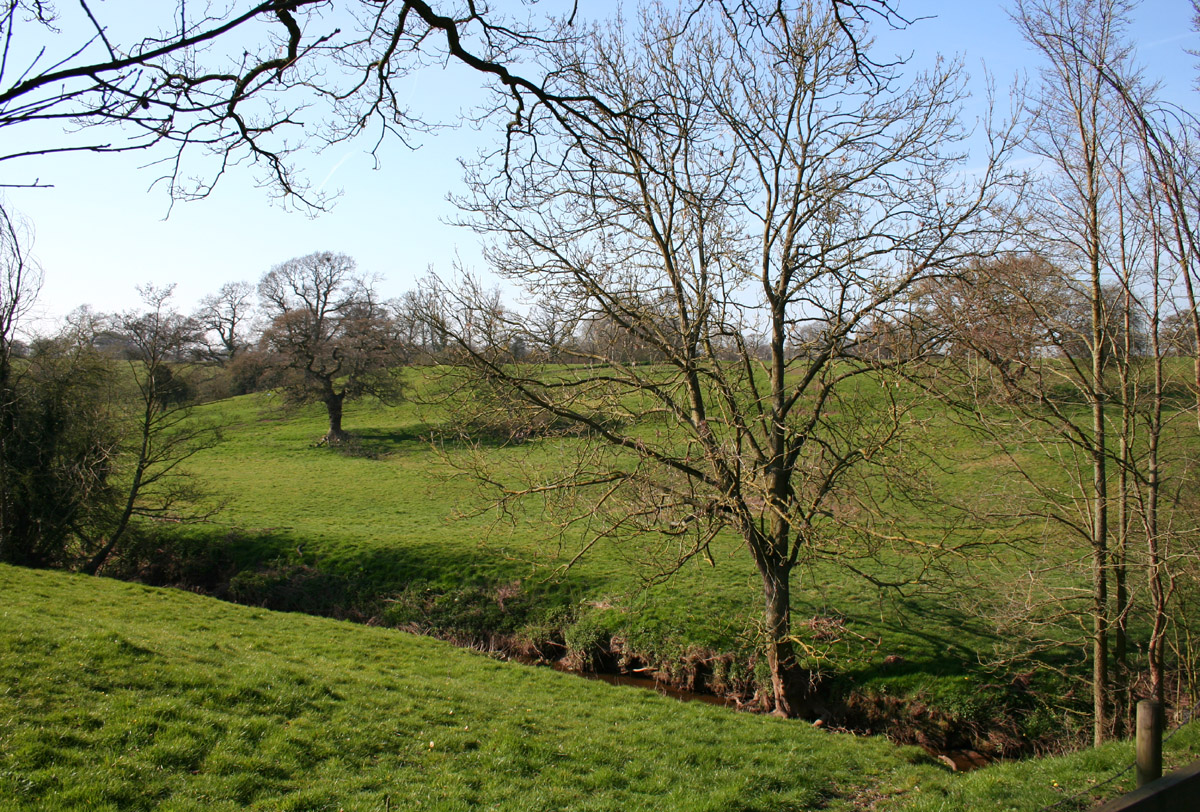
Tributary of the Weaver

Historically, Worleston civil parish was included within the ancient parish of Acton, and St Mary's Church, Acton was the parish church. The small civil parish of Alvaston was added to Worleston in 1899, and part of the parish was transferred to Nantwich in 1936.

== Geography and transport ==
Nearby villages include Acton, Aston juxta Mondrum, Willaston and Wistaston. The River Weaver forms the eastern boundary of the parish, with a tributary running east–west across the parish, south of Rookery Hall. Other Weaver tributaries form parts of the south-eastern, western and northern parish boundaries. The Reaseheath College at Rease Heath has a lake, and there are numerous small meres and ponds scattered across the farmland.

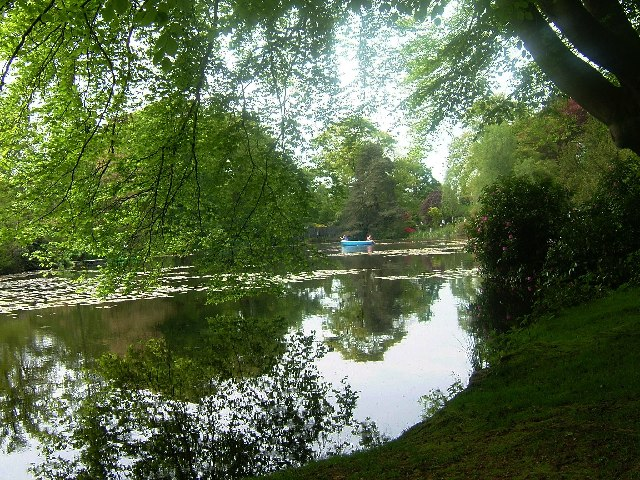
Reaseheath College lake

The A51 runs east–west along the southern boundary of the parish, and the B5074 road runs north–south through it, crossing the tributary of the Weaver at Rookery Bridge. The Crewe–Chester railway line crosses the northern tip of the parish. The civil parish has relatively few public footpaths, with none to the east of the B5074; the longest footpath cuts west from the B5074 to Rease Heath.

== Demographics ==
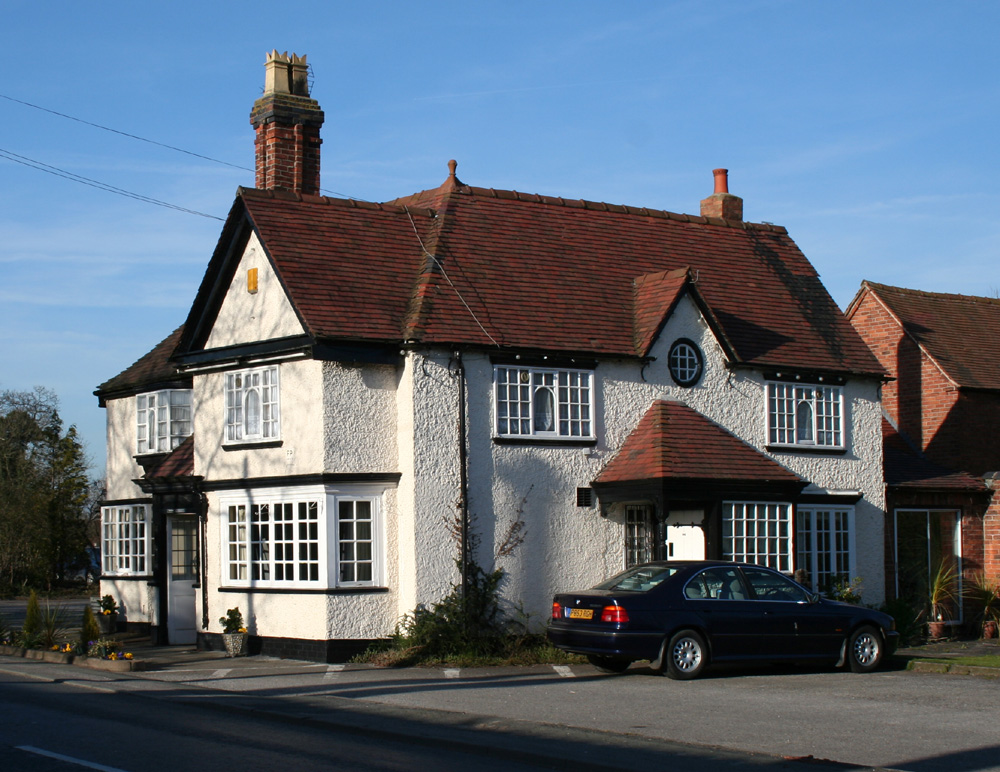
Royal Oak

According to the 2001 census, the parish had a population of 404, with 96 households. The historical population figures were 269 (1801), 337 (1851), 485 (1901) and 383 (1951); the changes partly reflect boundary alterations (described previously).

== Landmarks ==
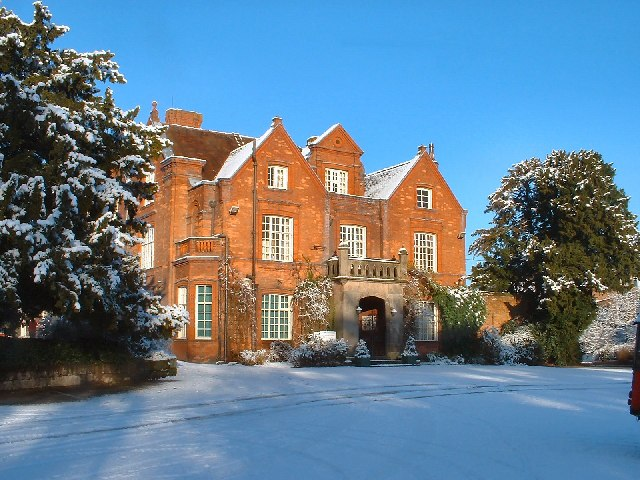
Reaseheath College

See also Listed buildings in Worleston

Rookery Hall, a grade-II-listed mansion dating from 1816, is located off the B5074 near Worleston village; it is now a hotel and restaurant. The Royal Oak public house, on the B5074 in Worleston village, is a timber-framed building dating originally from the 1730s.

The small settlement of Rease Heath (also spelled Reaseheath), adjacent to Nantwich, contains Reaseheath College, as well as the grade-II-listed Rease Heath Old Hall, an L-shaped farmhouse in red brick dating from the late 18th century. A moated site (SJ65095423) at Rease Heath is a scheduled ancient monument. The Crewe Alexandra F.C. Academy is adjacent to the college.

== Places of worship ==
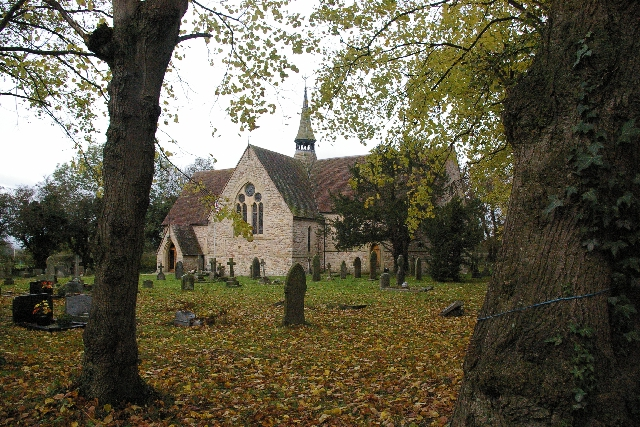
St Oswald's Church

The grade-II-listed St Oswald's Church, founded 1873, is in Worleston village (within Aston juxta Mondrum civil parish). A major fire in 1997 damaged the roof, chancel and organ loft; the church has since been restored. St Oswald's has been administered since 1991 as a united benefice, the Cross Country Group of Parish Churches, with St Mary's, Acton, St Bartholomew's, Church Minshull, and St David's, Wettenhall. It falls into the rural deanery of Nantwich and the diocese of Chester.The vicar is the Reverend Anne Lawson. A magazine, Cross Country, is circulated across all four churches.

Worleston Methodist Chapel was founded in 1871 and closed in 1969.

== Education ==
The village is served by the nearby St Oswald's CE Primary School (SJ652567), originally Worleston National School, on Church Road, Aston juxta Mondrum.

== See also ==
- Listed buildings in Worleston
