= Reaseheath Old Hall =

Country house in Cheshire, England

Coordinates: 53.08420°N 2.53280°W

Reaseheath Old Hall is a former country house in the parish of Worleston, to the north of Nantwich in Cheshire, England. It was bought in 1722 by the Tomkinson family of Dorfold. The house was rebuilt in 1878 in Queen Anne style with Jacobean features, and enlarged in 1892. It is now part of Reaseheath College. The house is constructed in brick on a sandstone plinth, with a slated roof. It has three storeys, is in five bays, and has an L-shaped plan. The central bay projects forward and has a gable pediment. In the middle storey is a three-light lunette window. The house is recorded in the National Heritage List for England as a designated Grade II listed building.

== See also ==
- Listed buildings in Worleston
