= Poole Methodist Chapel =

Coordinates: 53.09855°N 2.54432°W

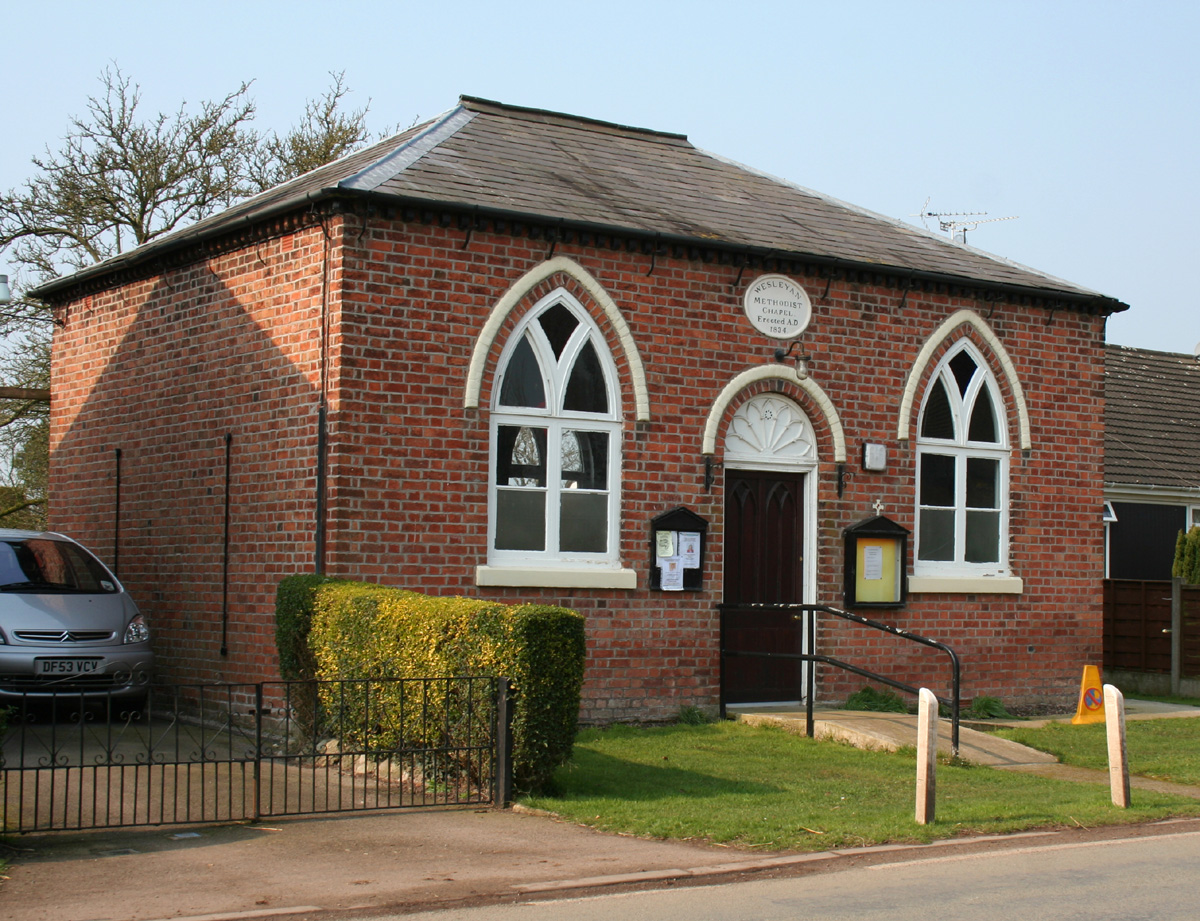
- Poole Methodist Chapel

- Location in Cheshire
- OS grid reference: SJ 637 558
- Location: Wettenhall Road, Poole, Cheshire
- Country: England
- Denomination: Methodist
- Website: Poole Methodist Chapel

Architecture
- Functional status: Active
- Heritage designation: Grade II
- Designated: 4 July 1986
- Architectural type: Chapel
- Style: Gothic Revival
- Completed: 1834

Specifications
- Materials: Brick, slate roof

Poole Methodist Chapel is in Wettenhall Road, Poole, Cheshire, England. It is an active Methodist church in the Cheshire South Methodist Circuit. The church is recorded in the National Heritage List for England as a designated Grade II listed building.

== History ==
The church was built in 1834 as a Wesleyan Methodist chapel.

== Architecture ==
=== Exterior ===
Poole Methodist Chapel is a small building with a square plan. It is constructed in red brick, and has a hipped slate roof. The chapel is in a single storey, and has an entrance front of three bays. The central door is panelled and is decorated with a Gothic motif. The doorway is round-headed, the fanlight being filled by a board decorated with seven radiating daggers. Above the doorway is a semicircular hood mould, over which is a lamp fitting and an elliptical panel inscribed with "Wesleyan Methodist Chapel" and the date 1834. The door is flanked on each side by a Gothic-style arched window containing Y-tracery, over which is a pointed hood mould. Under the eaves, the bricks form a dentilled pattern.

=== Interior ===
Inside the chapel is a wooden panelled reading desk on a moulded plinth with an ogee cornice. On each side of the reading desk is a flight of three steps with balusters and newels. The reredos is also panelled, the central panel being wider than the outer panels, and with a semicircular head. The reredos is decorated with motifs including garlands and roses. Also in the chapel are a communion table with communion rails, and a treadle organ.

== See also ==
- Listed buildings in Poole, Cheshire
