= Church Minshull =

Village and civil parish in Cheshire, England

Coordinates: 53.14°N 2.5°W

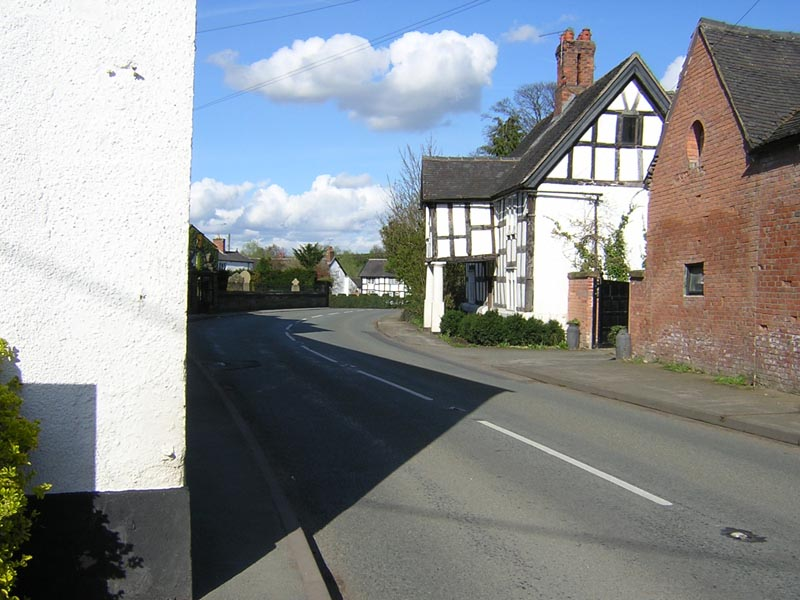
- View of main road

- Location within Cheshire
- Population: 426 (2011 Census)
- OS grid reference: SJ666604
- Unitary authority: Cheshire East
- Ceremonial county: Cheshire
- Region: North West
- Country: England
- Sovereign state: United Kingdom
- Post town: Nantwich
- Postcode district: CW5
- Dialling code: 01270
- Police: Cheshire
- Fire: Cheshire
- Ambulance: North West
- UK Parliament: Chester South and Eddisbury
- Website: Church Minshull Parish Council

Church Minshull is a village and civil parish in the unitary authority of Cheshire East and the ceremonial county of Cheshire, England. The village is approximately 5 miles (8.0 km) north west of Crewe, just west of the River Weaver and Shropshire Union Canal. The principal road through Church Minshull is the B5074 between Nantwich (6 miles to the south) and Winsford (4 miles to the north). The modern village centre is a designated conservation area which contains many houses of Tudor style architecture. A large area in the east of the parish falls within the Weaver Valley Area of Special County Value.

The population at the 2001 Census was 431, living in 196 residences of which sixty are on Home Farm Park and twenty on Village Farm. The parish is made up of 2,285 acres (9.25 km^{2}). The population at the 2011 Census had reduced slightly to 426.

== History ==
The name of the village is recorded in the Domesday Book as Maneshale.

According to records from November 1824, numerous trades and crafts were carried out in the village: blacksmith, wheelwright, joiners, cordwainer, gamekeeper, bricklayer, weaver, tailor, carrier, victualler, laundry woman and many domestic servants. There was also a shopkeeper, butcher, two school mistresses and a school master, farmers and farm workers, paupers and spinsters.

The current village church, St Bartholomew's Church, was built on the site of an earlier place of worship between 1702 and 1704. A village school was built in the churchyard in 1785. In 1858 a new school was constructed on part of the Church Minshull Estate, which had been in the Brooke family for several generations. The school closed after 124 years on the 22 July 1982 and the pupils transferred to Worleston School. There is a public house, the Badger, occupying a listed building next to the church.

The Village Hall was built in 1963 and modernised in 2003.

Home Farm Park was started in about 1958. The site was sold several times and greatly extended over the years to its present size of 65 plots. The shop, post office and petrol station closed in the 1990s and were sold off separately. In 1989, Village Farm was sold to a developer and the old buildings and farm house were converted to eight houses and twelve new houses built on the site; these were finally occupied in 1999. This was the first major housing project in the village.

== See also ==
- Listed buildings in Church Minshull
- St Bartholomew's Church, Church Minshull
