= Poole Hall =

Country house in Cheshire, England

Coordinates: 53.0923°N 2.5308°W

Poole Hall is a Regency mansion at Poole, near Nantwich in Cheshire, England. It dates from 1812 to 1817 and is recorded in the National Heritage List for England as a designated Grade II* listed building. Nikolaus Pevsner considered the interior to be "exceptionally fine". The hall is a private residence and is not open to the public.

== History ==
The manor of White-Poole was held by the Elcock or Elcocke family from around 1600. An earlier house on the site of the present hall was in existence in 1622. The manor passed into the Massey family early in the 19th century, on the marriage of the heiress Elizabeth Elcocke to the Reverend William Massey, rector of Ditchingham in Norfolk. The present hall was built in 1812–17 for their second son, also William Massey, possibly to the design of Lewis Wyatt.

The Massey family retained ownership of the hall until around 1900. Towards the end of the 19th century it was rented out; tenants included the cricketer A. N. Hornby, as well as his father, William Henry Hornby, MP for Blackburn. Sir William Holland, MP, was living in the hall in 1904.

After several changes of ownership, the hall was purchased in 1988 by Tony Hill, a property developer, who undertook restoration work on the house and also enlarged the estate from 27 acres (110,000 m^{2}) to 168 acres (0.68 km^{2}). An avid collector, Hill used the house and its outbuildings to display his extensive collection of antiques, collectibles and cars. Antiques expert Paul Hayes described the collection as including "dozens of teas-maids, lamp stands, mannequins, toy robots, an old pinball machine and ... a stag's head". The car collection included Keith Richards' Bentley, nicknamed "Blue Lena". Hill sold the estate in 2007.

== Description ==
=== Exterior ===
The house is located at the end of Cinder Lane at SJ6455755137. The two-storey building is in red brick with sandstone trimming under a slate roof. It has three bays to the front and six bays to the south side; a five-bay service wing on the north side is set back with a lower roof. The front face has a semicircular porch with four unfluted Ionic columns. The entrance door is flanked by pilasters and has a fluted frieze. The south side features a prominent canted bay window. The corner finials to the parapet are carved in the form of pineapples.

=== Interior ===
Nikolaus Pevsner described the hall's Regency interiors as "exceptionally fine". The four-bay drawing room has a shallow tunnel-vaulted ceiling, panelled in rectangles and octagons and decorated with foliage scrolls, and a frieze with gilt palmettes. At the west side of the room, a screen of two unfluted columns and two Corinthian pilasters supports a decorative beam. The marble Grecian chimneypiece incorporates two female figures. Pevsner described the ceiling as "elegant", and Marcus Binney compares the room with Robert Adam's library at Kenwood House, Hampstead Heath.

The dining room has a shallow alcove at the north side, flanked by pilasters, with a shell-shaped ceiling and a scrollwork frieze. The plasterwork features vines and leaves, and the white marble chimneypiece is decorated with wreaths and torches. The main staircase is cantilevered and follows all four walls of the stair hall; it has limestone steps, a balustrade with cast-iron scrollwork and a mahogany handrail. The sitting room and study contain oak panelling. A window contains stained glass panels dating from the mid-16th and 17th centuries, which possibly originated in the earlier house. The hall's service areas are well preserved, and contain old cooking ranges, meat hooks and a foothole ladder to the attics.

== Outbuildings and park ==
The gardens and park were designed by landscape gardener John Webb of Lichfield in 1815–19. The grounds contain a walled garden, yew hedge and an L-shaped ornamental pond, possibly the remains of a moat to the earlier building. The Crewe and Nantwich Circular Walk passes through the estate.

The outbuildings include a coach house, stables and former forge, as well as various cottages and barns. To the north of the hall stands a two-storey, timber-framed barn, dating from the late 17th century, which is listed at grade II. The barn rests on a sandstone plinth and features small framing with a brick infill.

== See also ==
- Grade II* listed buildings in Cheshire East
- Listed buildings in Poole, Cheshire
