= St Oswald's Church, Worleston =

Coordinates: 53.1072°N 2.5223°W

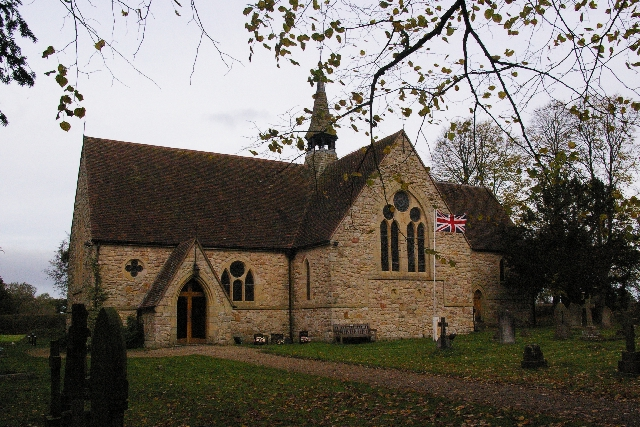
- St Oswald's Church, Worleston, from the south

- Location in Cheshire
- OS grid reference: SJ 651 568
- Location: Church Road, Worleston, Cheshire
- Country: England
- Denomination: Anglican
- Website: St Oswald, Worleston

History
- Status: Parish church
- Dedication: Saint Oswald

Architecture
- Functional status: Active
- Heritage designation: Grade II
- Designated: 6 July 1984
- Architect: Charles Lynam
- Architectural type: Church
- Style: Gothic Revival
- Groundbreaking: 1872
- Completed: 1874

Specifications
- Materials: Stone, tile roofs

Administration
- Province: York
- Diocese: Chester
- Archdeaconry: Macclesfield
- Deanery: Nantwich
- Parish: St Oswald, Worleston

Clergy
- Priest: Revd Ann Lawson

St Oswald's Church is in Church Road, Worleston, Cheshire, England. It is an active Anglican parish church in the deanery of Nantwich, the archdeaconry of Macclesfield, and the diocese of Chester. Its benefice is combined with those of St Mary, Acton, St Bartholomew, Church Minshull, and St David, Wettenhall. The church is recorded in the National Heritage List for England as a designated Grade II listed building.

== History ==
The foundation stone was laid on 19 September 1872. The church was designed by Charles Lynam, an architect from Stoke-on-Trent, and opened in November 1874. It sustained major damage by a fire in December 1997, and has since been rebuilt.

== Architecture ==
=== Exterior ===
St Oswald's is constructed in rubble stone with tiled roofs. Its plan is cruciform, consisting of a two-bay nave with a south porch, north and south transepts, and a two-bay chancel. Over the crossing is a flèche. Most of the windows are lancet windows. On the gables of the chancel, nave and transepts are cross finials.

=== Interior ===
Inside the church, three steps lead up from the nave to the chancel, the risers of which bear an inscription. At the top of the steps is a low stone wall surmounted by a brass rail. A further three steps, also with risers baring inscriptions, lead up to the altar. The sanctuary has a mosaic floor. On the south side of the sanctuary is a sedilia and a piscina. In the south wall of the chancel is a priest's door, and in the north wall a door leads into the vestry. The circular pulpit is carried on seven shafts. The stone font is cup-shaped on a cruciform base. The stained glass in the east window is by Kempe, and depicts a crucifix with Saint Mary, Saint John, Saint Oswald, and Saint Werburgh. In the north transept is a memorial window to Baron William Henry Schroder of nearby Rookery Hall. This was made by Morris & Co. and depicts the Good Shepherd and Saint Hubert. In the south transept are windows with depictions of Noah, Abraham, David, and Daniel. The glass in the west window includes images of Hannah with Samuel, and Saint Elizabeth. The two-manual organ stands on the north wall of the chancel.

== See also ==
- Listed buildings in Aston juxta Mondrum
