= Reaseheath College & University Centre =

Further education college

Coordinates: 53.0835°N 2.5273°W

Reaseheath College
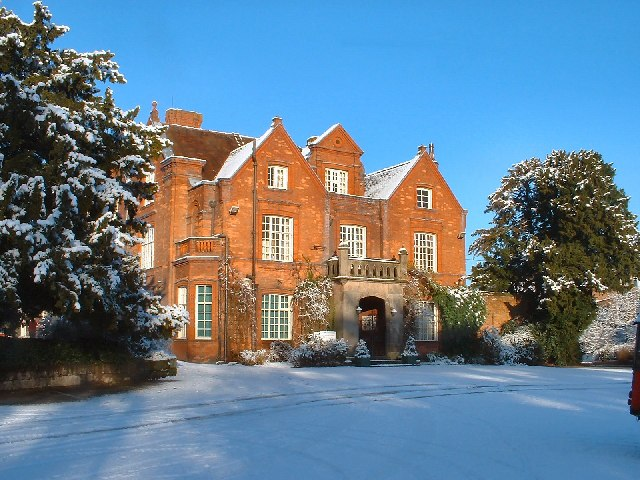
- Reaseheath Hall
- Nantwich, Cheshire, CW5 6DF

Information
- Type: Further education college
- Department for Education URN: 130623 Tables
- Ofsted: Reports
- Age: 16+
- Website: www.reaseheath.ac.uk

University Centre Reaseheath
- Type: University college
- Location: Nantwich, Cheshire, CW5 6DF
- Website: ucreaseheath.ac.uk

Reaseheath College & University Centre is a specialist land-based further education college and higher education university college in Nantwich, Cheshire, United Kingdom. Established in 1921, Reaseheath College began providing higher education in 1988 and later became an Associate College of the University of Chester in 2009, before coming the University Centre Reaseheath (UCR) in 2016.

Reaseheath College & University Centre are members of the Land Based Colleges Aspiring to Excellence (Landex).

== Origins and history ==
The history of Reaseheath goes back centuries and it is even recorded that a Roman road goes through the site.

In 1919, both the Reaseheath estate and the nearby Henhull Hall were bought by the Cheshire County Council for a 'Farm Institute'. Two years later, this resulted in The Cheshire School of Agriculture (now called Reaseheath College) opening in 1921, originally just to male students only. Female students were allowed to join in 1926.

In 1967, the School changed its name to The Cheshire College of Agriculture, before becoming Reaseheath College in 1993.

When the college first opened in 1921, only courses in Agriculture, Horticulture, Poultry and Dairying were offered.

During World War II, normal education at the School of Agriculture was interrupted and instead the school was used for training recruits in the Women's Land Army (WLA). By February 1943, over one thousand WLA recruits had completed their courses at the School; an achievement which earned royal commendation for Cheshire.

During the wartime period, part of the education block on campus was also occupied by the staff of the War Agricultural Executive Committee and the National Milk Testing and Advisory Service.

== Courses and faculties ==
The college offers courses in adventure sports, agriculture, agricultural engineering, animal management, business and events management, construction, countryside, equine, floristry, food, horticulture, motor vehicle, public services and sports studies.

University Centre Reaseheath shares the same campus and offers a variety of higher education degrees and foundation degrees in areas such as Animal Science, Equine Science, Rural Business Management, Conservation, Food Science, Bakery and Patisserie, Agriculture, and more.

The higher education courses offered at University Centre Reaseheath are in conjunction with the University of Chester.

The college's main base is at Reaseheath, but there are also Outreach Centres at Burrows Lane, Merseyside, and Croft End Equestrian Centre, Oldham.

Residential accommodation for around 1,000 students is available to both further and higher education students on the main campus site.

Marcus Clinton is Reaseheath's current Principal, and the sixth person to hold this role since the college opened in 1921.

Glover Agriculture currently operate the ownership of the land at Reaseheath college, with Cheshire County Council as their main client.

== Notable students ==
- James Cornford, first-class cricketer

== See also ==
- Reaseheath Old Hall
