= Rookery Hall =

Hotel in Cheshire, England

Coordinates: 53.099°N 2.510°W

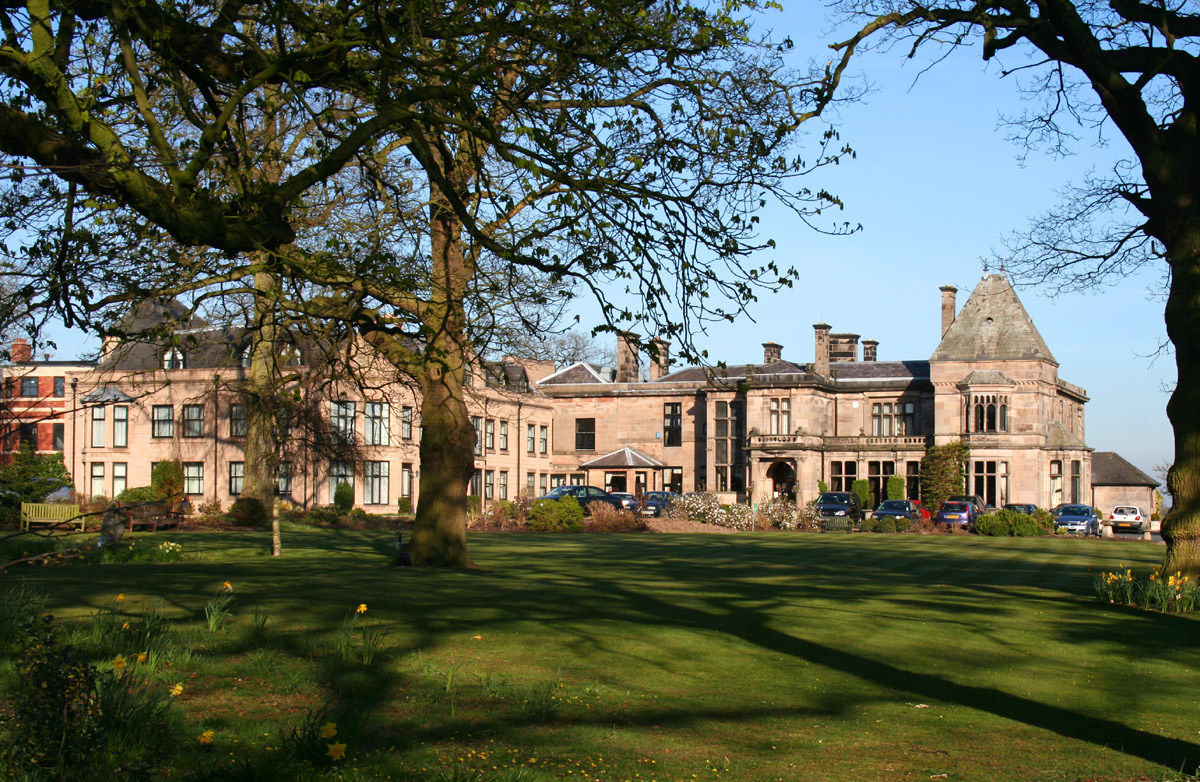
Rookery Hall

Rookery Hall is a Georgian style mansion located off the B5074 road near the village of Worleston in Cheshire, England. Dating originally from 1816 but extensively altered in the late 19th century, the hall is listed at grade II. Since 2001 Rookery Hall has been owned and managed by Julia Hands, Hand Picked Hotel Group. The Conference centre and Health Club and Spa were added in 2011.

== History ==
The hall dates from 1816, and was originally a plain late Georgian house in brick known as "The Rookery, Worleston". The first owner was William Hilton Cooke of Chester, who owned a Jamaican sugar plantation. The estate was purchased in 1867 by Baron William Henry von Schröder, a merchant banker and son of J. Henry Schröder, the founder of Schroders. It was extended and extensively altered into an Elizabethan style for von Schröder in around 1900. The estate was sold by von Schröder's son in 1947.

Rookery Hall was also owned by Ralph Midwood who was a cotton Merchant and race horse owner who added the stable block.

The hall became a hotel and restaurant in around 1975. A further 29 further bedrooms and a function room were added in 1990, and in 2007 the former stable block was converted into a health club and spa. Further expansion during 2007 included the building of a conference and banqueting centre and 39 executive bedrooms.

== Description ==
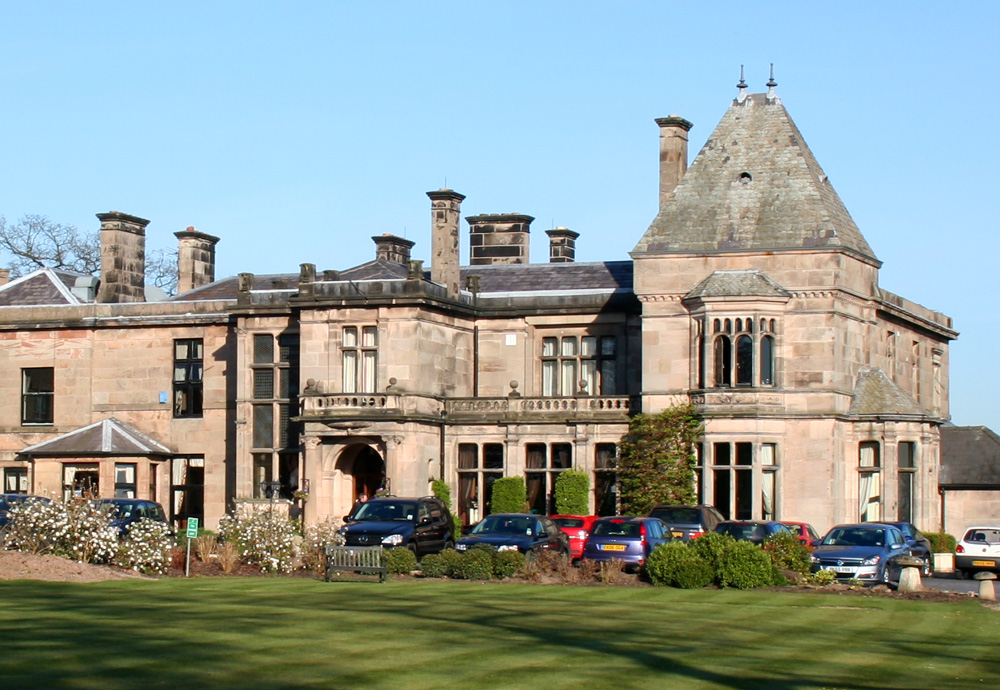
Main façade

The hall is neo-Elizabethan in style. It is constructed on an asymmetrical plan consisting of two storeys and five bays, of yellow sandstone ashlar cladding with a slate roof.

The corner tower has a wedge-shaped pavilion roof, reminiscent of a Loire Valley château; it is tiled in shaped green Westmorland slates. The projecting entrance porch is Corinthian in style, featuring a semi-circular arch and fluted pilasters supporting a first-floor balcony with ball finials to the balustrade. There is a similar balustraded balcony to the drawing room to the south of the porch. The porch windows feature metal grilles with scroll and leaf decoration.

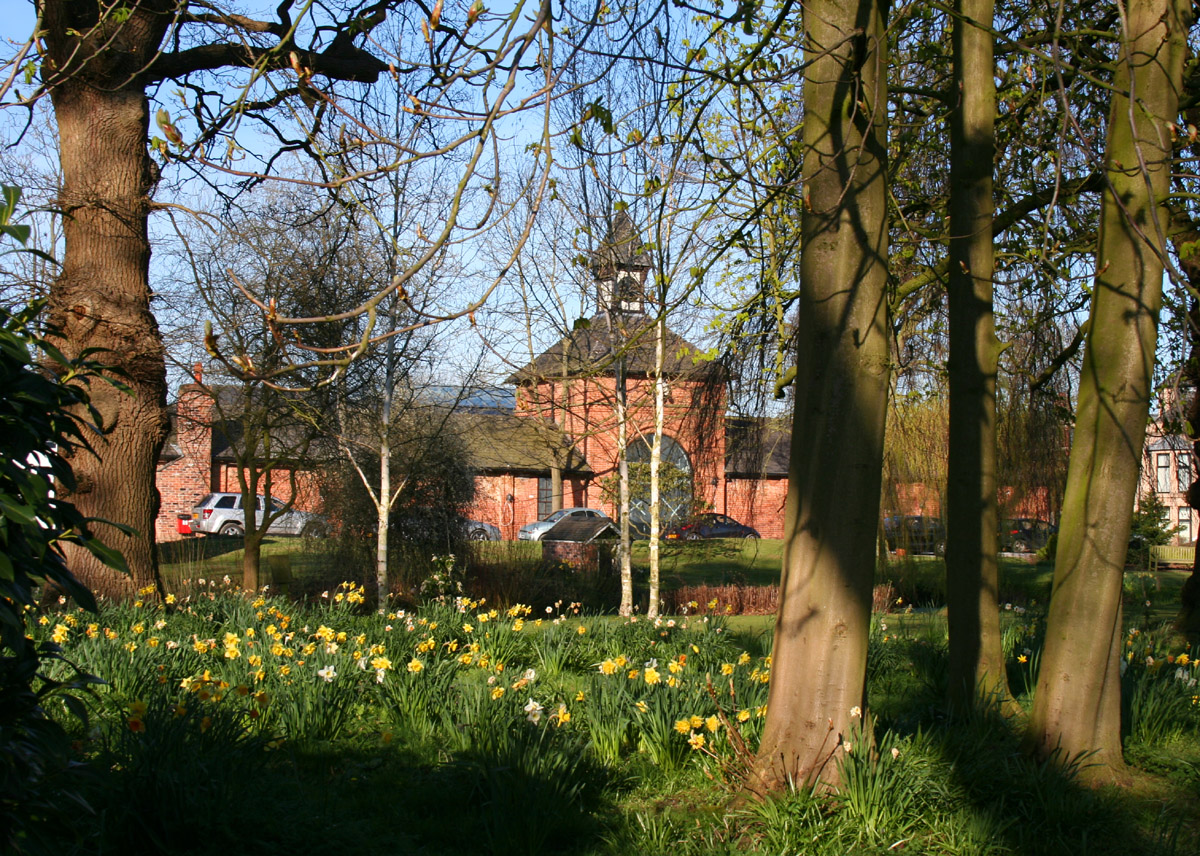
Gardens and former stables

To the north of the porch is a two-storey mullioned and transomed window flanked with pilasters, and most of the windows to the main façade are also mullioned and transomed. The service wing features a single-storey octagonal bay. The rear façade features two full-height bay windows, a balustrade at roof level, a cast-iron verandah with a glass roof and a balustraded terrace. The south-east corner has a wall sundial.

The hall is set in 38 acres (150,000 m^{2}) of parkland by the River Weaver, including gardens, woodland, a fountain and a small lake. The gardens are included in the Register of Parks and Gardens of Special Historic Interest in England.

=== Interior ===
The main reception rooms feature wood panelling and panelled ceilings. The dining room ceiling is vaulted with quatrefoils, coronets and shields, including the von Schröder coat of arms; the cornice features winged cherubs. The walnut panelling of the dining room features reeded pilasters. The panelling in the sitting room originated in Calveley Hall, now demolished; it is Jacobean in date and features a fluted frieze. The salon has a deep cornice with foliage decoration, and foliage and scrolls ornament the ceiling.

The Meissen corner fireplace in the salon is in marble and dates from 1880. A large stone Jacobethan fireplace with pilasters stands in the dining room; the sitting room has a small stone Jacobean-style fireplace. The staircase is in oak with twisted balusters, panelled newels and a panelled spandrel.

== Modern hotel ==
As of 2001, Rookery Hall is owned and managed by the Hand Picked Hotels group as a seventy-bedroom hotel, restaurant, conference centre, health club and spa. The hotel has four red AA stars and the restaurant two AA rosettes. It is licensed for civil wedding ceremonies.

David Beckham and Victoria Adams got engaged at Rookery Hall in 1998. The hotel management gave the couple an engagement cake depicting Rookery Hall with the couple sitting on top of it, which was later auctioned to benefit Goostrey Primary School.

== See also ==
- Listed buildings in Worleston
