= Listed buildings in Poole, Cheshire =

Poole is a civil parish in Cheshire East, England. It contains eight buildings that are recorded in the National Heritage List for England as designated listed buildings. Of these, one is listed at Grade II*, the middle grade, and the others are at Grade II. The parish is rural, and the listed buildings consist of a country house with an associated barn, farmhouses and farm buildings, a cottage, a bridge, a pinfold, and a chapel.

== Key ==
Grade	Criteria
II*	Particularly important buildings of more than special interest
II	Buildings of national importance and special interest

== Buildings ==
Name and location	Photograph	Date	Notes	Grade
Cottage, Poole Nurseries; 53.09746°N 2.54345°W	—	Mid 17th century	A timber-framed cottage on a stone plinth with rendered brick nogging and a thatched roof. It is in two storeys with an attic, and has a two-bay front. The windows are casements, those in the upper floor being in a gable, and in gabled dormer.	II
Poole Bank Farmhouse; 53.09439°N 2.53849°W	—	Mid 17th century	The farmhouse has been extended. The original part is timber-framed with brick nogging and a tiled roof. It is in two storeys and an attic, and has a three-bay front. A later brick wing at the rear gives the building a T-shaped plan. The windows are a mix of sashes and casements.	II
Poole Farmhouse; 53.09805°N 2.53895°W	—	Mid 17th century	Most of the farmhouse dates from the early 19th century, with the addition of a rear wing in the 20th century. It is built in brick with tiled roofs. The farmhouse has a T-shaped plan, it is in two storeys, and has a front of three bays. The windows are 20th-century casements.	II
Barn, Poole Hall; 53.09265°N 2.53060°W	—	Late 17th century	A timber-framed barn on a sandstone plinth with a slate roof. It contains heck doors, a loft door, and a casement window.	II
Poole Hall; 53.09226°N 2.53074°W	—	1812–17	A country house built in brick on a sandstone plinth with a hipped slate roof. It is in two storeys, and has an entrance front of three bays, a south front of six bays, and a service wing at the north of five bays. At the entrance is a porch with four unfluted ionic columns. The doorway has pilasters, a fluted frieze, an archivolt, and a fanlight. The windows are sashes, and at the top of the house is a cornice and a parapet with pineapple finials at the corners. On the south side is a large canted bay window. The interior is "exceptionally fine".	II*
Bridge; 53.09145°N 2.53932°W		Early 19th century	The bridge carries Wettenhall Road over a stream. It is built in sandstone and consists of a single segmental arch with inner and end piers.	II
Pinfold; 53.09520°N 2.54007°W		Early 19th century	The pinfold is constructed in sandstone and contains vertical jambs with hooks for a gate that is no longer present. It is about 1 metre (3.3 ft) high and 3 metres (9.8 ft) square.	II
Poole Methodist Chapel; 53.09855°N 2.54432°W		1834	Built as a Wesleyan Methodist chapel, it is in brick with a hipped slate roof. The chapel has a square plan, it is in a single storey, and has a three-bay front. Above the central doorway is a semicircular fanlight, and over this is an inscribed tablet. Flanking it are Gothic-style windows containing Y-tracery.	II
