= Listed buildings in Worleston =

Worleston is a civil parish in Cheshire East, England. It contains two buildings that are recorded in the National Heritage List for England as designated listed buildings, both of which are listed at Grade II. This grade is the lowest of the three gradings given to listed buildings and is applied to "buildings of national importance and special interest". The listed buildings are a former farmhouse, and a country house later converted into a hotel.

Name and location	Photograph	Date	Notes
Reaseheath Old Hall; 53.08423°N 2.53282°W	—	Late 18th century	A former farmhouse, built in brick on a sandstone plinth in late Georgian style, with a slate roof. With a rear wing, it has an L-shaped plan. The house is in three storeys with a symmetrical front of five bays, the central bay projecting forward under a stone pediment. There is another pediment above the central doorway. The windows are casements, with a three-light lunette in the middle floor of the central bay.
Rookery Hall; 53.09892°N 2.50936°W		Early 19th century	The original Georgian country house was extended and made more elaborate later in the 19th century. The building was converted into a hotel in the 20th century. It is built in sandstone with a slate roof, is in two storeys with a basement, and has a front of five bays. Its features include a Corinthian porch, mullioned windows, and a corner tower with a tall pyramidal roof.
