= Listed buildings in Church Minshull =

Church Minshull is a civil parish in Cheshire East, England. It contains 22 buildings that are recorded in the National Heritage List for England as designated listed buildings. Of these, four are listed at Grade II*, the middle grade, and the others are at Grade II. Apart from the village of Church Minshull the parish is rural. A high proportion of the listed buildings are houses or cottages, many of which are timber-framed, and date back to the 17th century. The Middlewich Branch of the Shropshire Union Canal and the River Weaver pass through the parish. Three structures associated with the canal are listed, a bridge, an aqueduct, and a former warehouse. The other listed buildings are farmhouses, farm buildings, the village church and its gates, a public house, and two bridges.

== Key ==
Grade	Criteria
II*	Particularly important buildings of more than special interest
II	Buildings of national importance and special interest

== Buildings ==
Name and location	Photograph	Date	Notes	Grade
Church Farm House; 53.14111°N 2.50041°W		Early 17th century	The original part of the farmhouse is timber-framed with brick nogging on a brick plinth, and it has a tiled roof. The farmhouse is in two storeys and has a three-bay front. There is a brick rear wing, giving the building an L-shaped plan. At the front, the upper part of the middle wing projects forward and is supported by two Tuscan columns, forming a porch over the doorway. The windows are casements. Inside the farmhouse is an inglenook.	II
Lee Green Farmhouse; 53.15805°N 2.50336°W	—	Early 17th century	A brick farmhouse with a tiled roof, later altered and expanded. It is in two storeys, and has a front of three bays, the right bay projecting forward and gabled, In the gable is applied timber-framing and a bargeboard. The left bay contains a bay window. The windows are casements.	II
Lee Green Hall; 53.15503°N 2.50496°W		Early 17th century	A brick farmhouse with slated roofs. It originally had a T-shaped plan, until the 19th century when an additional wing gave it an H-shaped plan. The house is in two storeys, and has a five-bay front. The windows are casements, and the gables have bargeboards.	II
Oakhurst; 53.14207°N 2.49959°W		Early 17th century	A timber-framed cottage with brick nogging and a tiled roof. It is in two storeys with a three-bay front. The windows are casements, and there is a small gabled porch. At the right end is a single-storey extension.	II
Old House; 53.14166°N 2.49955°W		Early 17th century	A cottage, partly in brick and partly timber-framed, with plastered brick nogging and a slated roof. It is in two storeys and has a three-bay front. There is a two-bay rear wing, giving the building a T-shaped plan. The windows are casements, and the gables have bargeboards and finials.	II
Smithy House; 53.14186°N 2.49958°W		Early 17th century	A timber-framed cottage with brick nogging and a tiled roof. It is in two storeys and has a four-bay front. The windows are casements. In front of the door is a gabled canopy that is supported by curved brackets.	II
Village Farmhouse; 53.14007°N 2.50298°W		Early 17th century	A brick farmhouse with a timber-framed core and a slate roof. It is in two storeys, and has a four-bay front. There is a two-bay rear wing, giving the house a T-shaped plan. The windows are casements, those in the upper floor being in gabled dormers with bargeboards.	II
Wade's Green Hall; 53.13325°N 2.51563°W	—	Early 17th century	A farmhouse, partly in brick, and partly timber-framed, with roofs of slate and tile. It is in two storeys with an attic, and has a three-bay front. There is a rear wing, giving the house an L-shaped plan. The door is flanked by reeded pilasters, and the windows are casements. There are three large timber-framed dormers, which are out of line with the windows below; they have bargeboards and finials.	II*
Bridge House; 53.14156°N 2.49892°W		Late 17th century	Alterations were made in the 18th and 19th centuries, including the addition of two towers. The house is in brick with a slate roof. It is in two storeys with an attic, and has a front of three bays. In the centre bay is a gabled brick porch. The windows are sashes. At the left end is a three-storey round tower, and at the right end is a four-storey tower.	II
Minshull Hall Farmhouse; 53.14739°N 2.51721°W	—	Late 17th century	The farmhouse has been altered, it is in brick on a stone plinth, and has a tiled roof. It is in two storeys with an attic, and has a three-bay front. The centre bay projects slightly, and has a brick porch with bargeboards. Above it, the attic window is in a gable with bargeboards and a finial. Most of the windows are sashes.	II*
Farm building, Minshull Hall Farm; 53.14720°N 2.51675°W	—	Late 17th century	A brick farm building with a tiled roof. It has a U-shaped plan, is in two storeys, and has a six-bay front. Between some of the bays are pilasters. The windows are casements.	II
Mill House; 53.14285°N 2.49972°W		1697	A timber-framed house with plastered brick nogging on a brick and stone plinth, It has a slated roof, is in two storeys, and has a four-bay front with two gables. The gabled bays project forward, the apexes of the gables are jettied, and between them is a gabled half-dormer. On the front is a single-storey timber-framed porch, and on the end gables are bargeboards and finials. The windows are casements.	II*
St Bartholomew's Church; 53.14146°N 2.50053°W		1702	The previous timber-framed church on the site deteriorated into a dangerous condition, and the tower was rebuilt in 1702, followed by the body of the church. There were restorations in 1861 and 1891. A further major restoration took place between 2002 and 2012, with the provision of additional facilities. The church is constructed in brick with stone dressings, and has a roof of slate and lead. It is in Neoclassical style, its plan consisting of a nave, a chancel with an apse, and a west tower.	II*
Gates and piers, St Bartholomew's Church; 53.14126°N 2.50052°W		c. 1702	The gate piers are in rusticated sandstone and have moulded caps and ball finials. Between them is a pair of cast iron gates. Rising from the piers is a wrought iron overthrow carrying a lantern.	II
Ashbrook Bridge; 53.15889°N 2.51562°W	—	Late 18th century	The bridge carries the B5074 road over Ash Brook. It is built in sandstone and consists of a single arch. At the ends of the approach parapets are piers with pyramidal caps.	II
The Badger; 53.14113°N 2.50077°W		Late 18th century	A brick public house with a roughcast front, and a slate roof. The main block is in three storeys and three bays, with a two-bay two-storey wing to the left. In the top storey above the semicircular doorway is a window with a semicircular head in a gable. This is flanked by flat-roofed dormers. The windows are sashes.	II
Church Minshull Bridge; 53.14193°N 2.49842°W		Late 18th century	The bridge carries Cross Lane over the River Weaver. It is built in sandstone, and has two arches with cutwaters. The parapet is solid, and there are five piers.	II
Beech House; 53.14020°N 2.50205°W		Early 19th century	A brick house with a slate roof. It is in two storeys and has a three-bay front. It has a single-bay rear wing, giving the house an L-shaped plan. To the right of the central doorway is a single-storey hexagonal bay window. The other windows are casements under brick arches.	II
Aqueduct; 53.12673°N 2.50260°W	—	1827–32	The aqueduct carries the Middlewich Branch of the Shropshire Union Canal over the River Weaver. It was designed by Thomas Telford, and is built in brick with stone dressings. The aqueduct consists of a large semicircular arch flanked by smaller arches for flood relief. By the sides of the arches are piers with round-headed niches. The curving wing walls end in newels.	II
Nanney's Bridge; 53.12285°N 2.51363°W	—	1827–33	The bridge carries the B5074 road over the Middlewich Branch of the Shropshire Union Canal. It was designed by Thomas Telford, and is built in brick with stone dressings. The bridge has a single basket arch, with solid parapets and piers.	II
The Wharf; 53.14280°N 2.49328°W		c. 1830	Originating as a canal warehouse and cottage, it has been converted into a house. It is built in brick with a slate roof. The house is in two storeys and has a three-bay front. The central bay projects forward and has a large carriage way arch, with a French window to the right. There are large gables over the central bay and at the east end, and smaller gables over the other bays; all the gables are shaped. The windows are casements.	II
