= St Bartholomew's Church, Church Minshull =

Coordinates: 53.1415°N 2.5005°W

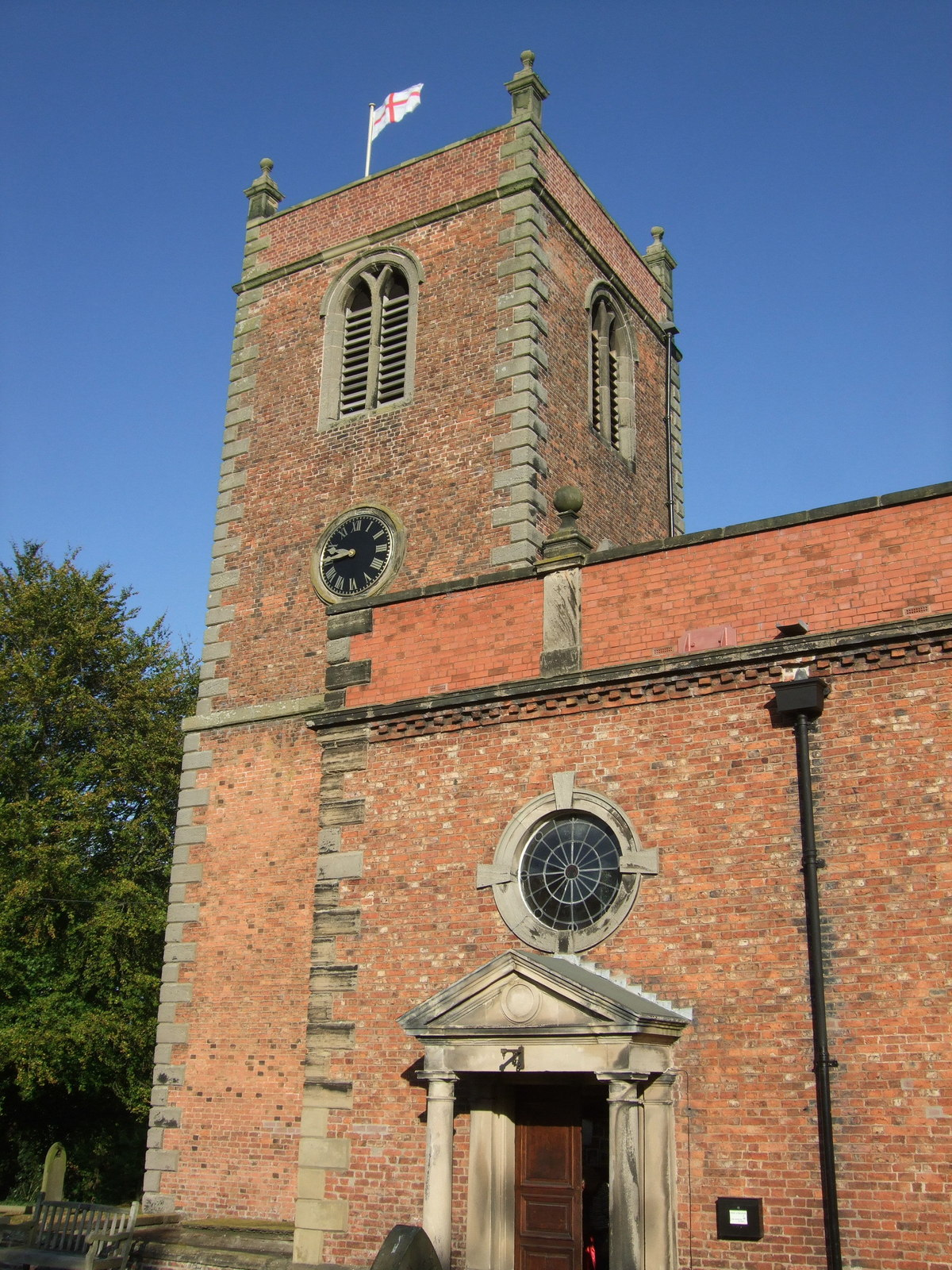
- Tower and west end of St Bartholomew's Church, Church Minshull

- Location in Cheshire
- OS grid reference: SJ 666 606
- Location: Church Minshull, Cheshire
- Country: England
- Denomination: Anglican
- Website: St Bartholomew, Church Minshull

History
- Status: Parish church
- Dedication: Saint Bartholomew

Architecture
- Functional status: Active
- Heritage designation: Grade II*
- Designated: 12 January 1967
- Architect: Walter Boden
- Architectural type: Church
- Style: Neoclassical

Specifications
- Materials: Brick with stone dressings Slate roof

Administration
- Province: York
- Diocese: Chester
- Archdeaconry: Macclesfield
- Deanery: Nantwich
- Parish: Church Minshull

Clergy
- Vicar: Rev. Anne Lawson

St Bartholomew's Church is in the village of Church Minshull, Cheshire, England. It is recorded in the National Heritage List for England as a designated Grade II* listed building. It is an active Anglican parish church in the diocese of Chester, the archdeaconry of Macclesfield, and the deanery of Nantwich. Its benefice is combined with those of St Mary, Acton, St David, Wettenhall, and St Oswald, Worleston.

== History ==
It is possible that a Saxon church was originally on the site. This was replaced in 1541 by a timber framed church which in 1572 contained at least 50 coats of arms of the local nobility, either depicted in the stained glass or painted on the walls. In 1667 a storm damaged the roof and the west wall. At the beginning of the following century the tower partially collapsed and it was rebuilt in 1702. The rest of the church was still in a dangerous condition and it was rebuilt in 1720. A clock was added to the tower in 1722. There were fires in the church in 1798 and 1804 which led to a restoration in 1861. Further fires occurred in 1874 and 1885. In 1891 there was another restoration of the church, by Walter Boden. The previous internal alterations had weakened the structure of the church and in 2000 it was declared to be unsafe. A major restoration of the roof took place in 2002. During 2007 the tower roof was restored and the parapet rebuilt. A kitchen, new boiler house and refurbished toilets were added in 2012.

== Architecture ==
=== Exterior ===
The church is constructed of brick with stone dressings. It is believed that the stone pillars inside the church are from the previous building. The exterior walls are of locally made brick, and the quoins and finials were made of stone from a quarry at Manley near Macclesfield. The plan of the church consists of a three-bay nave with a choir. At the east end is a shallow apse. The tower, in neoclassical style, is at the west end. The date 1702 is picked out in glazed bricks on the tower, either side of the clock face. On its west face are two round headed windows, one above the other. On the south face is a clock which is balanced by stained glass bull's eye windows in the other faces. Above these are louvred two-light belfry windows. At the top of the tower is an ogee cornice and a parapet with ball-topped finials at the corners. Over the north and south doors are bull's eye windows. The nave and chancel windows are round headed. Above these is a cornice and a solid red brick parapet, interrupted by ball-topped pilasters over each window on the south side. Externally on the east wall is a 17th-century slate armorial memorial.

=== Interior ===
At the west end of the church is a gallery, probably dating from 1861, and in the body of the church are box pews. There are memorials to the Brooke family on the north wall and in the south east corner a panel containing the arms of the Cholmondeley family painted by Randle Holme. On the east wall of the north aisle is a tablet containing details of the members of the Cholmondeley family who were buried in a vault. At the foot of the tower is the vault of the Wade family from Wades Green. The font, dated 1717, is in classical style and painted cream. It is by John Morfitt. In the apse on each side of the east window are panels containing the Ten Commandments and prayers. Also in the church are monuments dedicated to past incumbents. The marble war memorials date from after each of the two World Wars. There is a ring of six bells. Four of these are by Rudhall of Gloucester, three being dated 1717 and the fourth 1768. A cracked bell, also of 1717, is preserved inside the church. The other two bells, dated 1982 and 1983, are by Petit & Fritsen. The parish registers date from 1561 and churchwardens' accounts from 1623.

== External features ==
The gates and gate piers are listed at Grade II. They consist of cast iron gates hung on sandstone piers. The churchyard contains the war grave of a marine of World War I.

== See also ==
- Grade II* listed buildings in Cheshire East
- Listed buildings in Church Minshull
