= St Mary's Church, Acton =

Coordinates: 53.0737°N 2.5512°W

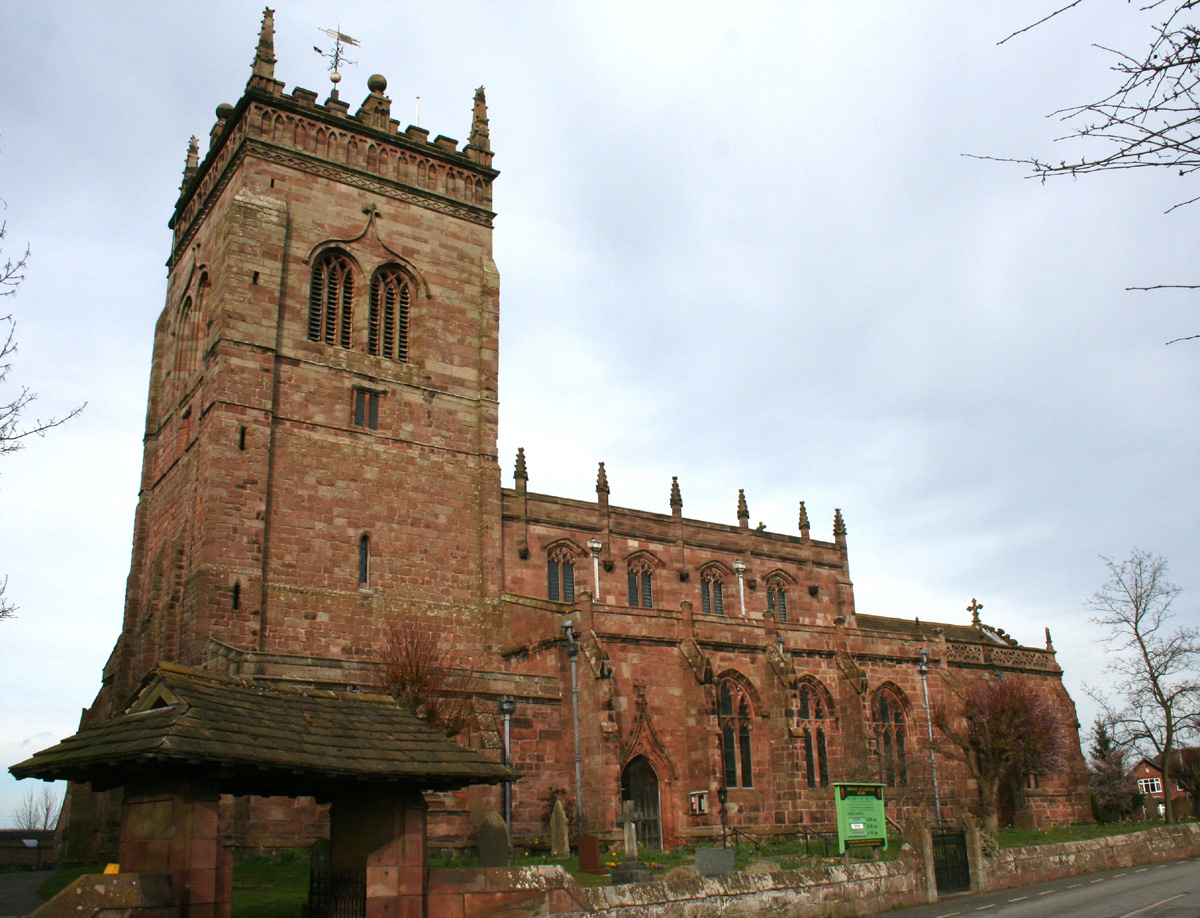
- St Mary's Church, Acton, from the southwest

- Location in Cheshire
- OS grid reference: SJ 631,531
- Location: Monk's Lane Acton, Cheshire
- Country: England
- Denomination: Anglican
- Website: St Mary, Acton

History
- Status: Parish church
- Dedication: St Mary

Architecture
- Functional status: Active
- Heritage designation: Grade I
- Designated: 12 January 1967
- Architect: Austin and Paley (restoration)
- Architectural type: Church
- Style: Gothic, Gothic Revival
- Completed: 1898

Specifications
- Materials: Red sandstone, lead roof

Administration
- Province: York
- Diocese: Chester
- Archdeaconry: Macclesfield
- Deanery: Nantwich

Clergy
- Vicar: Revd Ann Lawson

St Mary's Church is an active Anglican parish church located in Monk's Lane, Acton, a village to the west of Nantwich, Cheshire, England. Since 1967 it has been designated a Grade I listed building. A church has been present on this site since before the time of the Domesday Survey. The tower is the oldest in Cheshire, although it had to be largely rebuilt after it fell in 1757. One unusual feature of the interior of the church is that the old stone seating around its sides has been retained. In the south aisle are some ancient carved stones dating back to the Norman era. The architectural historian Alec Clifton-Taylor includes the church in his list of 'best' English parish churches. In the churchyard is a tall 17th-century sundial. The church is an active Anglican parish church in the diocese of Chester, the archdeaconry of Macclesfield and the deanery of Nantwich. Its benefice is united with those of St David, Wettenhall, St Oswald, Worleston, and St Bartholomew, Church Minshull.

== History ==
The presence of a church with two priests on the site is recorded in the Domesday Book. The church and its lands were given by the second Baron of Wich Malbank to Combermere Abbey early in the 12th century. Following the dissolution of the monasteries, the advowson was granted to Richard Wilbraham and it then passed to the Lords Tollemache.

The tower was built about 1180, which makes it the oldest tower in Cheshire. When it was built it was over 100 feet (30 m) high but its top collapsed in a storm in March 1757 damaging the roof of the church and the clerestory. It was rebuilt but only to a height of 80 feet (24 m). The north aisle was built in the last quarter of the 14th century in Decorated style and the south aisle and chancel were built early in the 15th century. The internal fittings of the church were damaged in the English Civil War. There were restorations in the 17th and 18th centuries. In 1897–98 the Lancaster architects Austin and Paley carried out a further restoration. This included reflooring and reroofing the church, removing the plaster ceilings, rebuilding the north wall of the north aisle and the clerestory, installing heating apparatus, and adding a new pulpit, porches, and doors.

== Architecture ==
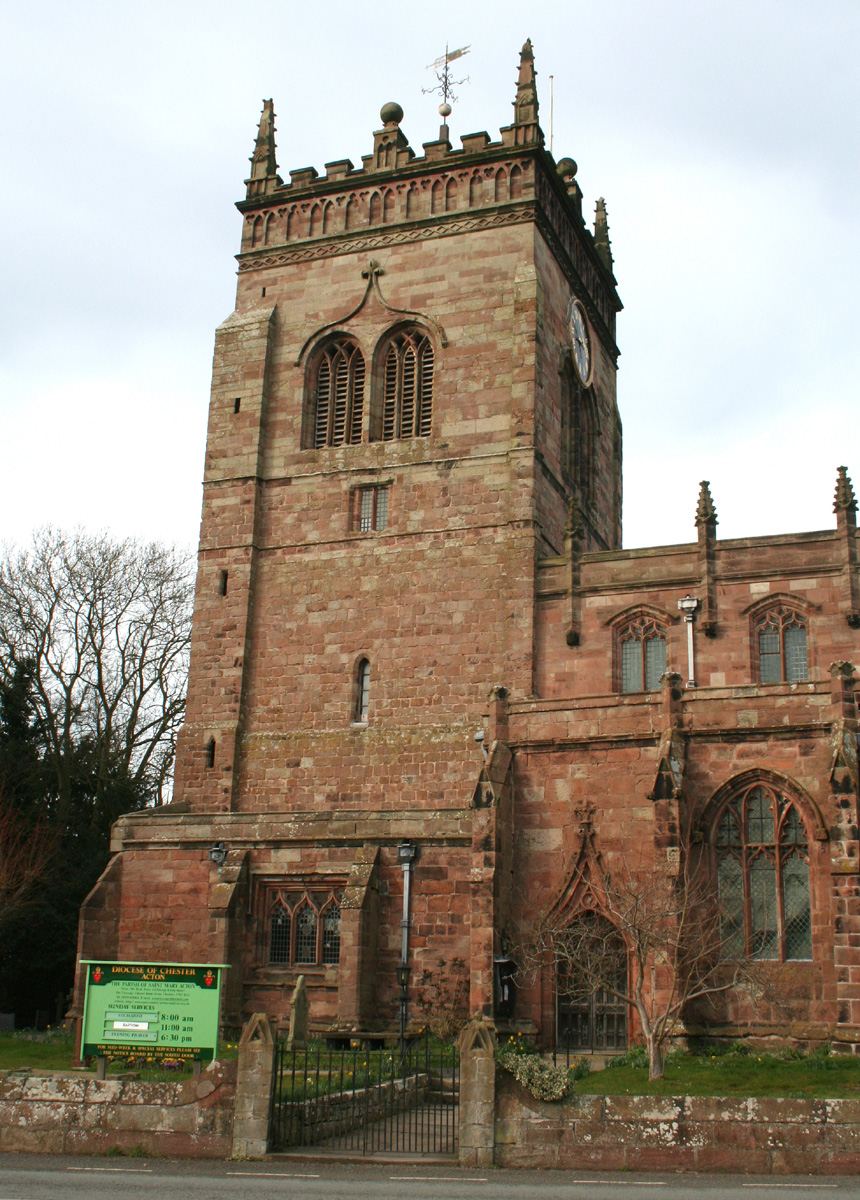
St Mary's tower

=== Exterior ===
The church is built in red sandstone with a lead roof. The tower is within the body of the church with arches leading into the nave and the side aisles. These arches, together with the thin lancet windows and the flat buttresses, date from the 13th century. The authors of the Buildings of England series state that this early date is rare for towers in Cheshire. The upper parts of the tower, built after the collapse of 1757, are by William Baker in early Gothic Revival style. The nave has four bays, with north and south aisles of six bays. The chancel has three bays with a vestry on its north side. The piers of the arcade date from the 13th century while the capitals are from the 19th-century restoration. The authors of the Buildings of England series state that the body of the church is mostly Perpendicular in style. At the east end of the north aisle is the Mainwaring chapel, which was originally a Lady Chapel; at the north side of the tower is the Dorfold chantry. Old stone seating remains around the sides of the church, which is unusual.

=== Fittings and furniture ===
In the Mainwaring chapel is the canopied wall tomb of Sir William Mainwaring of Baddiley and Peover who died in 1399. His effigy is in alabaster, it is recumbent and dressed in plate armour as a knight. His head rests on a helm bearing an ass's head and around his neck is a gold collar of esses. The rest of the monument is in red sandstone. At the east end of the south aisle is a marble tomb commemorating Sir Richard Wilbraham (1578–1643), his son Sir Thomas Wilbraham (1601–1660) and their wives. It includes the recumbent effigies in marble of Sir Thomas and his wife, Elizabeth. At the east end of the south aisle is an ancient piscina which is in good condition. In the chancel is another piscina and a sedilia, both of which are damaged. The screen in the Dorfold chapel is dated 1685 while that dividing the chancel from the nave is from a later date. The communion rail is also dated 1685. The brass chandelier dates from the 18th century. Stained glass in the east window and in windows of the south aisle is by Kempe and is dated between 1885 and 1888. The reredos includes the Ten Commandments to the north of the altar and the Lord's Prayer and the Creed to the south. The carved oak pulpion a stone base and the oak eagle lectern date from the 19th century.

The font has a Norman bowl with lead lining set on a 19th-century base. It consists of a round bowl carved with figures, and simple ornamentation. For many years it had been in the garden of nearby Dorfold Hall before being reinstated in the church. At the east end of the south aisle are carved stones, some in sandstone, others in limestone. The style of the limestone stones suggests a date at the end of the 11th century and that of the sandstone stones around 1100. They are considered to be among the most significant pieces of Romanesque sculpture in the country. There is a ring of six bells. Five of these were cast by Rudhall of Gloucester in the 18th century and the sixth by John Taylor & Co in 1893. The parish registers begin in 1653 and the churchwardens' accounts in 1755. The two-manual organ was made by Alex Young and Sons of Manchester in 1897, and was renovated in 1939, and again in 1997.

== External features ==
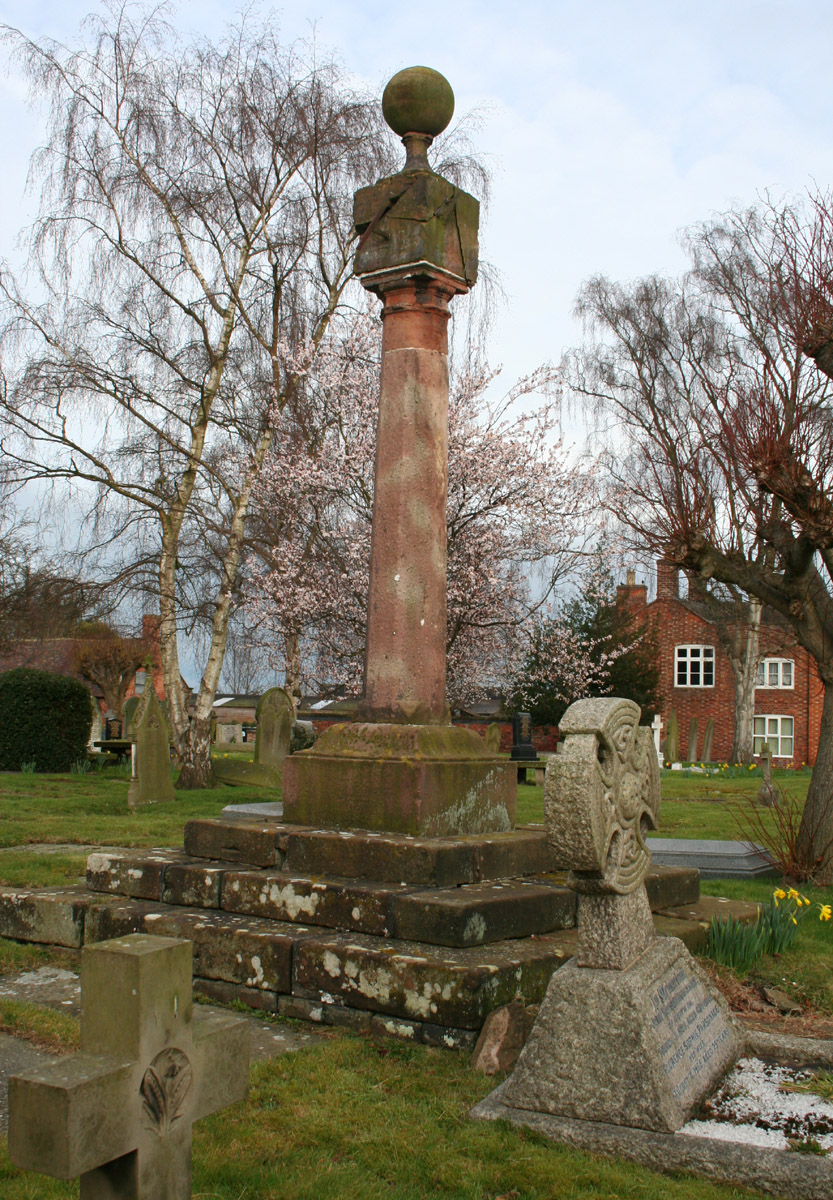
Sundial

In the churchyard is a tall sandstone sundial over 12 feet (4 m) high. It was originally a medieval cross which was made into a sundial in the late 17th century. The remaining parts of the cross consist of an octagonal shaft on three ashlar steps. On top of this has been added a square moulded cap surmounted by a ball finial. On each face of the head is a dial, and the head is surmounted by a globe on a short stem. It is a scheduled monument and is designated as a Grade II listed building. Also listed Grade II is the red sandstone churchyard boundary wall which is probably an 1897 restoration of an earlier wall.

To the north of the church is a pair of Grade-II-listed former almshouses dating from the early 17th century.

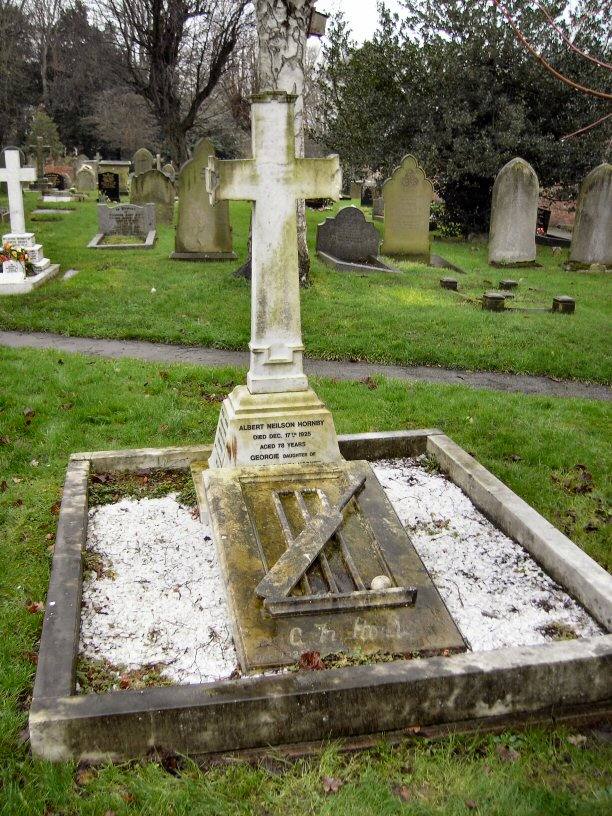
Tombstone of A.N. Hornby

A. N. Hornby (1847–1925), who played cricket for Lancashire and England, is buried here. He was the first man (of only two) to captain his country in both cricket and rugby, but is also remembered as the England cricket captain whose side lost the Test match which gave rise to The Ashes, at home against the Australians in 1882. Additionally, he played football for Blackburn Rovers. He was immortalised in one of the best known of all cricket poems, At Lord's by Francis Thompson, which contains the following lines:

It is little I repair to the matches of the Southron folk,

Though my own red roses there may blow;
It is little I repair to the matches of the Southron folk,
Though the red roses crest the caps, I know.
For the field is full of shades as I near a shadowy coast,
And a ghostly batsman plays to the bowling of a ghost,
And I look through my tears on a soundless-clapping host
As the run stealers flicker to and fro,
To and fro:

O my Hornby and my Barlow long ago!

The churchyard contains the war graves of five Commonwealth service personnel; two of World War I and three of World War II. Crimean War Victoria Cross recipient, Surgeon Major Thomas Egerton Hale (1832-1909) is also buried in Acton parish churchyard.

== Current activities ==
St Mary's continues to be active as an Anglican parish church. It is the most active member of the Cross Country Group of Parish Churches which comprises St Mary's, St Bartholomew's, Church Minshull, St Oswald's, Worleston and St David's, Wettenhall. The churches share a vicar and three licensed readers. The vicar is the Rev Anne Lawson. St Mary's holds two or three services each Sunday and a service of Holy Communion each Wednesday. The group of churches is also involved with community activities including Praise & Play for pre-school children and their carers, the Holy Disorder youth club and the 1st Darnhall Guides and Brownies. The church is open for visits and private prayers on Wednesday mornings.

== See also ==
- Grade I listed churches in Cheshire
- List of scheduled monuments in Cheshire (1066–1539)
- Listed buildings in Acton, Cheshire
- List of Norman architecture in Cheshire
- List of ecclesiastical works by Austin and Paley (1895–1916)
